= Xinchejian =

Xinchejian 新车间
- Formation: 2010
- Type: Hackerspace
- Purpose: Hacking
- Location: Shanghai, China
- Coordinates: 31°13′35″N 121°26′55″E
- Official language: English, Chinese
- Founders: David Li, Ricky Ng-Adam, Min Lin Hsieh, volunteers
- Affiliations: Xinfab, Noisebridge, Gold Coast Techspace
- Staff: 10
- Website: www.xinchejian.com

Xinchejian (Mandarin: 新车间; pinyin: xīn chē jiān) is the first hackerspace in China. It was founded in 2010 by David Li, Ricky Ng-Adam, and Min Lin Hsieh in Shanghai, inspired by hackerspaces in the West and the Shanzhai culture of China. Xinchejian is registered as a company, but is run as a non-profit organization, and managed by volunteers.

== Mission ==
According to Xinchejian's about page, "Xīnchējiān is a non-profit organization, its mission is to support, create and promote physical computing, open source hardware and Internet of Things... Our long-term goal is to spread the concept and philosophy across China and inspire Hackerspaces in every large city from east to west."

Xinjechian has been noted as China's first hackerspace, and as a place for innovation and collaboration, in a country also known for its strong internet censorship.

== Membership ==
Xinchejian encourages people to become a member and contribute to the maker community in Shanghai. Non-members are welcome on Wednesday nights at the open night talks, and are encouraged to participate in workshops. Workshops for learning skills, such as Arduino, and simple projects often have a cost to cover the instructor and materials. Membership costs 100 RMB per month (~16 USD).

Xinchejian is loosely managed by its unpaid volunteer staff members.

== Projects ==
Xinchejian members have been involved numerous hobby, commercial, and artistic projects.

A Xinchejian team won second place in the roaming category in a $10 USD Robot Design Challenge from the African Robotics Network.

== Community Participation ==
Xinchejian members are involved in numerous events, including regional maker events such as Maker Faire in Shenzhen and the Maker Carnival in Shanghai. Xinchejian hopes to contribute to the founding of hackerspaces throughout China.

== Media Coverage ==
Xinchejian has been covered by international media for a myriad of projects involving their membership.

- The Wall Street Journal: In China, Lessons of a 'Hackerspace'
- Hurst, Nathan (September 29, 2012). "These $10 Robots Will Change Robotics Education". Wired.
- Bloomberg: China's Maker Movement Gets Government Support for DIY Workshops
- Hackday: Intro to Xinchejian in Shanghai

== Physical Space ==
In December 2020, Xinchejian moved into a larger space at Huide Mansion, in Huangpu district of Shanghai. The current space has a machine shop, areas for 3D printing, Laser cutting, electronics, and desks for laptop work and socializing. Xinchejian has had a physical location since 2011.

In 2014, Xinchejian moved into the People Squared Co-working space at 28 Yuyuan East Road, in Jing'an District of Shanghai. This space had a machine shop, areas for 3D printing, Laser cutting, electronics, and desks for laptop work and socializing.

== See also ==
- Maker culture
- Hackerspace
- Open source hardware
- Open design
