= Gold Coast Techspace =

- Formation: 2011
- Type: Hackerspace
- Purpose: Hacking
- Location: Gold Coast, Australia
- Coordinates: 28°04′48″S 153°21′47″E
- Official language: English
- Founders: Steve Dalton, Lucas Brandt, Nick Byrne
- Affiliations: Xinchejian, ReadWrite Labs
- Staff: 9
- Website: gctechspace.org

The Gold Coast Techspace is a Hackerspace and Makerspace focusing on electronics, computer programming, and 3D printing. It is currently located at the Mudgeeraba Old Post Office, Mudgeeraba, Gold Coast, Queensland, Australia.

Gold Coast Techspace is a central component of the Gold Coast startup ecosystem and has a sister relationship with Xinchejian, a Hackerspace in Shanghai, China.

== History ==
The space was started by a group of local technologists, Lucas Brandt, Steven Dalton & Nick Byrne in 2011. Shortly after acquiring their first location in Johnston St, Southport, Gold Coast Techspace (GCTS), was incorporated as a Queensland Incorporated Association (Non-profit) and has operated this way since.

For a while the Gold Coast TechSpace also ran the first coworking space on the Gold Coast – Gold Coast Co-working. As more coworking spaces emerged on the Gold Coast, the GCTS Co-Working space was closed to allow the space to focus on its core activities.

Over the years GCTS has held or participated in a number of collaborative events to encourage development in technology in the local area, these include the Gold Coast Science Fair 2013 and numerous BarCamps; open, participatory meetup.com stylised workshop events designed to provide a representative stage for potential technology ideas, demonstrations &/or start-ups .

== Activities ==
Gold Coast TechSpace is the instigator of a number of technology related activities on the Gold Coast including:

- The first gateway location for the Gold Coast's public access LPWAN using The Things Network
- Barcamp Gold Coast

== See also ==
- Maker culture
- Hackerspace
- Open source hardware
- Robotics
- Internet of Things
- LPWAN
