= Tulley =

Tulley is a surname. Notable people with the surname include:

- Daniel Tulley, American military officer
- Edwin Tulley Newton (1840–1930), British politician
- Gever Tulley, American writer
- Joe Tulley (1922–2003), American politician
- Paul Tulley (born 1942), American actor
