= RaumZeitLabor =

Hackspace in Mannheim, Germany

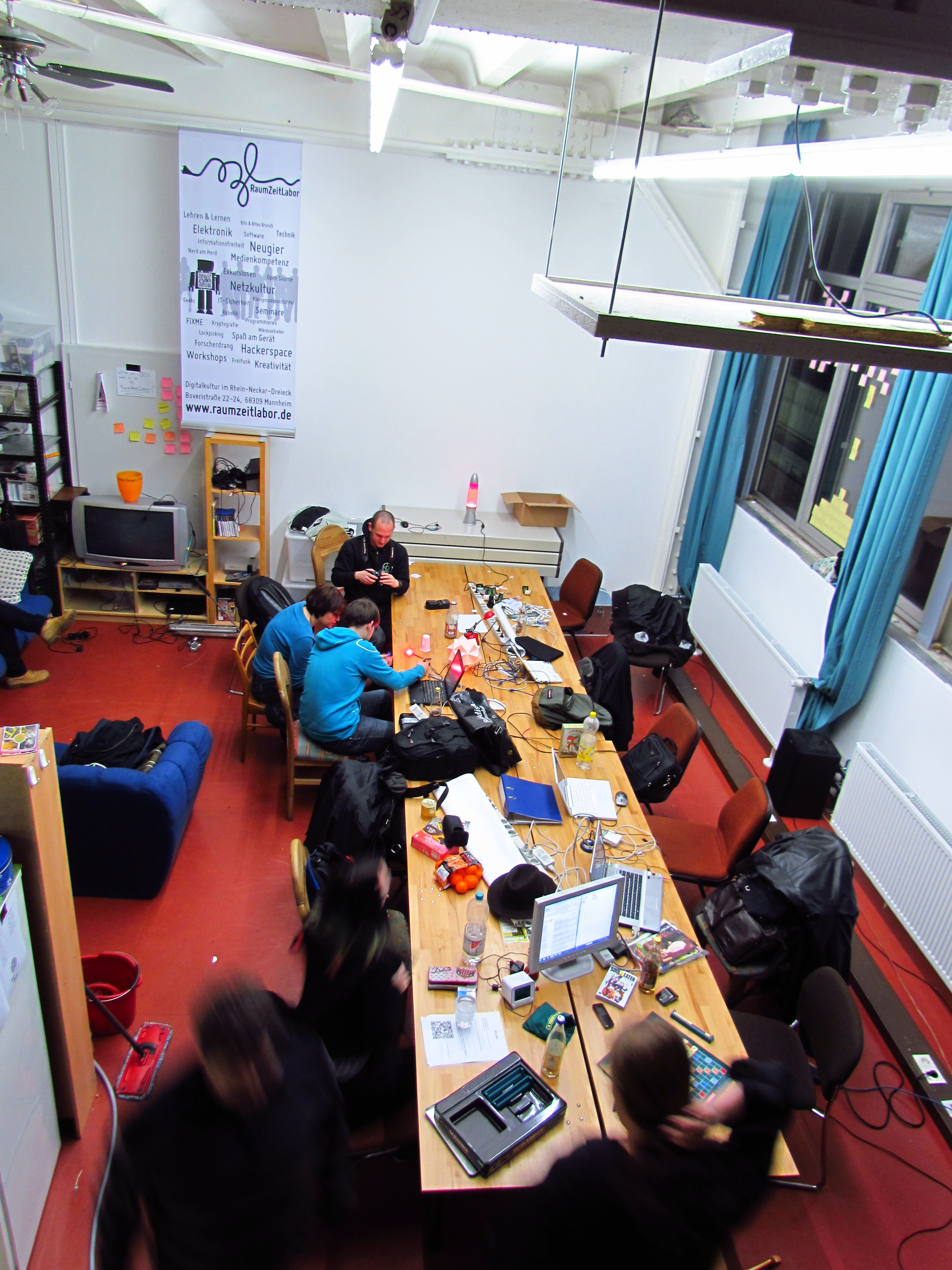
- The German hackerspace RaumZeitLabor
- Type: NGO
- Legal status: eingetragener Verein
- Purpose: Hacking
- Location: Mannheim-Käfertal
- Coordinates: 49.507242°N 8.499177°E
- Region served: Germany
- Services: Hackerspace
- Members: 128
- Official language: German
- Website: raumzeitlabor.de

RaumZeitLabor is a hackerspace operated by non-profit association RaumZeitLabor e. V. in the city of Mannheim, Germany.

== The association ==
RaumZeitLabor is operated by non-profit association RaumZeitLabor e. V. and is mainly financed by about 100 members and donations. Membership is not required to take part in the, for the most part, free workshops and meetings.

The purpose of the association is the creation of an environment for youth work, adult education, modern information privacy and socializing between communities.

== The hackerspace ==
RaumZeitLabor is located in the former building of Standard Elektrik Lorenz in Mannheim-Käfertal.

The hackerspace itself consists of four rooms (in total around 200m^{2}). Part of the rooms are a kitchen, areas for electronics, 3D printing, Embroidery as well as a workshop for woodworking.

== Equipment ==
RaumZeitLabor contains different kinds of equipment to help members fulfil their projects and services being offered.

Part of the equipment, amongst other things:

- a laser (40 watt carbon dioxide)
- several oscilloscopes
- Multiple 3D printer (Material extrusion and stereolithograyph)
- equipment for soldering
- storage for electronics parts
- a transfer press
- computer-operated sewing machine

== Nationwide awareness ==
RaumZeitLabor is known in the European hackerspace culture for participating in several events and initiating the Large Hackerspace Convention (LHC), a networking conference for many hackerspaces.

The hackerspace is also known for its transparency concerning information and everyday life. In the founding phase the creation of an internal-only mailing list was denied. Via the software Info screen the hackerspace publishes several information concerning the association, for example the bank balance. According to this approach, non-members are always welcome.

RaumZeitLabor organizes the international Trollcon, a conference about the social phenomenon of trolling. Trollcon 2012 had about 100 attendees, also members of the press. Amongst the speakers were for example lawyer Udo Vetter and media artist Dragan Espenschied. As part of the event, member of Pirate Party Germany in the Abgeordnetenhaus of Berlin, Christopher Lauer, received the prize "Troll of the Year".

The association organizes and publishes speeches weekly, for example about particle accelerator LHC at CERN.

Because members of the hackerspace are actively participating in hacker events like Chaos Communication Congress, SIGINT or FrOsCon, the RaumZeitLabor meanwhile has an outstanding perception in the German and European hacker subculture. Numerous press articles concerning the 29th Chaos Communication Congress are mentioning the RaumZeitLabor as representative of the German hacker subculture.
