= NYC Resistor =

Hackerspace in New York

- Formation: 2008
- Purpose: Hacking
- Location: United States
- Coordinates: 40.6836204°N 73.9816925°W
- Region served: NYC
- Members: 50-60 members
- Origin: New York
- Founders: Bre Pettis, George Shammas, Zach Smith, Eric Skiff, Nick Bilton, Dave Clausen, Raphael Abrams, Diana Eng, Pat Gallagher
- Affiliations: Metalab, Chaos Computer Club, Noisebridge and similar
- Staff: 0
- Website: www.nycresistor.com

NYC Resistor is a restricted membership private club hackerspace with approximately 50 members in New York, inspired by Chaos Computer Club and other hacker organizations. The New York Times describes it as "kind of frat house for modern-day mad scientists." Its own website describes itself as "NYC Resistor is a hacker collective with a shared space located in downtown Brooklyn. We meet regularly to share knowledge, hack on projects together, and build community."

== Notable Projects ==
- NYC Resistor was a finalist in Red Bull Creation 2011, submitting Nautilus Terrestrial, "a hand-pumped railroad cart slapped on top of a bicycle."
