= Mudgeeraba Old Post Office =

Heritage listed building in Queensland, Australia

Coordinates: 28.0786°S 153.3647°E

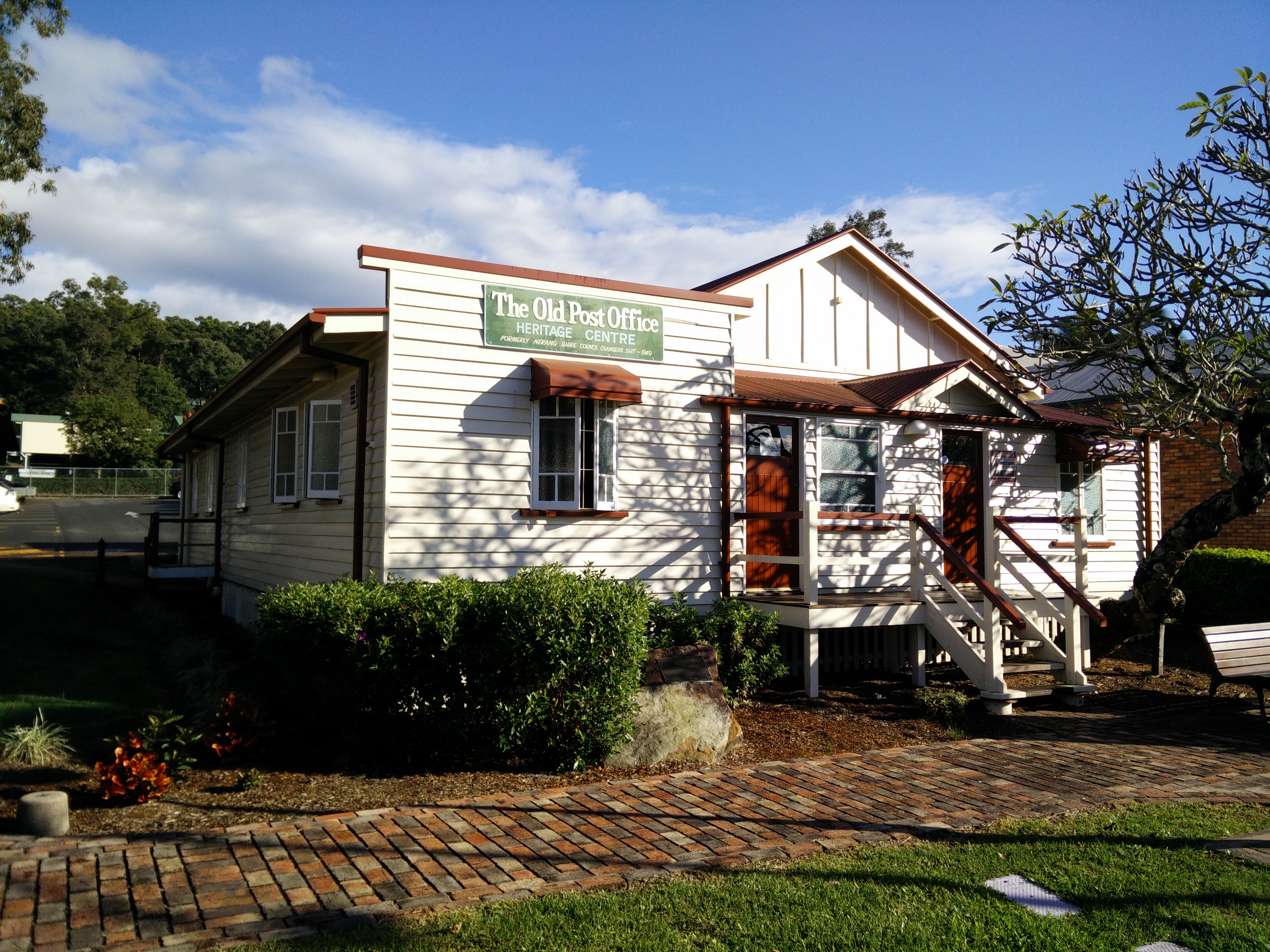
Mudgeeraba Old Post Office

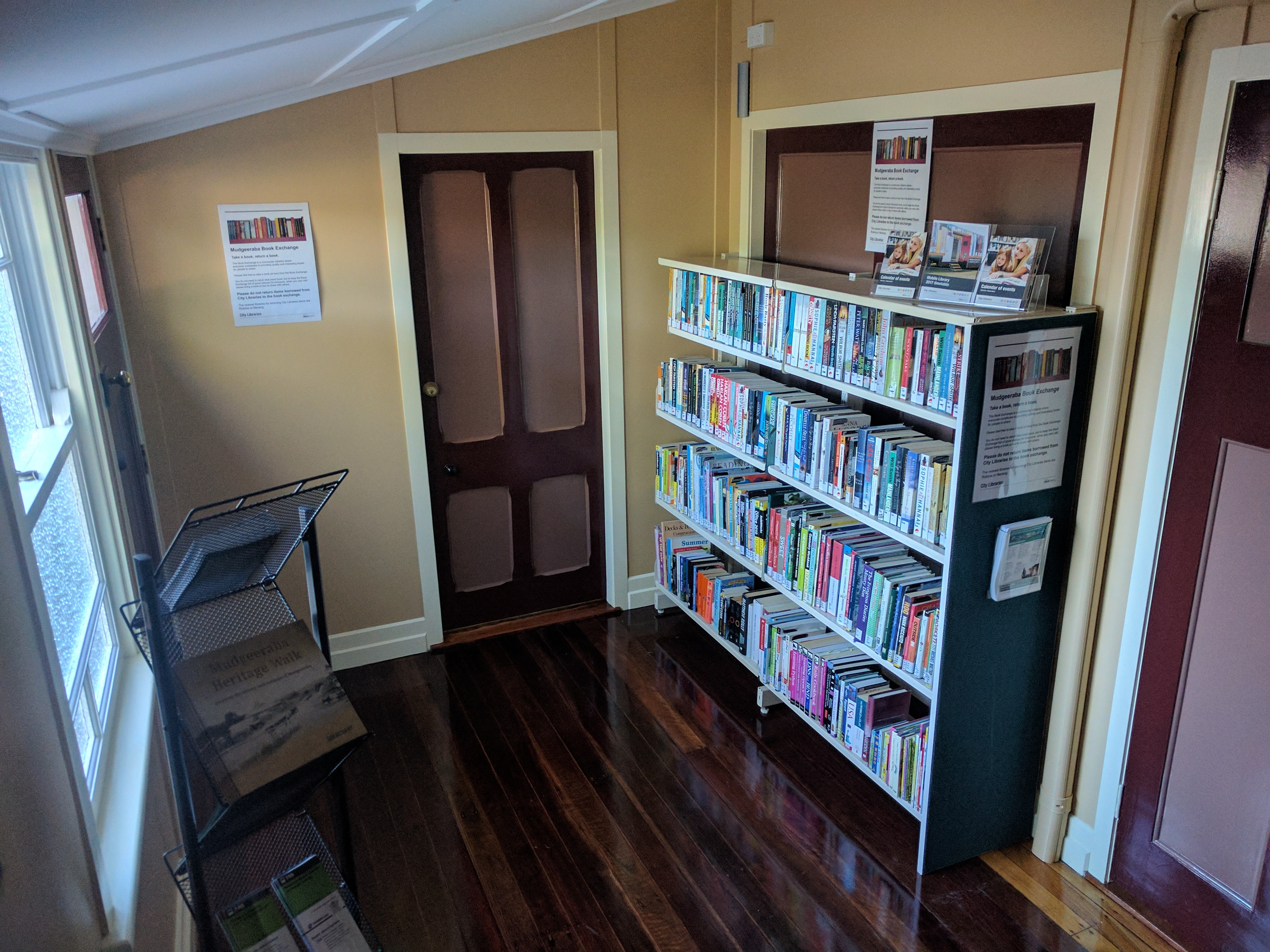
Mudgeeraba Book Exchange

The Mudgeeraba Old Post Office is a former post office at 57 Railway Street, Mudgeeraba in the City of Gold Coast, Queensland, Australia. It is listed on the Gold Coast Local Heritage Register.

== History ==
The building was erected in 1927 as the council chambers for the Shire of Nerang and was used for that purpose until 1949, when the Shire was amalgamated into the Shire of Albert.

== Recent history ==
- 2015 – Visitor Centre moved materials moved to Mudgeeraba Markets
- 2016 – Announced that the library in its current form would close in Jan 2017 to be replaced by digital library activities, book exchange, community hire and expanded Gold Coast Techspace activities
- 2017 – Building undergoes renovation in line with council heritage plan. Library books removed from building to be replaced by City Libraries STEAM program and a public book exchange.
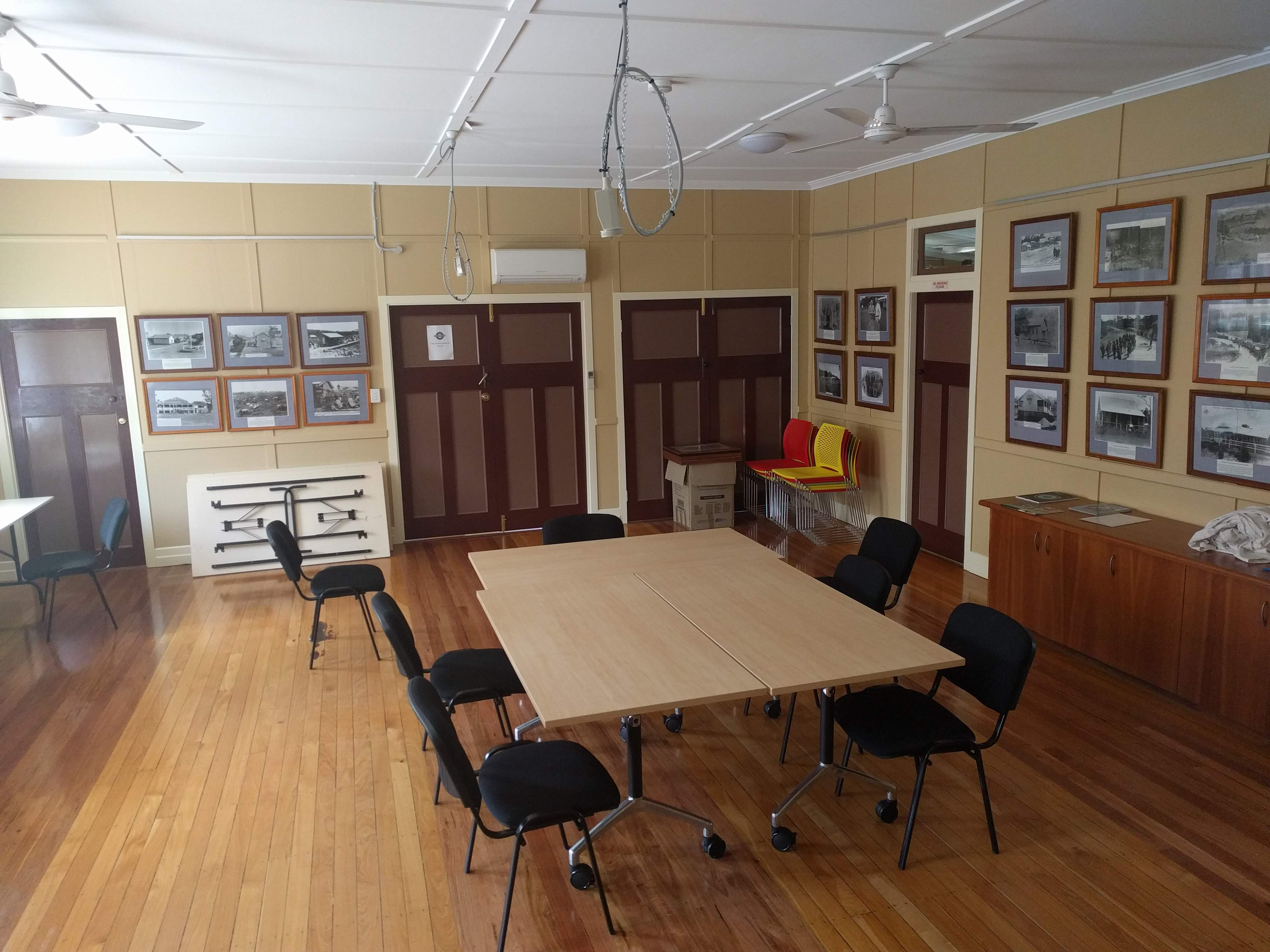
- Activity Space
  2018 – Main activity space changed to be available for hire by community.

== Current Usage ==
The building currently contains a number of facilities managed by the Gold Coast City Council:

- Mudgeeraba Book Exchange – at front entry to the building
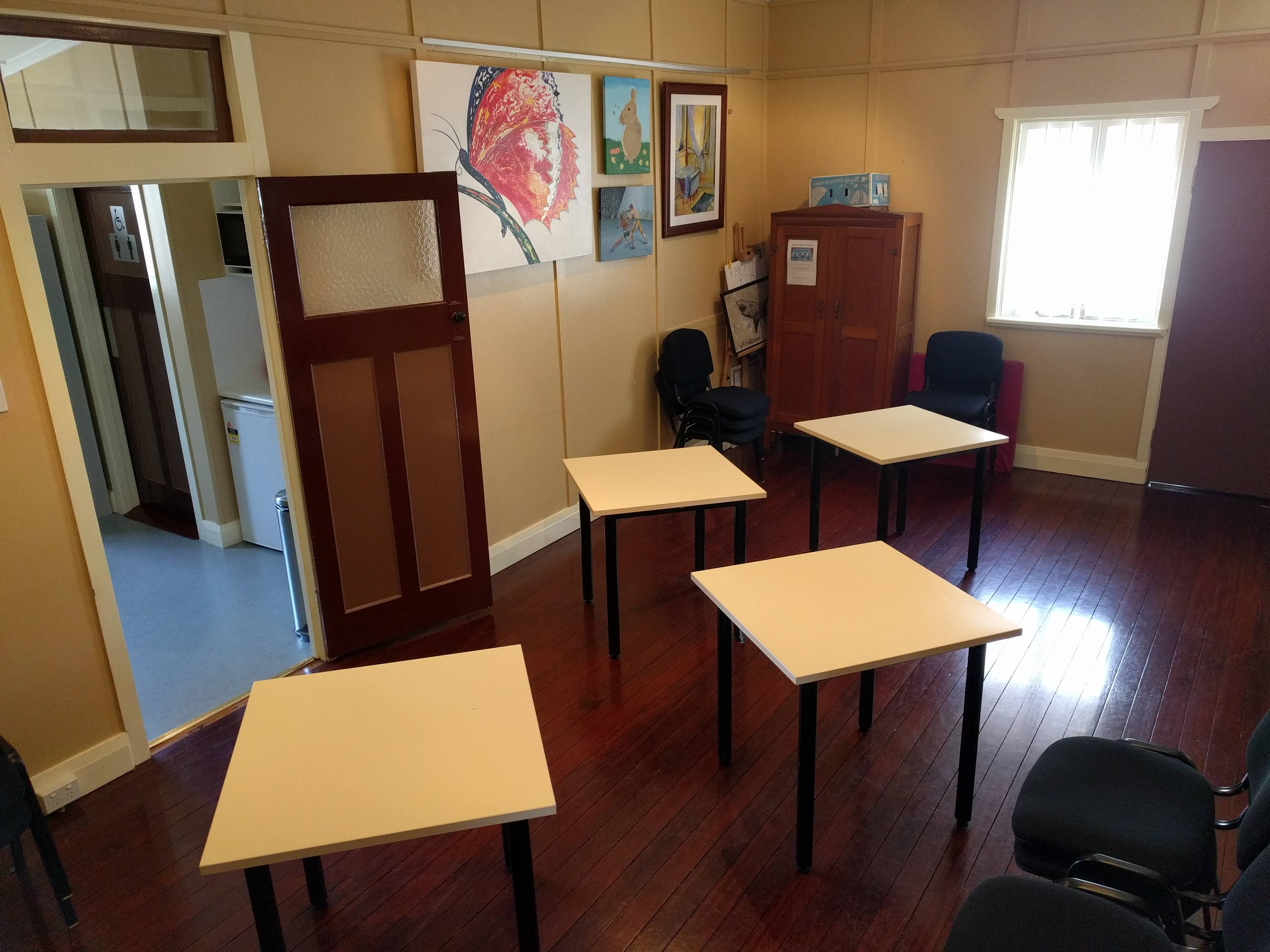
- Community Room
  Gold Coast Techspace – Makerspace and Education Centre
- Community Centre – meeting room and activity space available for community hire
