= Metalab =

Hacklab in Vienna

Coordinates: 48°12′33.87634″N 16°21′22.23″E

- Formation: 2006
- Purpose: Hacking
- Location: Austria
- Origin: Vienna, Austria
- Founders: Paul Böhm, Philipp Tiefenbacher
- Affiliations: Chaos Computer Club, c-base, NYC Resistor, Noisebridge and similar
- Website: metalab.at

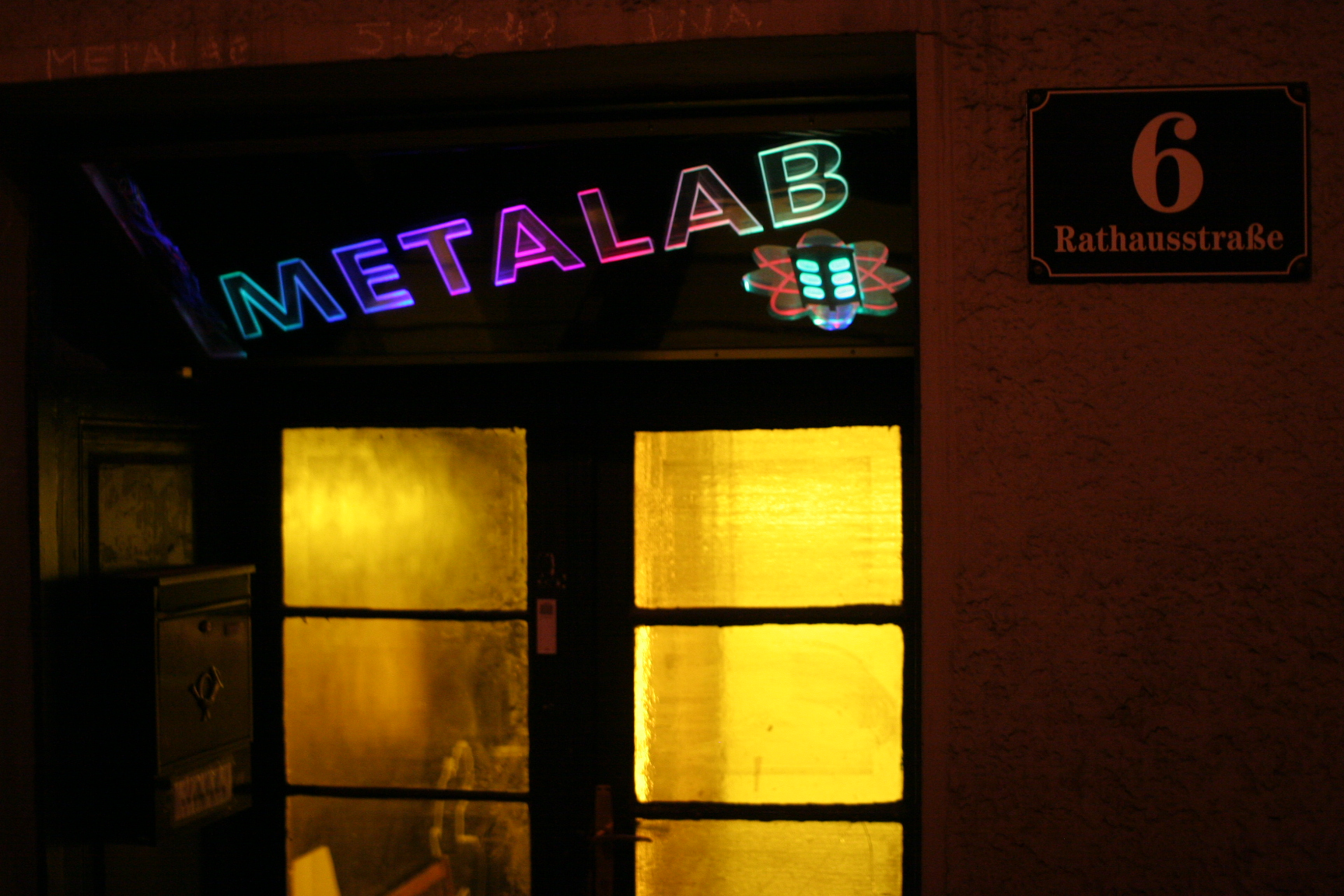
Metalab in Vienna, Austria.

The Metalab is a hackerspace in Vienna's central first district. Founded in 2006, it is a meeting place of the Viennese tech community, hosting events from cultural festivals to user groups. It has played a catalyst role in the global hackerspace movement and was the birthplace of several internet startup companies.

== Description ==
Metalab offers space for the free exchange of information, and collaboration between technical-creative enthusiasts, hackers, founders, and digital artists. Metalab provides infrastructure for projects and offers a physical space for interested people from the fields of IT, new media, digital art, net art and hacker culture.

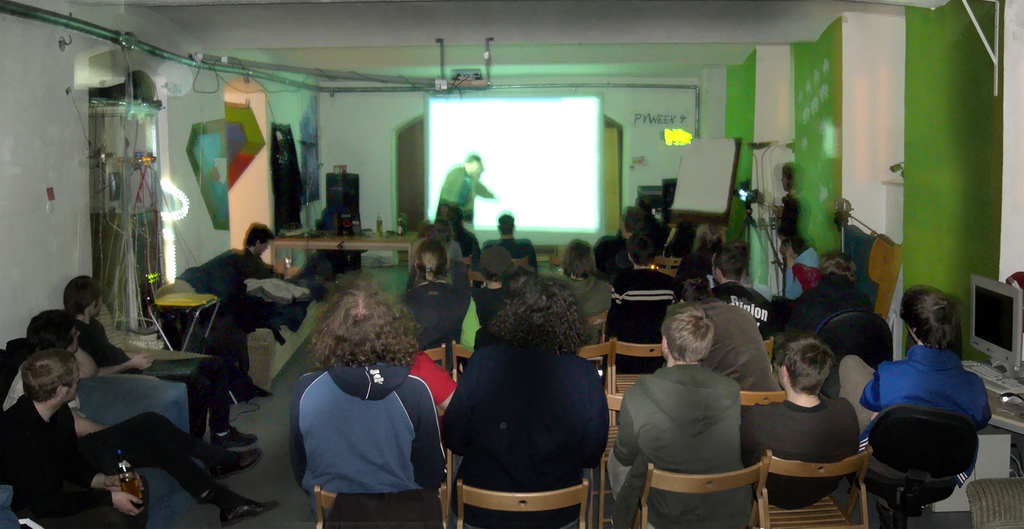
Open lecture held IY cultureat the Metalabs main hall

Besides a main room suited for working on laptops or having workshops and presentations, the space incorporates a library room, a lounge featuring a variety of game consoles as well as inbuilt Dance Dance Revolution pads, a workshop/hardware hacking area called 'Whateverlab', a room for heavy machinery, a photography lab or dark room (which also hosts a professional setup for etching PCBs), a kitchen, bathrooms, and a locker room. The whole hackerspace is a non-smoking area. Until 2015 the lounge acted as a designated smokers' room but this was changed. Next to self-built machines, furniture, and decorations (mostly featuring the use of LEDs), the infrastructure provided to all members as well as externs includes a lathe, a CNC machine, a CAD station, a laser cutter, a RepRap, two Makerbots, electronic measurement tools like oscilloscopes and pattern generators, soldering irons, and other tools needed for electronics development. The main room, library, and lounge are all equipped with a projector; several uplinks provide access to the Internet via Gigabit Ethernet or Wireless LAN.

The core/organization team (composed of volunteers) meets monthly to discuss matters relevant to the hackerspace, like current and future renovation projects and equipment purchases. There are multiple special interest groups, which meet more regularly and often spontaneously. The lab itself is open every day, usually for 24 hours. Every regular member can get a key.

== Influence ==
Metalab has been a source of multiple startups, open source and art projects including Mjam, currently, Austria's largest internet food delivery company, YEurope, which was Europe's first YCombinator inspired startup accelerator, the annual DeepSec Security Conference, Graffiti Research Lab Vienna, the 3D modeling software OpenSCAD and the beginnings of what was later developed into Makerbot at NYC Resistor. It has been a host of over 400 events, talks, and workshops. Metalab featured talks and workshops with various personalities from the tech and culture field. The members of Metalab initiated many digital culture and net art projects in Vienna. Since 2006, the Metalab has been hosting a part of Paraflows, an annual international festival for net cultures and code art.

== History ==
As one of the first intentionally created Hackerspaces outside of Germany, its creation required the development of financing models and organizational structures that are now used by hackerspaces throughout the world. Its creation was inspired by the Chaos Computer Club and the C-base in Berlin, and in turn marked the beginning of a Hackerspace Revolution that led to the creation of hundreds more Hackerspaces throughout the world.

Initially, two of Metalab's founders wanted to give Metalab the name KyBase (from Wiener Kybernetischer Kreis, their Hacker Group), but decided to go with Metalab instead to signal openness to any interest seriously pursued and that the new entity would be independent and an environment encompassing a plurality of interests, professions, and genders. Their logo depicts a phone booth – old school, public-access technology that has certain mythical qualities in fiction (examples include Dr. Who‘s TARDIS that serves as a gateway into other worlds, and Clark Kent turning into Superman in a phone booth). Metalab keeps an original Austrian Telephone Booth in its main room, which is also transported to wherever the group wants to signal presence at international conventions such as the Chaos Communication Camp in Germany.

In the beginning, the group focused on acquiring a physical space. While there had been several meetings in coffee houses, intentionally no social events had been organized before the rental contract was signed because the founding director Paul Böhm wanted to attract an initial group that was focused on getting things done instead of getting stuck in perpetual social meetings. Once the group managed to convince 40 people to sign a non-binding declaration of intent to pay membership dues, and a set of 4 sponsors had been found, the rental contract for the current location was signed. It is a core value of Metalab that operating expenses are always paid exclusively through a broad membership base (currently over 200 dues-paying members). Public funding and sponsoring, in part from the net culture funding budget of the City of Vienna ("Netznetz") and the Austrian Federal Government, have allowed for the expansion and improvement of the space, purchase of equipment, and realization of bigger projects.

== See also ==
- AXIOM (camera)
