= Tinkering School =

- California; United States

Information
- Motto: think, make, tinker
- Established: 2004

Tinkering School is an educational program created by Gever Tulley in California and is a registered trademark of Tinkering Unlimited.

== Format ==
One aspect of Tinkering School is a sleepover summer camp where children participate in projects based on exploration and experimentation. Making use of various materials, students are encouraged to develop projects through which they develop skills such as creativity, communication and working in groups. The children spend an entire week inventing solutions, working on projects, testing their creations, and also having fun.

A core aspect of the Tinkering School pedagogy is the idea of a "projectory". A simple mashup of the notions of “project” and “trajectory," a projectory is a project that leaves the child on a trajectory that extends the experience beyond the end of the project.

This is combined with the notion of “escape velocity”. The escape velocity of a project is a measure of the participant's engagement and the resistance that the project offers to further exploration after it is built. A perfect project is one that has very high engagement (which you can measure by how easily distracted they are during the project) and very low resistance to further exploration.

Several affiliate programs have focused their activities on day camps and weekend workshops, rather than sleepover summer camps. While the projects themselves may be smaller, the "projectories" are no less impactful.

== History ==
Computer scientist Gever Tulley founded Tinkering School in 2005.

== Collaborators ==
Collaborators are the adult participants in the projects. They provide support, guide the project, and collaborate with the children in the discovery of a solution.

== Curriculum ==
At Tinkering School there is no set curriculum. There are no tests or evaluations, and collaborators do not teach any particular subject. All learning is student-directed and project-based.

== See also ==
- Challenge-Based Learning
- Hackerspace
