= Netznetz =

netznetz was a social platform for individuals and groups associated with net art, digital art and net culture in Vienna, Austria. It became known for developing a participatory model for the distribution of municipal funding for Vienna's net culture and digital art scene.

In October 2004, netznetz.net organised a three-day festival and convention at the Künstlerhaus in Vienna. Under the motto "Bring yourself and your own devices", around 60 net culture initiatives from the "electronic greater Vienna area" presented projects and discussed practices, collaborations and future structures for digital culture.

netznetz.net subsequently proposed a new approach to the distribution of net culture funding to the City of Vienna. In 2005 the city announced a revised funding model for net culture, increasing the annual budget for the field from €300,000 to €500,000 beginning in 2006.

The paraflows festival for digital art and culture, first held in Vienna in 2006, was associated with the netznetz initiative and described in contemporary press coverage as its annual convention.

== Funding model ==
Netznetz, also referred to in connection with the software-supported Mana or MANA Community Game model, was a system for distributing municipal grants in which participants in the field allocated parts of the available funding according to democratically agreed rules. The system was developed with the open platform netznetz.net and operated with funding provided by the City of Vienna.

The central element of the model was the annually funded "Network Grants" programme, endowed with €250,000. According to the City of Vienna, the aim was to create a software-supported selection process without curators or juries, reflecting what the city described as the participatory and egalitarian character of net culture. The other funding modules were "Microgrants" for smaller and first-time projects, "Backbone Projects" for infrastructure, and an "Annual Convention" for presentation, discussion and international exchange.

The Mana system distributed not only symbolic points but actual public funding. In the model described by ORF, participants received a different number of game points from the software and had to allocate them to others; at the end of the process, accumulated points could be exchanged for grant money through the city administration.

The process was controversial. Supporters presented it as an open, democratic and non-bureaucratic alternative to conventional arts funding. Critics argued that a system in which potential grant recipients also evaluated each other created social pressure, conflicts of interest and incentives for strategic behaviour. The model was also discussed in relation to game theory and economic theories of collective decision-making.

A University of Vienna thesis later described Netznetz as a Viennese funding model for net art and net culture and analysed it in relation to Austrian cultural policy, governance and critiques of neoliberal outsourcing of governmental responsibility.

In 2008 the City of Vienna changed the model. Parts of the funding for digital art were moved to an internationally composed jury. The city stated that the original system had been organised by the loose community "Netznetz" and that its voting procedures were legally equivalent to jury recommendations.

The netznetz funding model was later discontinued.

== Coordinators ==
- January 2006-July 2006: Stefan Lutschinger
- July 2006-September 2006: Johannes Grenzfurthner
- September 2006-October 2006: Paul Böhm
- November 2006-September 2007: Andreas Trawöger
- September 2007-December 2007: Valie Göschl and Charlotte Zott
- December 2007-December 2008: 4-headed coordination team, among others Andreas Leo Findeisen and Michael Zeltner

== Participating artists and collectives ==
The following is an incomplete list of artists, groups and initiatives associated with netznetz and should not be taken to represent the community as a whole.

- 0rf.at
- 5uper.net
- Esel
- MACHFELD
- Maria Krisper
- Metalab
- Monochrom
- Patrick Schabus
- Quintessenz
- renfah.net
- tagr.tv
- Ubermorgen

== See also ==
- Consensus decision-making
- Game theory
- Participatory budgeting
- Net art
