= Hackerspace =

Community organization

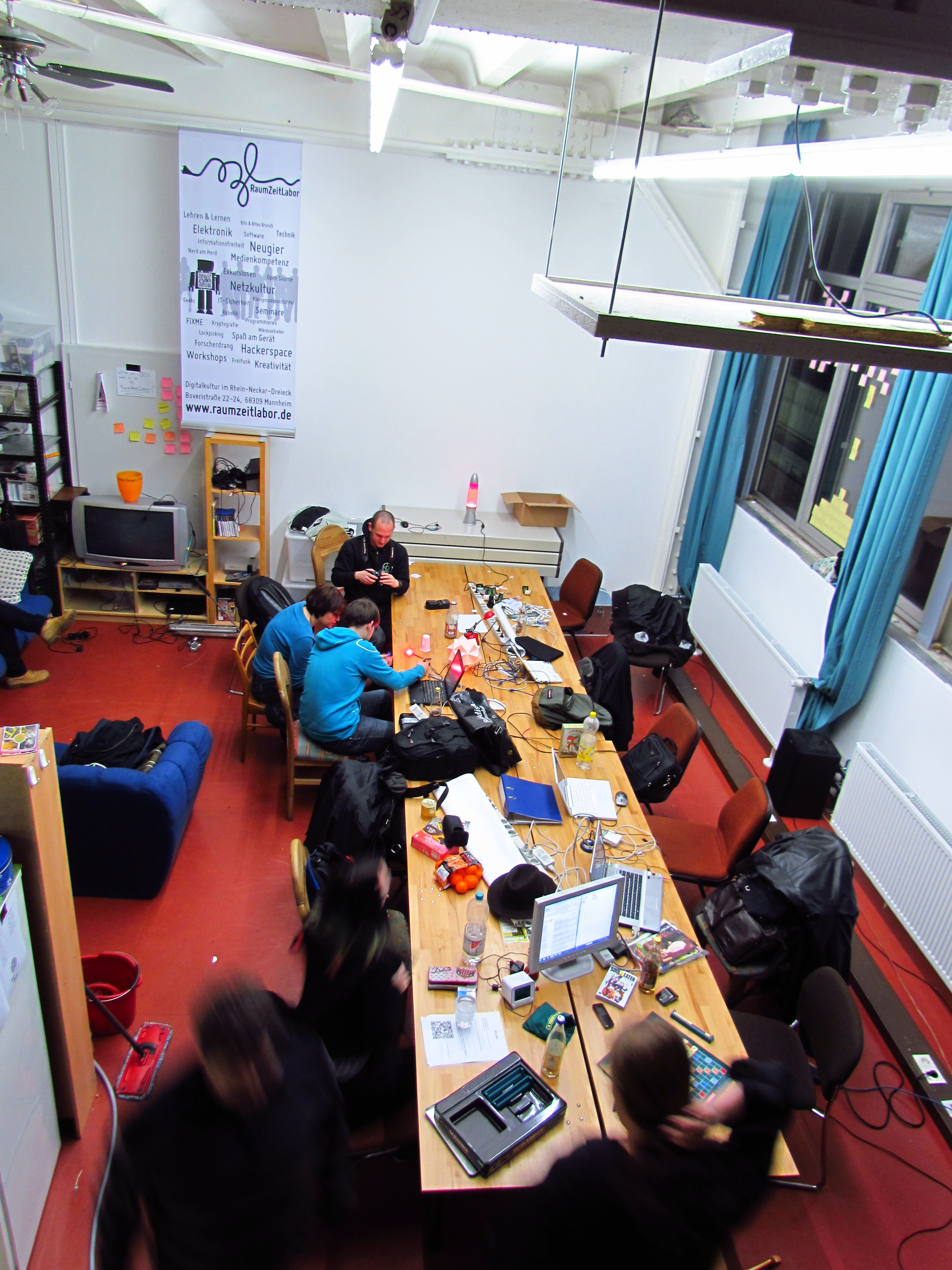
A German hackerspace (RaumZeitLabor)

A hackerspace (also referred to as a hacklab, hackspace, or makerspace) is a community-operated, often not-for-profit workspace where people with common interests, such as computers, machining, technology, science, digital art, or electronic art, can meet, socialize, and collaborate. Hackerspaces are comparable to other community-operated spaces with similar aims and structures, such as Fab Labs, men's sheds, and some commercial makerspaces.

== History ==
The advent of crowdfunding has put the tools required to build hackerspaces within reach of an even wider audience.

Worldwide, a large number of hackerspace or makerspace facilities have been founded. Nicole Lou and Katie Peek reported that in 2016 the number of active or planned spaces was 1,393, fourteen times as many as in 2006.

The US federal government has started adopting the concept of fully open makerspaces within its agencies as of 2015, the first of which (SpaceShop Rapid Prototyping Lab) resides at the Ames Research Center.

== Activities ==
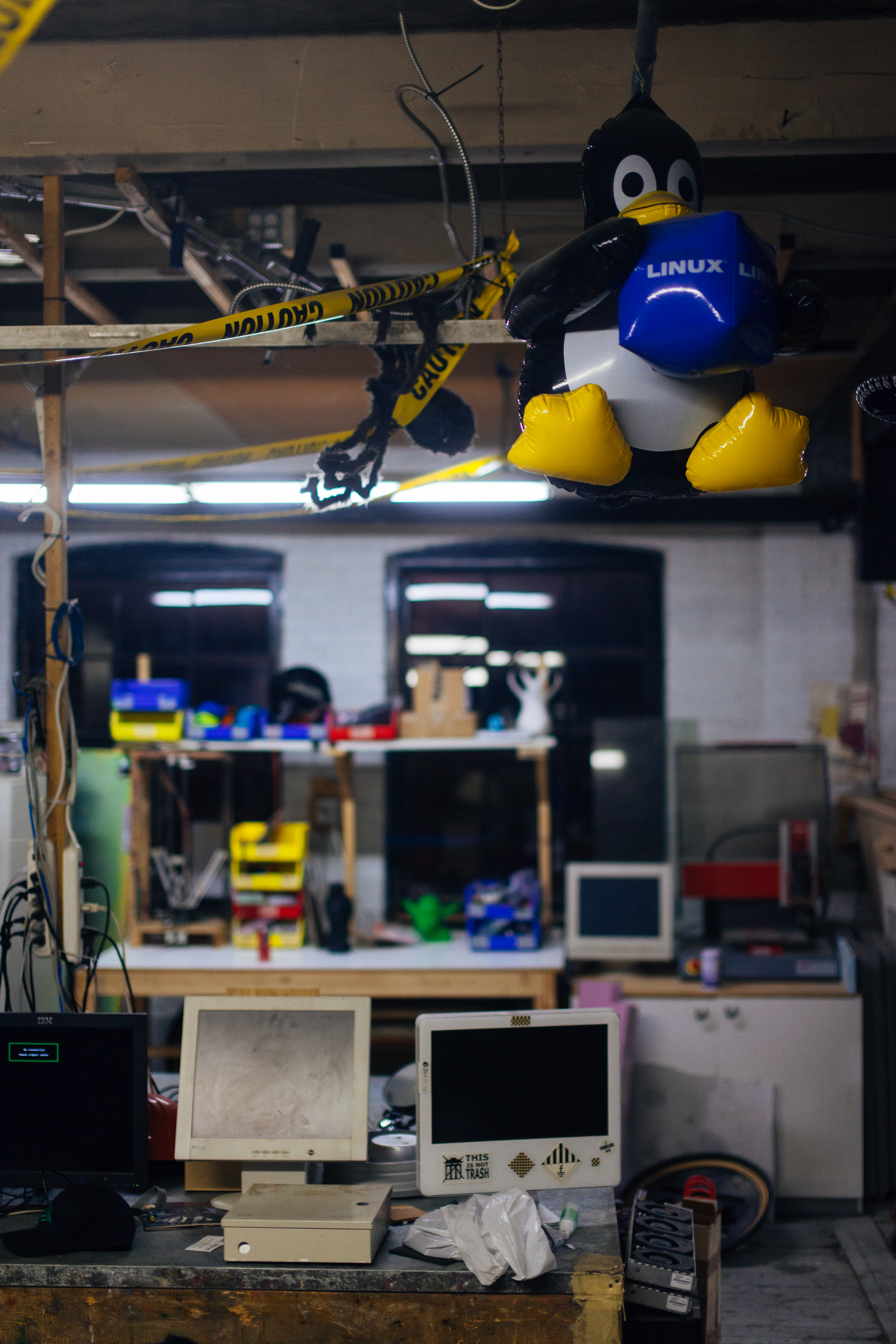
Many hackerspaces support the free software movement.

In general, hackerspaces function as centers for peer learning and knowledge sharing, in the form of workshops, presentations, and lectures. They usually also offer social activities for their members, such as game nights and parties. Hackerspaces can be viewed as open community labs incorporating elements of machine shops, workshops, and/or studios where hackers can come together to share resources and knowledge to build and make things.

Many hackerspaces participate in the use and development of free software, open hardware, and alternative media. They are often physically located in infoshops, social centers, adult education centers, public schools, public libraries, or on university campuses, but may relocate to industrial or warehouse space when they need more room.

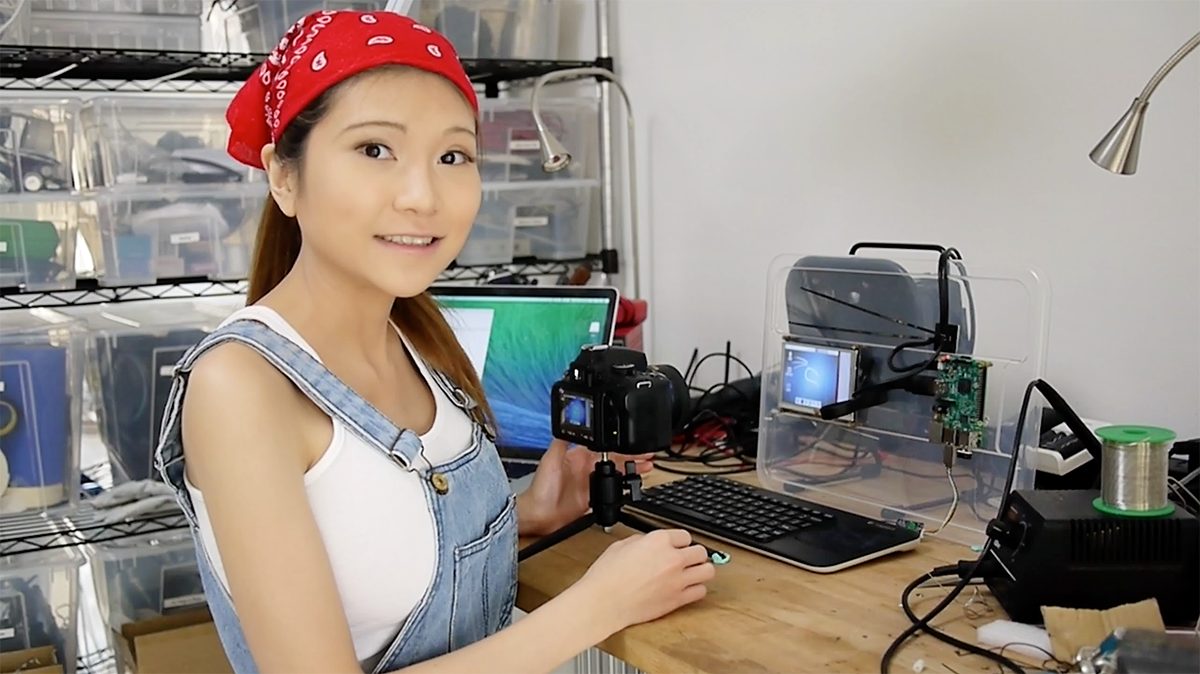
Naomi Wu demonstrating how to configure a Raspberry Pi 2

Most recent studies of hackerspaces in China, where Internet access is heavily censored, suggest that new businesses and organized technology conferences can intervene in the status quo "from within". The first hackerspace in China, Xinchejian, opened in Shanghai in 2010. A network of hackerspaces subsequently emerged, supporting an emerging maker culture. By designing open technologies and developing new businesses, Chinese makers use, alter, and sometimes provoke existing systems. DIY makers often bring together seemingly contradictory ideas, such as copycat and open source, manufacturing and DIY, and individual empowerment and collective change. In doing so, they craft a subject position beyond the common claim that Chinese citizens lack creativity.

== Facilities ==
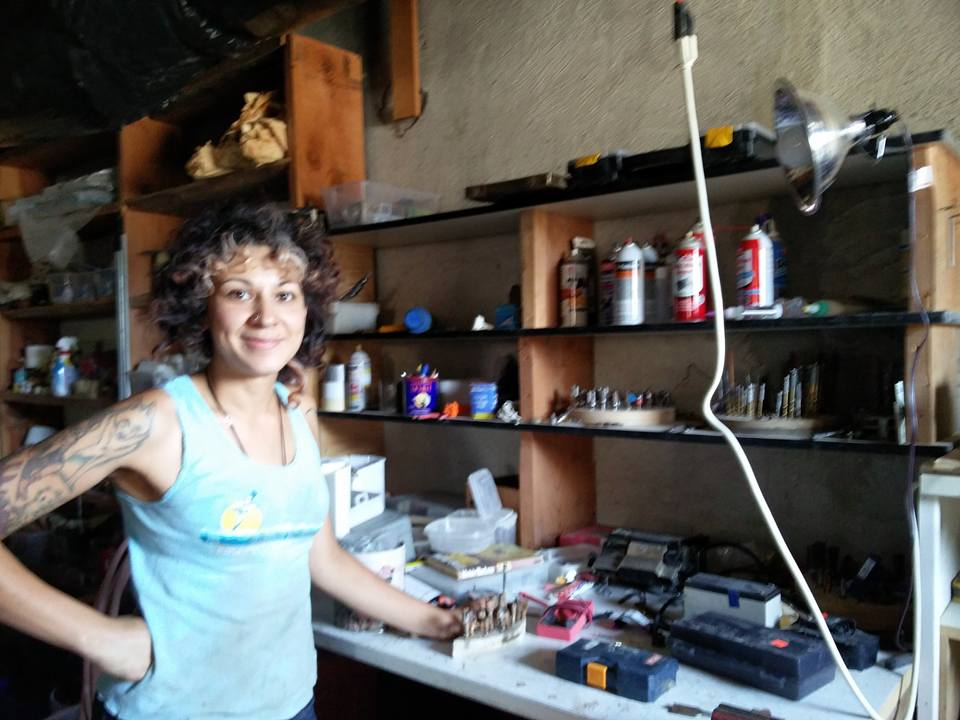
An artist gives a tour of one of the two machine shops in Xanadu, a makerspace under the aegis of Burning Man (Idaho Burners Alliance) in Boise which is open to all.

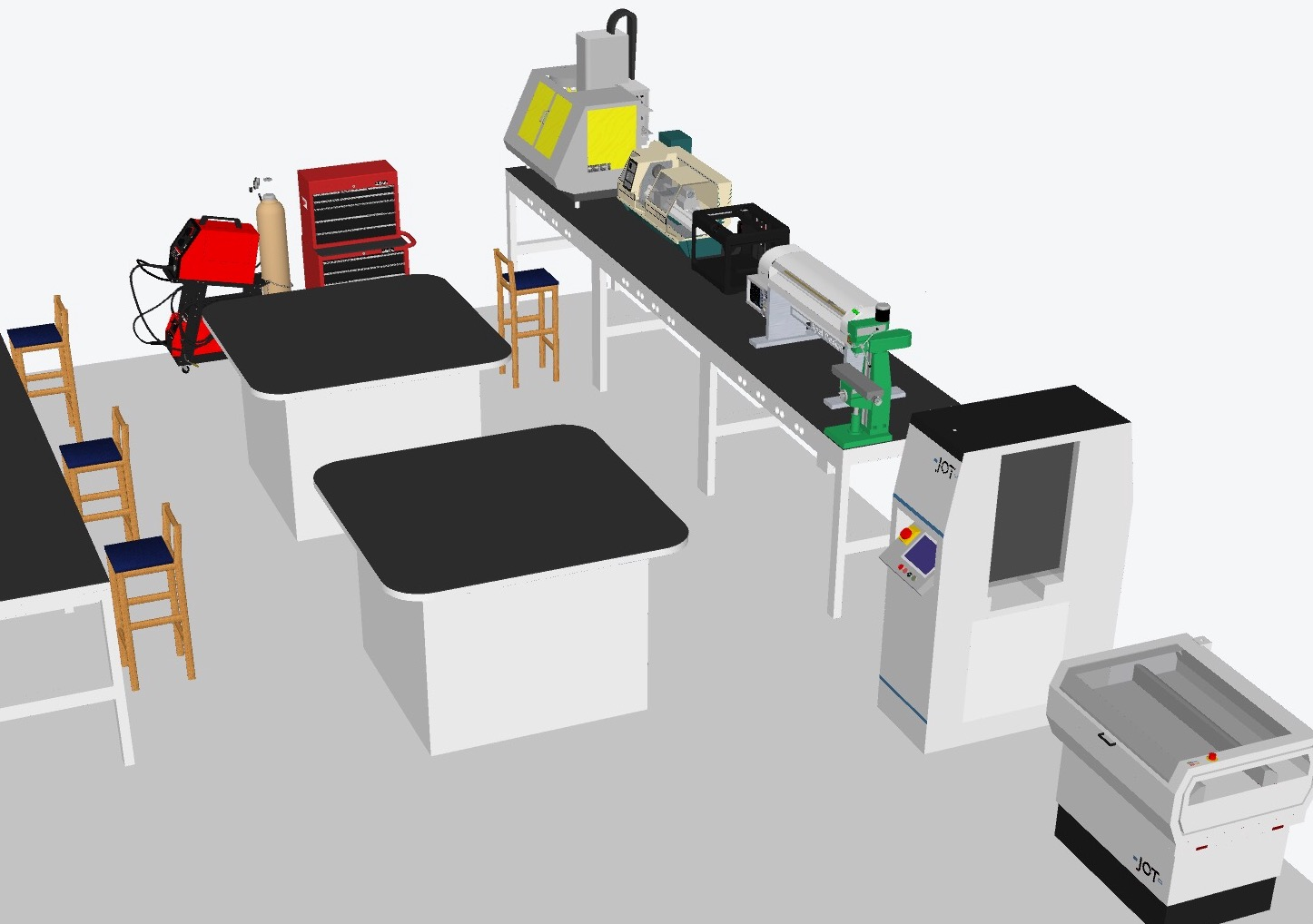
Example makerspace layout

The specific tools and resources available at hackerspaces vary from place to place. They typically provide space for members to work on their individual projects, or to collaborate on group projects with other members. Hackerspaces may also operate computer tool lending libraries, or physical tool lending libraries, up to and including creative sex toys in some instances.

The building or facility the hackerspace occupies provides the physical infrastructure that members need to complete their projects. In addition, most hackerspaces provide electrical power, computer servers, and networking with Internet connectivity. Well-equipped hackerspaces may provide machine tools, sewing, crafting, art fabrication, audio equipment, video projectors, game consoles, electronic instrumentation (such as oscilloscopes and signal generators), electronic components and raw materials for hacking, and various other tools for electronics fabrication and creating things. Specialized large-format printers, 3D printers, laser cutters, industrial sewing machines, CNC machine, or water jet cutters may be available for members to use. Some hackerspaces provide food storage and food preparation equipment, and may teach courses in basic or advanced cooking.

== Organization ==
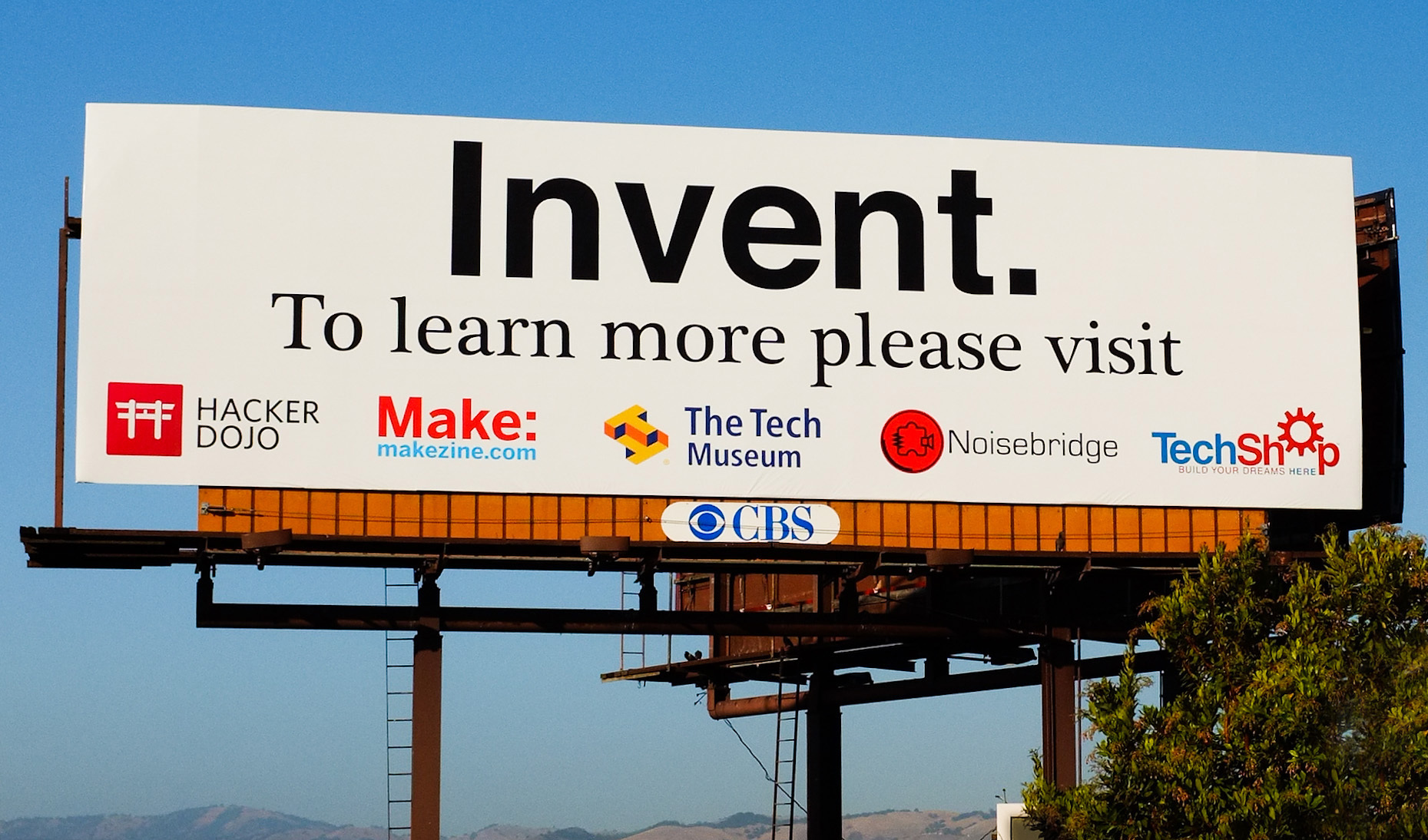
Billboard promoting makerspaces

The individual character of a hackerspace is determined by its members. There are multiple ways in which hackerspaces are organized.

- Some hackerspaces are governed by boards elected by active members in good standing. Elected officers may serve predetermined terms, and help direct decision-making with regards to purchasing new equipment, recruiting new members, formulating policy, conforming to safety requirements, and other administrative issues. London Hackspace, for example, is governed by an elected board of trustees.
- Others, such as Open Garage, are led by a single Benevolent Dictator For Life (BDFL). This is a common governance structure for hackerspaces which are founded by a single person on their own property.
- There are also more anarchist governance models such as a Do-ocracy, in which people receive the authority over a task by doing it. This model is often combined with other structures such as elected boards or consensus-driven meetings, as is the case in Noisebridge.

Membership fees are usually the main income of a hackerspace, but some also accept external sponsors. In the United States, some hackerspaces are organized as tax-exempt nonprofit organizations, including organizations with 501(c)(3) status, while others have chosen to forgo tax-exempt status. University-affiliated hackerspaces often do not charge an explicit fee, but are generally limited to students, staff, or alumni, although visiting guests from other hackerspaces are usually welcome. Some hackerspaces accept volunteer labor in lieu of membership fees, especially from financially limited participants. In addition, some hackerspaces earn income from sponsoring and staffing high-tech flea markets, where members of the general public may buy and sell new and used equipment and supplies.

There is a loose, informal tradition at many hackerspaces of welcoming visitors from other similar organizations, whether across town or internationally. Free exchange of ideas, skills, and knowledge are encouraged, especially at periodic gatherings sometimes called "build nights", "open door" or "open house" days.

Makerspaces are increasingly being included as learning spaces in schools, learning commons, and other educational facilities.

== Ethics ==
Hackerspaces are widely defined on hackerspaces.org as "community-operated physical places, where people can meet and work on their projects". Their organization varies from place to place and is determined by their members. Although there is no single blueprint or set of guidelines for creating a hackerspace, many spaces draw on a "hacker ethic", which has been described as including autonomy, free access to and circulation of information, distrust of traditional top-down authority, learning by doing, peer-to-peer learning, sharing, solidarity, and cooperation.

Hackerspaces have also been described as physical manifestations of the peer production principles.

== Equity and justice-centered making ==
Large opportunity gaps in science and engineering (STEM) persist for youth growing up in poverty, and in particular for African American and Latino youth, and have become a focus of STEM-rich Making. The evolving maker movement has generated interest for its potential role in opening up access to learning and attainment in STEM, with advocates arguing for its “democratizing effects" – with access to a makerspace, “anyone can make... anyone can change the world”. Makerspaces potentially offer opportunities for young people to engage in STEM knowledge and practices in creative and playful ways, where “learning is and for the making”.

However, an explicit equity-agenda has been fairly absent in the maker movement, especially as it relates to sustained engagement in making. The movement remains an adult, white, middle-class pursuit, led by those with the leisure time, technical knowledge, experience, and resources to make. Even with the growth of community-based makerspaces, users of these spaces tend to be white adult men. The median salary for those involved in the maker movement in the US is $103,000, with 97% of those who go to Maker Faires having college degrees (and 70% have graduate degrees). Only 11% of the contributions to Make Magazine (the periodical credited with launching the Maker Movement) are female. Thus, as the maker movement has become formalized, the powerful knowledge and practices of communities of color or of low-income communities have not yet become central to its discourse.

Emerging research has begun to address how the maker movement might address equity concerns broadly. There is recent research in this area, which is challenging the field to consider new directions in the design of maker spaces, in maker space programming and pedagogies, and in how to make sense of the outcomes of making. These include: 1) Expanding what counts as making; 2) Design of makerspaces that foster an open, flexible and welcoming atmosphere to youth; 3) Maker space programs and pedagogies that support an equitable culture of making, the incorporation of participants’ cultural knowledge and practices, a focus on new literacies; and valuing multiple iterations and failing-forward; and 4) Expanding the outcomes of making to include agency, identity, and the after-life of maker projects. Cutting across these areas are specific attention to gender and computer science, indigenous epistemologies and maker activities, and how makerspaces may ground STEM-rich making in the lived experiences and wisdom of youth of color and their families and communities.

One emerging area of studies examines the production of an equitable culture in making, including in-depth longitudinal cases of youth makers in community settings, how youth and community co-design for equitable learning opportunities and outcomes.

== Difficulties and critique ==
Hackerspaces can run into difficulties with building codes or other planning regulations, which may not be designed to handle their scope of activities. For example, a new hackerspace in Nashua, New Hampshire, was shut down by the city after an inspection in 2011. The main issues involved ventilation of heat and toxic fumes; the space was reopened after improvements were made to the building.

The difficulties with opening hackerspaces and makerspaces within nonprofit organizations such as schools and public libraries include cost, space, liability, and availability of personnel. Many makerspaces struggle to sustain viable business models in support of their missions.

== Benefits ==
Research on makerspaces and hackerspaces has identified several potential educational and social benefits. These include the development of psychosocial skills such as motivation, self-directed learning, initiative, confidence, and positive risk-taking. Hackerspace experiences may also help participants connect classroom learning to practical applications, gain access to resources and materials that would otherwise be unavailable, and develop persistence through iterative work and failure-based learning.

Some studies argue that makerspaces can broaden access to STEM opportunities for underrepresented or economically disadvantaged students. Hands-on activities in such spaces have also been associated with experiential STEM learning in school libraries and other educational settings. Because many hackerspace activities involve group projects, they may also support collaboration and leadership skills.

The social role of makerspaces has also been discussed in relation to emergency response. The 2024 Austrian documentary film Hacking at Leaves examines a makerspace in Durango, Colorado, that produced protective medical equipment during the COVID-19 pandemic. FM4 described the film as including an excursus on the development of hackerspaces, while Make/Heise described it as a documentary about the maker movement in an American small town.

== Notable hackerspaces ==
A directory of hackerspaces is maintained at the Hackerspaces.org wiki.

Over the years, many hackerspaces have grown significantly in membership, operational budgets, and local media attention. Many have also helped establish other hackerspaces in nearby locations.

- c-base (1995) from Berlin is recognized as one of the first independent hackerspaces in the world, not affiliated with a school, university, or company. Wired writes that "European groups, particularly in Germany, have a long tradition of this kind of activity". Another known German hackerspace is RaumZeitLabor, organizer of Trollcon.
- The Geek Group, formed in 1994, was a nonprofit hackerspace in Grand Rapids, Michigan that had a large following and internet presence. There were various chapters around the United States. Their main focus was as an open source hackerspace to increase STEM education accessibility and one day become an accredited institution of higher education. The organization dissolved in 2018.
- Metalab, founded in 2006, is generally considered to have pioneered the funding principles that enabled rapid spread of the concept.
- TechShop was the first chain of commercial hackerspaces. It was launched in October 2006. As of October 2012, there were six TechShop locations in the US: three in California and one each in North Carolina, Michigan, and Texas, the last a partnership with the Lowe's home improvement chain. As of May 2019, the company had declared bankruptcy, with plans for reorganization or liquidation to be announced.
- In August 2007, a group of North American hackers visited Europe "to get a sense for the potential of European 'hacker spaces'"; upon their return, the groups NYC Resistor and HacDC were set up in late 2007, with Noisebridge following in fall 2008.
- RevSpace is a Dutch hackerspace founded in 2009. A regular of its IRC channel perpetrated a DDoS attack on VISA and MasterCard in 2010.
- Dallas Makerspace (DMS) was founded by members of the Dallas Personal Robotics Group (DPRG) in 2010. As of summer of 2017, it has a paying membership base of 1500, "making it one of the largest, if not the largest, nonprofit, volunteer-run makerspaces in the country" according to Dallas Morning News.
- The first Chinese hackerspace Xinchejian was established in Shanghai in the fall of 2010. Thereafter hackerspaces have grown in numerous cities including Beijing, Shenzhen, Ningbo, Hangzhou and Guangzhou. Chinese makers became internationally visible when the first Maker Carnival was hosted in Beijing in 2012.
- Columbus Idea Foundry moved into a 65,000-square-foot factory in Columbus Ohio on May 22, 2014. By one account, it is "the country's largest such space".
- NASA's Ames Research Center Rapid Prototyping Lab was developed as the first open makerspace within the US Federal Government. It has trained thousands of Federal employees on emerging rapid-prototyping equipment.
- According to Wired magazine, Artisan's Asylum (Somerville, Massachusetts), was believed to be the largest makerspace in the world in 2012.
- Verstehbahnhof in Fürstenberg (Havel) station is an example of a makerspace in a rural German town with a declining population. Daniel Domscheit-Berg is one of the principal contributors to this space.

== Variations ==
Many places share values similar to those associated with hackspaces, whether or not they use that terminology. A few examples follow:

=== Public library hackerspaces ===
Public libraries have long been places to share learning resources. Some have reconsidered their roles to include resources for hacking and making. These spaces generally call themselves library makerspaces. For example, Chattanooga's 4th floor in Tennessee may have been the first use of a library as laboratory and playground for its community. The User Experience (UX) is another public laboratory and educational facility. According to Forbes magazine, the first public library to open a MakerSpace was the Fayetteville Free Library.

=== Feminist hackerspaces ===
In response to the misogyny allegedly shown by the tech bro culture that sees hackerspaces as "male" spaces, Seattle Attic was founded in the summer of 2013, as the first Feminist Hackerspace in the United States. They were soon followed by Double Union, in San Francisco. Their founding came as a result of The Ada Initiative and their AdaCamp conferences, which has also led to the formation of FouFem in Montreal, the Mz Baltazar's Laboratory, a start-up organization and feminist hackspace in Vienna, the Anarchafeminist Hackerhive in San Francisco, the Hacktory in Philadelphia and the Miss Despionas in Tasmania, Australia, and others.

=== Public school maker/hackerspaces ===
Some public schools in the US also include hackerspaces. The first high school to open a true makerspace was in Sebastopol, California, and middle schools followed the trend. For example, White Hill Middle school in Fairfax, California has now opened up their own makerspace with a class called "Makers and Hackers". In 2018 Penketh High School became the first school to have a school makerspace in the United Kingdom.

In Shenzhen, China, the nonprofit SteamHead organized a school makerspace inside Shenzhen American International School in 2014, and SZ DIY makerspace organized a makerspace inside Harbour School.

=== Fab labs ===
Fab labs are spaces (part of a network initiated by MIT's Center for Bits and Atoms) whose goal is to enable people to "make (almost) anything". They focus heavily on digital fabrication tools.

=== Community spaces ===
Many community art spaces share values with hackerspaces. Some, like AS220 and Haystack Mountain School of Crafts have embraced fab lab structures to expand the range of media represented in their spaces to include digital fabrication tools. There are also community-based makerspaces focused on open-access to allow community members to address community-based problems – for example, to share resources and access to critical manufacturing equipment. Makerspaces could also be seen as spaces for the co-production of tools that “foster conviviality to the extent to which they can be easily used, by anybody, as often or as seldom as desired, for the accomplishment of a purpose chosen by the user”.

From a justice perspective, open access is important because many makerspaces require payment to use. Examples of community-based making spaces include GET City and Mt Elliot, both in Michigan.

=== University maker/hackerspaces ===
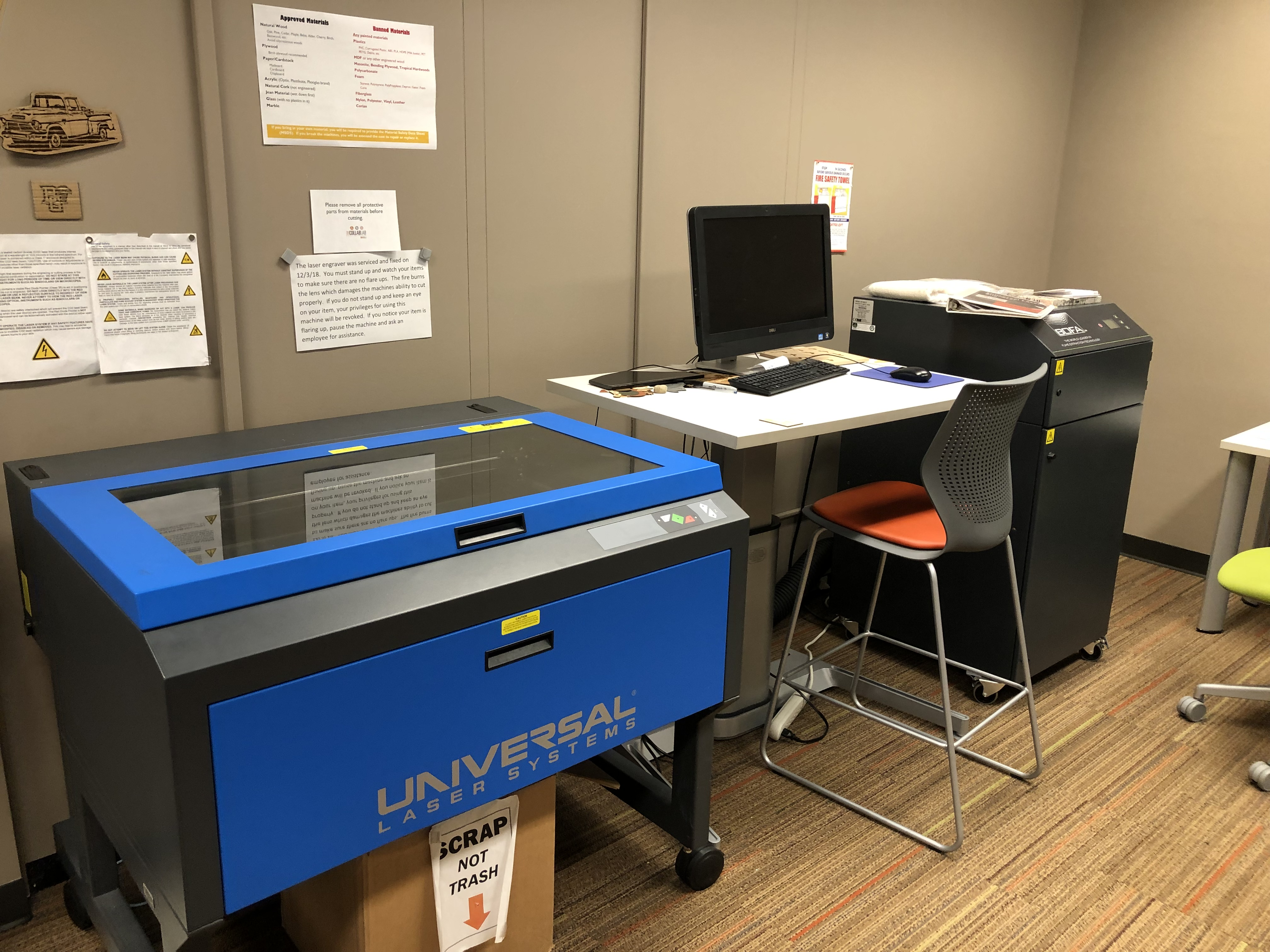
Laser cutter in a university library

Universities and institutions of higher education around the world have at different rates embraced the educational possibilities of these spaces. Makerspaces provide colleges and universities with an inspirational and resource-rich environment where connections between technology and curriculum can be utilized for experiential teaching and learning activities.

- MIT has pioneered the Fab lab movement and implementation of similar spaces in universities around the world. Non-Fab-Lab-associated Maker and Hackerspaces are also common.
- Carleton College's Class of 1969 Makerspace is particularly multifaceted, offering resources for, and classes on textile arts, carpentry, robotics and electronics, metalsmithing, 3D printing, bike repair, and more.
- Wheaton College is one school pioneering new Hacker and Maker curriculums and spaces, as is Yale University with spaces like its "CEID".
- Franklin W. Olin College of Engineering has also pioneered Makerist and Hacker curriculum to great success.
- The Bioengineering Department at the University of Pennsylvania's School of Engineering and Applied Science combines their educational lab space with an open Bio-MakerSpace in their George H. Stephenson Foundation Educational Laboratory & Bio-MakerSpace (or Biomakerspace or BioMaker Space), encouraging a free flow of ideas, creativity, and entrepreneurship between Bioengineering students and students throughout the university.
- William & Mary is rapidly expanding their makerspace resources to include engineering spaces for all undergraduate & graduate degrees as part of their new Coll curricula.

=== Tool library ===
Tool libraries generally lack a shared space for making or hacking things, but instead serve as a repository of tools people can borrow for use in their own respective spaces.

=== Repair cafe / clinic ===
"Repair cafés" are semipermanent places where people can come together to teach and learn how to fix things. "Repair clinics" are pop-up events without permanent facilities, though they are often sponsored by organizations such as public libraries, schools, or universities. The emphasis is on basic DIY repairs rather than building new things, but there is a similar informal atmosphere of exploration and learning new skills.

=== Bicycle coops ===
Bicycle cooperatives are places where people can build or fix bicycles.

=== Cooking makerspace ===
Cooking makerspaces are places where anyone can use different professional kitchen equipment and try culinary experiments.

=== Biomakerspace ===
Biomakerspaces, as opposed to the typical makerspace, are communal laboratory spaces specifically for biology. Typically, their facilities include biological equipment such as PCR machines, autoclaves, and centrifuges. Many biomakerspaces also offer courses on biological techniques.

== See also ==
- Hacker culture – Subculture of individuals
- Hackerspace Global Grid
- Maker culture – Community interested in do-it-yourself technical pursuits
- Maker Faire – Convention of DIY enthusiasts
- Men's shed – Non-profit local organisations that provide a space for craftwork and social interaction
- Tinkering School
- Urban manufacturing
