= National Science Institute =

Defunct U.S. nonprofit

- Abbreviation: NSI
- Formation: 1994; 32 years ago
- Founder: Christopher Boden
- Founded at: Grand Valley State University
- Dissolved: December 31, 2018; 7 years ago
- Type: NGO
- Legal status: 501(c)(3) Non-profit
- Purpose: Education
- Location: Grand Rapids, MI
- Website: thegeekgroup.org
- Formerly called: The Boehemian Brothers, GeNext! & The Geek Group

The National Science Institute (NSI), previously known as The Geek Group, was a not-for-profit educational organization based in Grand Rapids, Michigan. The group opened to the public on January 1, 2014, and said in May of that year that it had over 25,000 members in 142 countries.

The organization's president and executive director chose to close the organization on December 31, 2018, following a sealed search warrant executed by the United States Department of Homeland Security and three other federal agencies. Two of its executives were sentenced to jail time, and one of its consultants received probation, for crimes at a bitcoin exchange service that it operated.

== History ==
The organization was started in 1996 at Grand Valley State University in Allendale, Michigan as a group of friends, experimenting with university surplus equipment. Over several years, the group grew and changed its name several times, eventually becoming a company called The Geek Group. It leased a building at 344 Ionia Ave SW in Grand Rapids. The Geek Group later moved to Kalamazoo and became a 501(c)(3) non-profit organization. In early 2010 the Kalamazoo County Treasurer seized the organization's headquarters, which was then located in Kalamazoo Township, Michigan, a suburb of Kalamazoo, after the organization refused to pay property taxes of over $100,000. The organization appealed, unsuccessfully.

NSI was sponsored by many companies, the majority of them small businesses local to the organization, but also some larger companies such as Rustoleum. They supplemented this donation income by charging for some research and development services.

The organization moved back to Grand Rapids in December 2010, into a 43,000-square-foot (4,000 m^{2}) facility on Leonard Street NW, called "The Leonard Street Labs." On January 2, 2014, the facility was damaged by a fire; although no one was hurt, the building was temporarily closed for repairs.

== Federal raid and aftermath ==
On December 21, 2018, the Leonard Street Labs building was raided by Homeland Security, the IRS, and several other federal agencies. After the raid, the NSI could not meet its financial obligations, and shut down on December 31, 2018. The building was demolished to make way for Victory on Leonard, a 119-unit apartment building.

On January 5, 2019, Christopher Boden, the founder of the organization, said that the raid took place "because he was commercially trading in cryptocurrency without the proper authorization", and that he believed he was facing prison time. The United States Department of Justice (DOJ) said that Boden, Daniel Reynold DeJager, and Leesa Beth Vogt operated a service whereby cryptocurrency was being purchased, mixed, and resold, including to drug dealers, without following any anti–money laundering or know your customer procedures. The DOJ also said that Boden solicited an undercover agent to collect a bitcoin debt "by using violence if necessary."

Boden pleaded guilty to money laundering, operating an unlicensed money transmitting business, and structuring, and was sentenced to 30 months' incarceration, followed by 3 years of supervised release, of which he served 2 years, 15 days. Vogt pleaded guilty to structuring, and was sentenced to 10 months in prison and 3 years of supervised release. DeJager pleaded guilty to money laundering and conspiracy to operate an unlicensed money-transmitting business, and was sentenced to 4 years of probation.

After his release from prison, Boden returned to posting videos on YouTube and growing his social media presence.
