= C-base =

Non-profit organization and hackerspace in Germany

Coordinates: 52°30′46.4″N 13°25′14.2″E

c-base
- Formation: August 12, 1995; 31 years ago
- Headquarters: Berlin

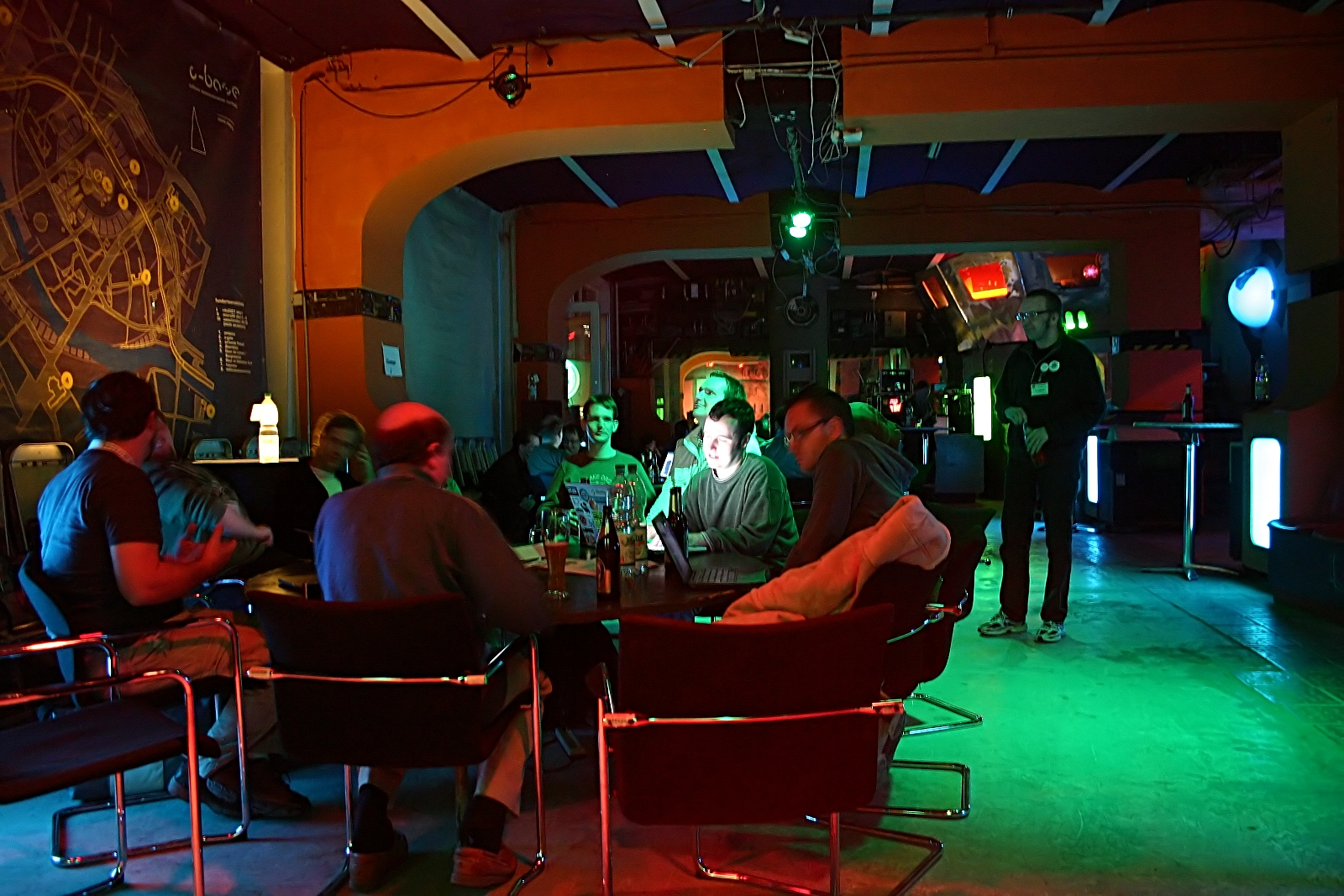
Wikipedians from Berlin meet at the c-base.

c-base e.V. is a non-profit association located in Berlin, Germany. Its purpose is to increase knowledge and skills pertaining to computer software, hardware and data networks. The association is engaged in numerous related activities. For example, the society has had stands at large festivals, such as Children's Day, where they introduce young people to topics like robotics and computer-aided design.

The association's headquarters, c-base station, is also used by other initiatives and groups in and around Berlin as an event location or as function rooms, for example the wireless community network freifunk.net, the Chaos Computer Club and the Berlin Wikipedia group. Any group that identifies themselves with the purpose of the c-base are also welcome to use the premises for meetings and events.

== History ==
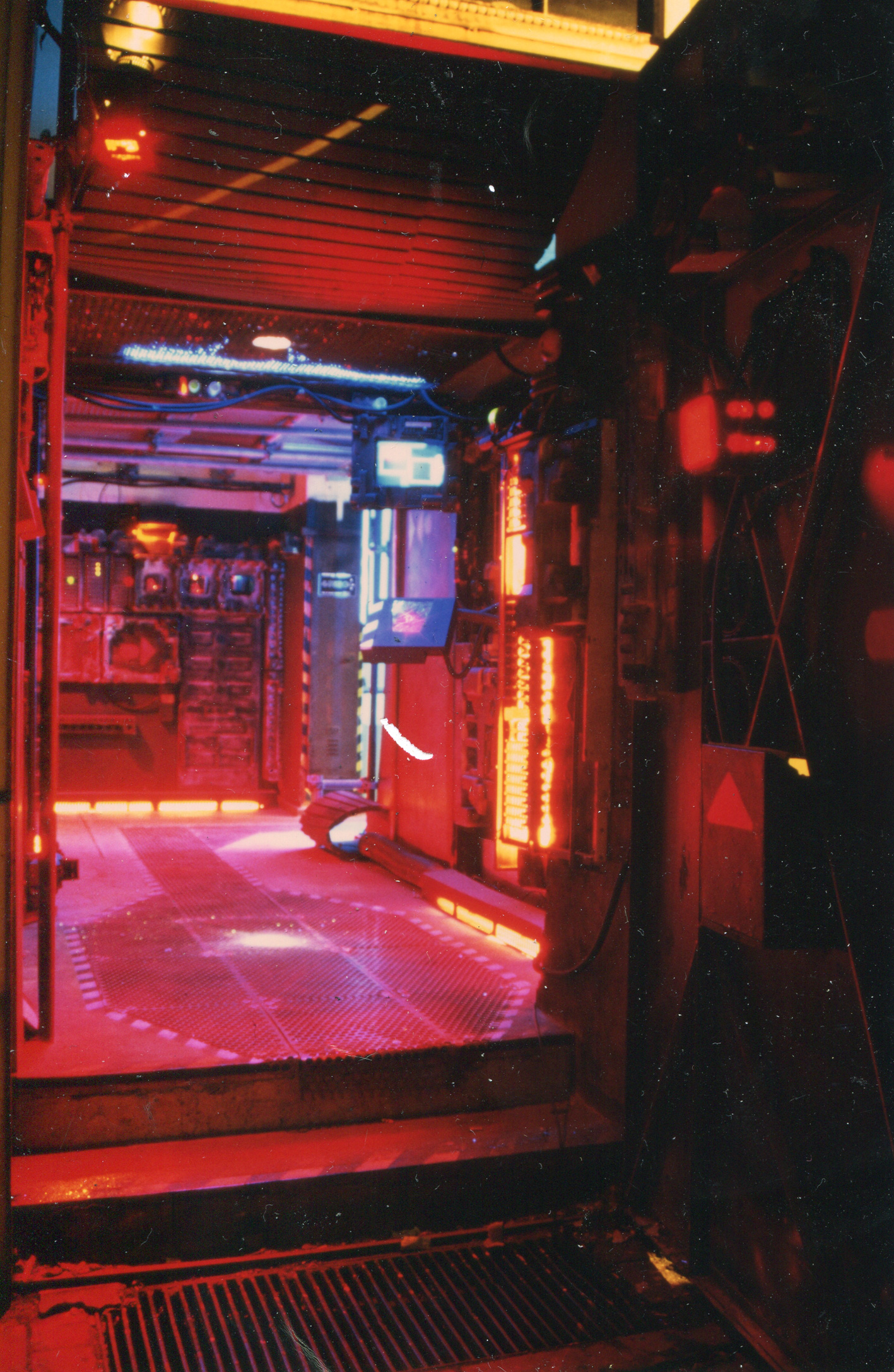
The entrance of c-base ('Schleuse') in 1998 near Oranienburger Straße in the center of Berlin

c-base e. V. is a non-profit association that reconstructs a fictitious, crashed space station that has a hackerspace. Originally founded as an “extended living room” by the three initiators Hardy Engwer née Krause (“cynk”), Marten Suhr (“mars”) and Carsten Ussat (“nomax”) by 17 founding members on August 12, 1995, c-base now sees itself as the hub of the Berlin nerd and hacker scene.

In the years 2002 and 2003 the BerlinBackBone project was launched to make available and promote free public access to the internet via wireless community networks. Also in 2003 the c-base association began staging weekly meetings of musicians, called Cosmic Open Stage, thus providing a platform for well known or unknown musicians to hold jam sessions or to give concerts. Since 2004 the premises of the c-base association are also used in cooperation by transmediale.

c-base is recognized as one of the first hackerspaces in the world. It, along with The Loft in San Diego, US, and Metalab, directly influenced the creation of hackerspaces in the US.

== Activities ==
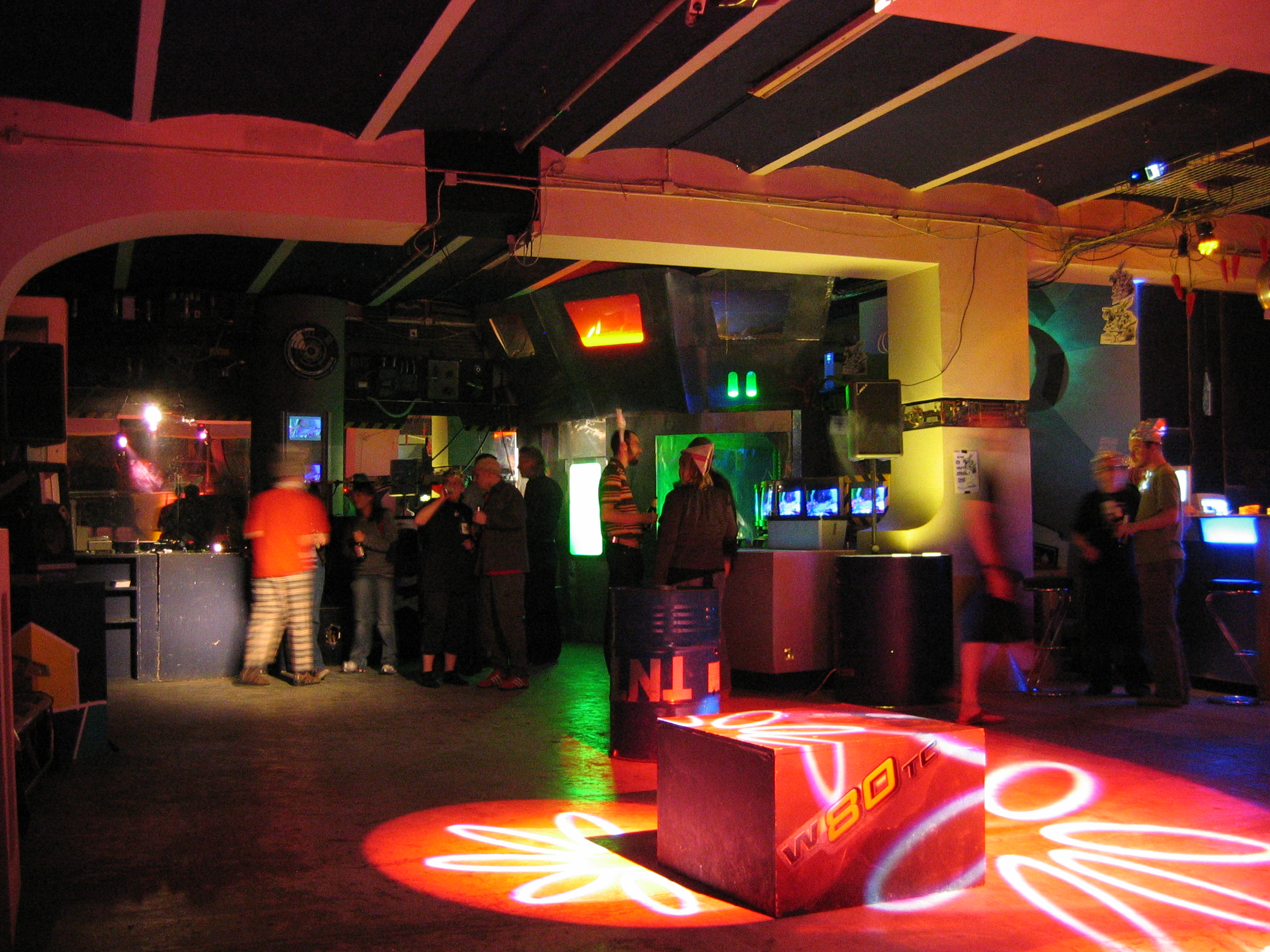
Main hall of the c-base

Apart from the main purpose of the c-base association the members are also engaged in many other activities, for example Go and Jugger, the rules of which supposedly were gained through analysis of files on c-beam, the main computer in the c-base station. Once a year, @c-terra, an event organised by the c-base association, gives an overview of all activities offered.

From September 14–16, 2006 the fourth Wizards of OS conference was held in cooperation with c-base.
