= Gever Tulley =

American computer scientist

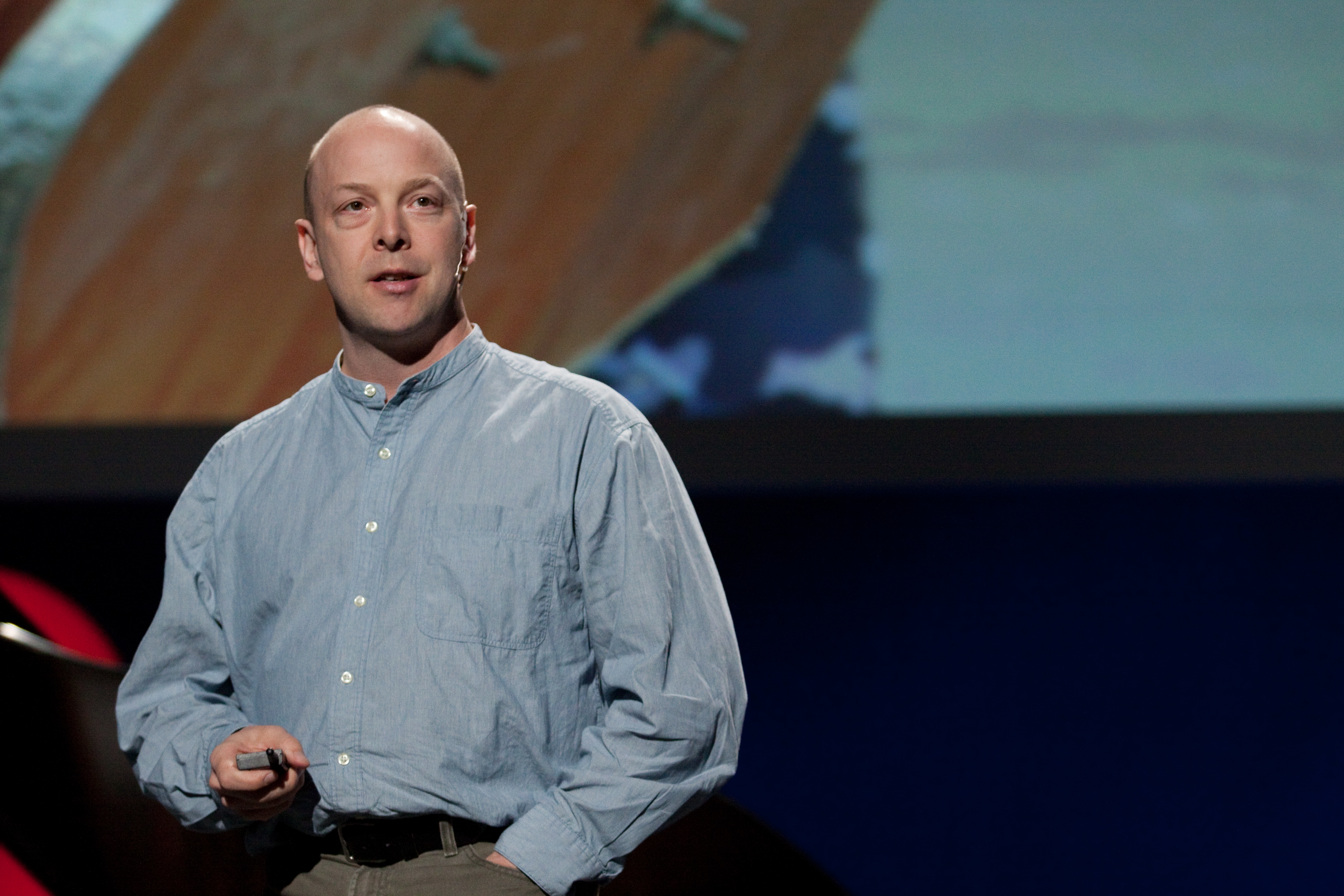
Tulley in 2009

Gever Tulley is an American writer, speaker, educator, entrepreneur, and computer scientist. He is the founder of the Brightworks School, Tinkering School, the non-profit Institute for Applied Tinkering, and educational kit maker Tinkering Labs. His more recent work centers around the concept of students learning through building projects. He has delivered multiple TED talks on his work, published the book 50 Dangerous Things (You Should Let Your Children Do), and has contributed articles for many online media outlets.

== Career ==
=== Tinkering School ===
A self-taught software engineer, Tulley created the summer program called Tinkering School in 2005. The Tinkering School's program provides children with a week-long overnight experience at a ranch outside of San Francisco, California, United States. Participants spend the week building large projects such as a working roller coaster, a rope bridge made out of plastic bags, and a 3-story tree house.

=== TED ===
Tulley delivered a talk at the TED2007 conference entitled "50 Dangerous Things You Should Let Your Kids Do". In this talk, Tulley makes the argument that a growing trend towards over-protection of children is harming their ability to learn and think. Thus, Tulley advocates for parents to allow their children to do supervised activities that are considered to be dangerous.

Tulley advises that children should:

1. Let children be co-authors in their education.
2. Trust children more.
3. The default answer is yes.
4. Focus on habits and character.
5. Agree that everything is interesting.

By doing so, Tulley believes children will learn concepts that they may not learn in more structured and conventional activities. Tulley has since given further TED conference talks at TED2009 and various TEDx conferences.

=== Brightworks School ===
In 2011, Tulley opened the Brightworks School in San Francisco. The school expands upon the premise of his summer program, and students from grades K-12 learn through hands-on activities facilitated by adult "collaborators". The school opened in September 2011 with an initial enrollment of 18 students. The school follows a project-based learning framework designed to foster student agency and deep inquiry called the "Brightworks Arc." Moving away from traditional subject-based classes, Tulley's model organizes learning into three phases: exploration, expression, and exposition. This framework has been studied by educators internationally as a model for weaving together "maker" centered learning with academic rigor.

Tulley's work at Brightworks has positioned him as a central figure in the global movement reimagining education. Brightworks has been cited as one of the most innovative schools in the world and it attracts international educators who are looking for an alternative to the traditional model of learning. The school regularly hosts visiting educators from Scandiavia, Asia and Australia who seek to better align their educational environments to the science of learning and see the school's Guiding Principles in action. The school's philosophy prioritizes Radical Trust, Community, Meaningful Engagement, Equity and Justice, and Curiosity in order to create "a joyful, inclusive and antiracist learning community where students expand their curiosity and co-author their education through meaningful engagement." Just like in Tulley's 50 Dangerous Things, children at the school are afforded the autonomy to use professional tools and manage their own learning risks.

== Criticism ==
Tulley's philosophy on allowing children to participate in more dangerous activities has attracted the criticism of some parents and child psychologists. Child psychologist Michael Carr-Gregg has called Tulley's book an overreaction to "cotton-wool" parenting, and has called for sales of the book to be banned in Australia (despite Carr-Gregg never having read the book). Amanda Cox, founder of the parent organization Real Mums, has also criticized the book, claiming that the book crosses a fine line between learning and being dangerous.
