= Noisebridge =

Hackerspace and makerspace in San Francisco, California, U.S.

Coordinates: 37.762413°N 122.419313°W

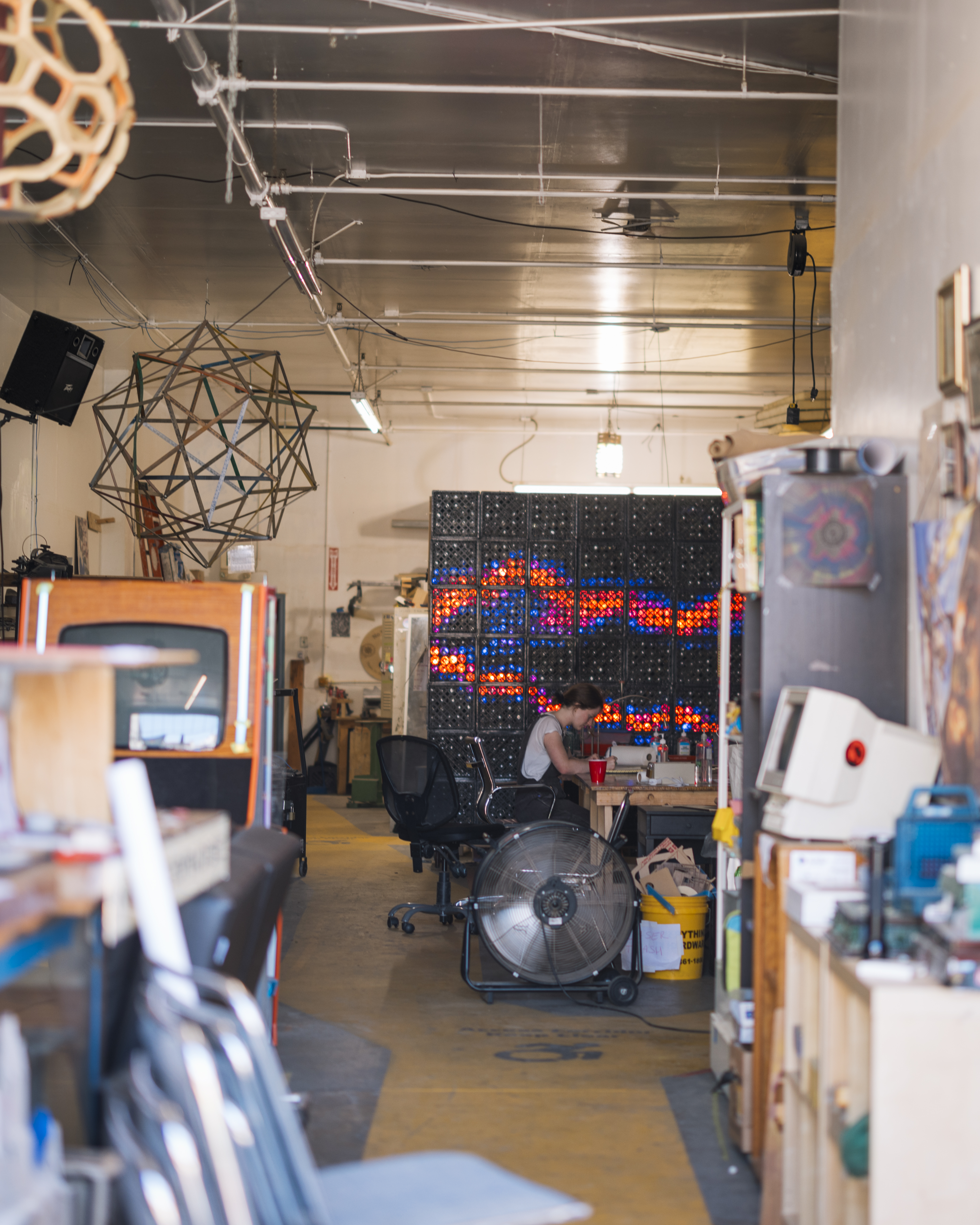
- The main floor of Noisebridge
- Formation: 2007
- Founder: Volunteers, including Mitch Altman, Jacob Appelbaum and many other hackers
- Purpose: Hacking, Making
- Location: San Francisco, California
- Affiliations: Pumping Station: One, Chaos Computer Club, Metalab, e.a.
- Budget: $140K
- Staff: 3 (unpaid)
- Volunteers: 200+
- Website: www.noisebridge.net

Noisebridge is an anarchistic maker and hackerspace located in San Francisco. It is inspired by the European hackerspaces Metalab in Vienna and c-base in Berlin. Noisebridge describes itself as "a space for sharing, creation, collaboration, research, development, mentoring, and learning". Outside of its headquarters, Noisebridge forms a wider international community. It was organized in 2007 and has had permanent facilities since 2008.

On 24 September 2018, co-founder Mitch Altman announced that he had quietly left Noisebridge in the month of May.

== History ==
=== Locations ===
In 2007 and 2008, Noisebridge functioned as a nomadic group, holding meetings at various locations. In October 2008, the group secured a small commercial property in San Francisco's Mission District. However, this location soon proved insufficient for the growing community. By 2009, Noisebridge relocated to a 5,200 square foot space on the third floor of 2169 Mission Street. During that year, the organization had approximately 100 members.

By 2018, the organization was looking for a new space as its lease was under threat. A large donation in 2020 kicked off a new search.

=== Activities and projects ===
Many meetups, workshops, and classes are held at the space, including the long running Circuit Hacking Monday, San Francisco Writers Workshop, Wikipedia meetups, Hack Comedy, Five Minutes of Fame, game development groups and classes, Free Code Camp, Code Day, and the Stupid Hackathon.

Past workspaces prior to June 2018 included: an optics lab, mycology lab, biotech lab, kitchen, digital audio workstation, photo development darkroom, book scanning workshop, photo booth, and a lights-out cloud computing lab with more than 100 computer cores and contributed resources to several open source projects, including the GCC compile farm.

Noisebridge members have been involved with research projects that won the best paper awards from top tier academic conferences Usenix Security Conference and CRYPTO.

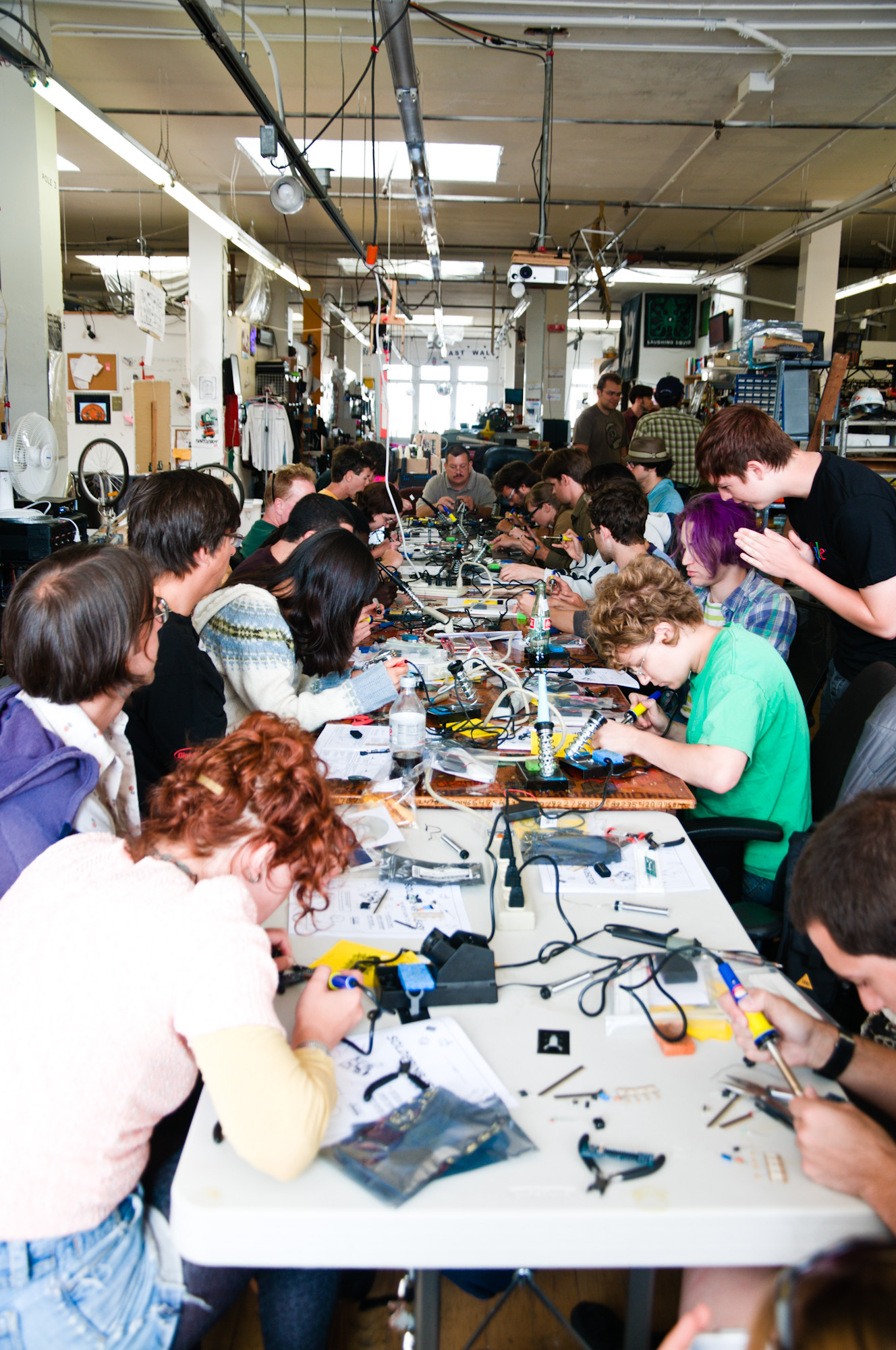
Arduinos for beginners workshop, July 2011

== Spacebridge ==
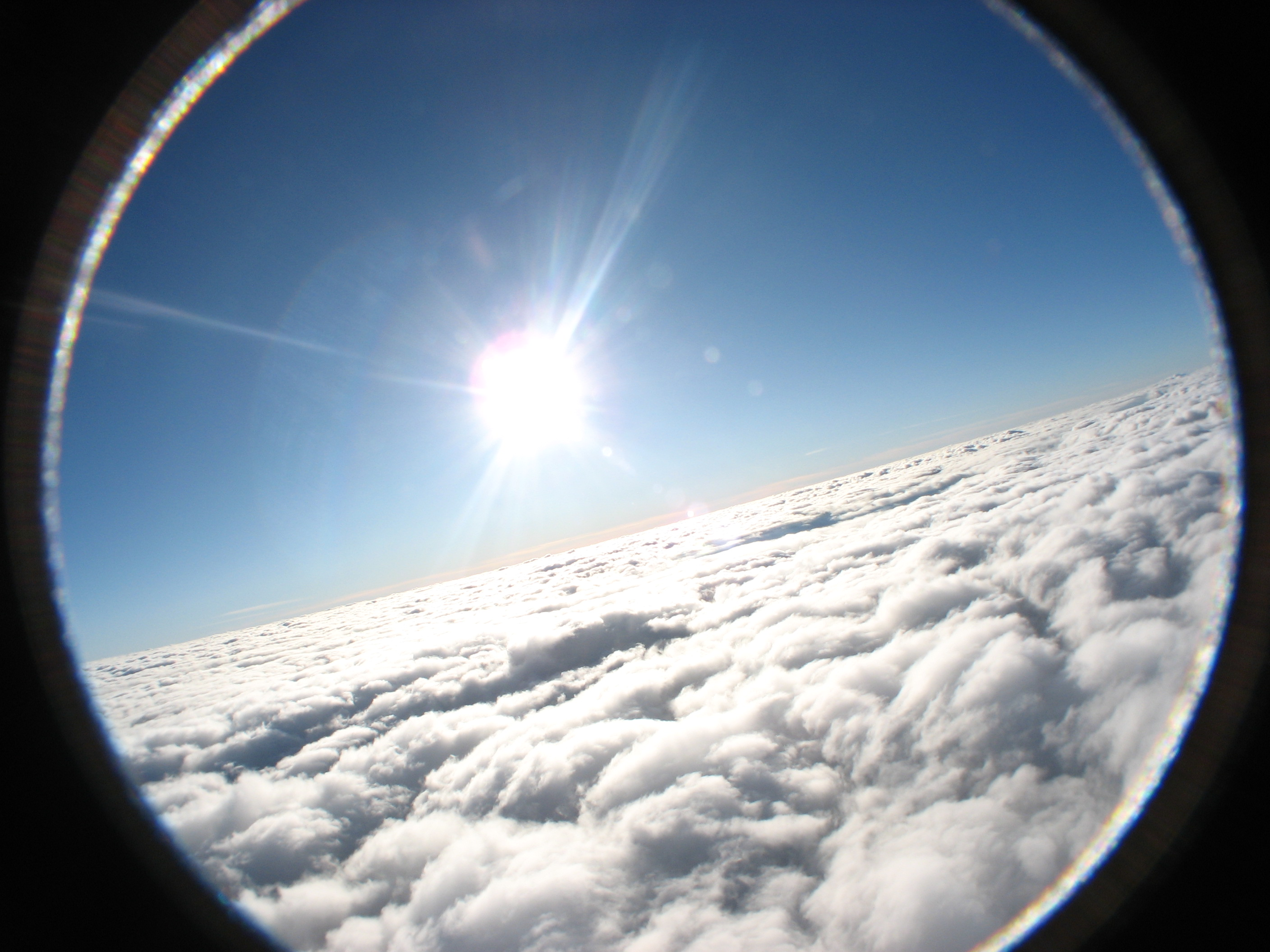
The "Spacebridge" weather balloon probe above clouds, in February 2010

Noisebridge had a near space exploration program in 2010, which launched weather-balloon probes exploring altitudes of nearly 70,000 feet, carrying a variety of smartphones and digital cameras for imaging and altitude sensing using a GPS system. Altitudes reached have exceeded the operational limits of consumer level GPS systems.

== NoiseTor ==
NoiseTor (or Noisebridge Tor Project) was a Noisebridge initiative to create and operate additional Tor relays. The project accepted financial donations to sponsor additional nodes. The project was shut down officially by 2022.

== Awards and honors ==
- Noisebridge won the SF Bay Guardian 2010 Best of the Bay award as "Best Open Source Playground"; the review concluded, "the vibe is welcoming and smart."
- In 2011 the SF Weekly awarded Noisebridge Best of San Francisco as "Best Hacker Playground", describing it as "the ultimate in DIY ethic" and noting its "distinctive sense of humor."

== Controversies ==
As of 2013, many women have reported instances of being sexually harassed and assaulted at Noisebridge. Co-founder Jacob Appelbaum was accused of multiple instances of sexual harassment. In June 2016, amid an uptick in accusations against Appelbaum and statements from various other groups banning him from their spaces, Noisebridge did the same, stating in an official blog post that "Jacob is no longer welcome in our community, either in its physical or online spaces". In their statement, they explained that his alleged actions (as well as those of other Noisebridge participants accused of harassement), although they had occurred before its instating in 2014, were in violation of their Anti-Harassment policy.

== Cultural references ==
The video game Watch Dogs 2 was reportedly influenced by Noisebridge.
