= International Principles on the Application of Human Rights to Communications Surveillance =

The International Principles on the Application of Human Rights to Communications Surveillance (also called the "Necessary and Proportionate Principles" or just "the Principles") is a document officially launched at the UN Human Rights Council in Geneva in September 2013 by the Electronic Frontier Foundation which attempts to "clarify how international human rights law applies in the current digital environment". Communications surveillance (that is to say, mass surveillance of communications) conflicts with a number of international human rights, mainly that of privacy. As a result, communications surveillance may only occur when prescribed by law necessary to achieve legitimate aim, and proportionate to the aim used.

The document consists of 13 principles developed to provide society groups, industry, governments, and others with a framework to assess whether current and proposed surveillance laws or statutes conflict with International Human Rights law.

== History ==
The inception of the principles occurred as a result of a meeting between over 40 experts in privacy and security in Brussels, October 2012. After the initial consultation, a second meeting in Rio de Janeiro took place in December 2012 with the participation of the United Nations Special Rapporteur. Global consultation followed via conference calls every month between January and May 2013. The drafting process, led by Access Now, EFF and Privacy International, along with several NGO's, Criminal Lawyers, Human rights advocates and privacy advocates were finalized and published for the first time on 10 July 2013 online at www.necessaryandproportionate.org.

In September 2013 at the 24th session of the United Nations Human Rights Council in Geneva, they were launched officially.

The principles have now been adopted globally by more than 400 organizations. The global adoption necessitated a number of primarily superficial textual changes in the language of the document for the purposes of translation. This occurred between March and May 2014.

The effect and intention of the principles remained the same, and the final and authoritative version of the document was then launched in May 2014.

== Political Support Prior to the Publication of the Principles ==
The initial release followed a report from the United Nations Special Rapporteur on Freedom of Expression and Opinion in April 2013, which highlights the widespread practice of states surveying communications, stating that such surveillance severely undermines citizens' ability to enjoy a private life, freely express themselves and enjoy their other fundamental human rights.

In July 2013 the United Nations High Commissioner for Human Rights, emphasized the importance of applying human right standards and democratic safeguards to surveillance and law enforcement activities:"While concerns about national security and criminal activity may justify the exceptional and narrowly-tailored use of surveillance programmes, surveillance without adequate safeguards to protect the right to privacy actually risk impacting negatively on the enjoyment of human rights and fundamental freedoms."

== Purpose ==
The purpose of the principles was to provide civil society groups, states, the courts, legislative and regulatory bodies, industry and others with a framework to evaluate whether current or proposed surveillance laws comply with International Human Rights.

The concern was that key protections to privacy had been eroded away with technological advancements, therefore needed robust support in some areas to raise international human rights to the standards which had developed in the pre-digital age.

== The Principles ==
The following is a summary of the document containing the principles. All below is source from the actual document itself, except where noted.

=== Preamble ===
The preamble of the document recognizes that Communications Surveillance interferes with the Right to privacy, therefore can only be used when it is prescribed by law, necessary to achieve a legitimate aim, and proportionate to the aim pursued. The view of the document is that existing human rights law has not kept up with the progression of technology. The preamble states that the threat to these rights combined with the increase in popularity of using communications content and metadata that states are not placing "sufficient restrictions on how they can be subsequently used by States".

=== Scope of Application ===
To get the correct scope and purpose of application for the document, it is required to be read and interpreted as part of a larger framework rather than as individual principles. Application of this document is to apply both within states and extra territorially, regardless of purpose.

It is to apply for protection of the individual from the state, and also states there is an obligation of states to protect individuals from non-state actors.

The document states that unless the principles are applied this way, a State conducting Communications Surveillance may not meet International Human Rights obligations. The principles are stated to "articulate the duties and obligations of States when engaging in Communications Surveillance".

=== Changing Definitions and Technology ===
This section of the document is dedicated to the interpretation of certain terms found throughout the document, and highlighting that some of the legal definitions used may not have effectively kept pace with technological change, and require reiteration. The principles state that the because of the increased ability of communications surveillance, the existing legal framework which currently distinguishes between 'content' and 'non-content' is no longer appropriate, and protection from all types of surveillance should be given a higher legal priority.

=== The Principles ===
==== Legality ====
Any limitation imposed on an International Human Rights must be prescribed by law. Sufficient notice should be given if a proposed law is going to limit one of these rights. The law should be clear, and given periodic review to ensure it remains effective given the speed of technological development.

==== Legitimate Aim ====
Communications surveillance should only be used by permitted state authorities where necessary in a democratic society. Any situation where discrimination arises should not be used.

==== Necessity ====
Surveillance laws should be limited to those which are necessary to achieve a legitimate aim, or where there are multiple means but Communications Surveillance is the least intrusive method on International Human Rights. The onus of establishing necessity should remain with the state

==== Adequacy ====
Any communications surveillance authorized by law must be appropriate for the legitimate aim it is fulfilling.

==== Proportionality ====
Communications Surveillance is regarded as a highly intrusive act, and therefore must consider the sensitivity and severity of the situation. The state should establish the following prior to conducting communications surveillance:

- There is a high chance of serious crime or specific threat
- There is a high degree of probability that relevant evidence will be obtained.
- Other less invasive techniques have been exhausted, such that communications surveillance is the least intrusive method
- Information collected will be confined to only which is relevant
- Excess information obtained will be returned or destroyed
- The information accesses will be used by the specific authority for the purpose the authority was given
- The requested authority to use communications surveillance does not undermine the purpose of the right to privacy or other fundamental freedoms.

==== Competent Judicial Authority ====
The authority determining the validity of the communications surveillance must be independent of those conducting the surveillance, and be competent when making these decisions.

==== Due Process ====
That everyone is entitled to a fair and public hearing within a reasonable time by a competent judicial authority. Due process can be used interchangeably with "procedural fairness" and "natural justice"

==== User Notification ====
Those subjects of Communication Surveillance should be given the opportunity to challenge the decision when a decision authorizing Surveillance has been issued. The materials presented in support of the application should be available for those subjects. Delay in notification is acceptable where notification would frustrate the purpose of communication surveillance and authorization is granted by a competent judicial authority.

==== Transparency ====
Information about use and amount of Communication Surveillance should be available to those who request it. States should provide the requestor with information sufficient to ascertain the nature of the request and determine the size of both the request and those who will be affected by it. Records of requests for communications surveyed should also be published.

==== Public Oversight ====
States should establish an independent position to oversee the use of Communications Surveillance and to ensure transparency and accountability. The person(s) in this position would have sufficient authority to access all potentially relevant information, to assess whether the State is making legitimate use of its lawful capabilities, to evaluate whether the State has met its transparency obligations, and to make public determinations as to the lawfulness of those actions. The document in this instance makes reference to the United Kingdom's Interception of Communications Commissioner as an example of such an independent oversight mechanism.

==== Integrity of communication and systems ====
States should not require those service providers or software/hardware vendors to build surveillance/monitoring capability into their systems. People have a right to express themselves anonymously.

==== Safeguards for International Cooperation ====
Where a state has entered into a mutual legal assistance treaty(MLAT) or other multi-jurisdictional agreement where more than one legal jurisdiction overlaps, the laws that apply are those which have the higher level of protection for the individual. MLAT's should also be transparent, publicly available and subject to guarantees of procedural fairness

==== Safeguards against illegitimate access and right to effective remedy ====
Communications surveillance by third parties should be prohibited with sufficient penalties. Protection for whistle-blowers should be enacted. Any information obtained by means not consistent with these principles should be inadmissible as evidence. Once information collected by communications surveillance has been used for the purpose for which it was collected it should be promptly destroyed or returned.

== Response ==
In October 2013, The Principles were promoted in a brief filed before the President's Review Group on Intelligence and Communications Technologies. They claim that "In a world of ever more complex technology, it is increasingly unclear whether the distinction between "meta-data" and other information carries much weight."

The Center for Democracy and Technology released a report noting overlap between the Principles and a December 9, 2013 proposal by tech groups such as AOL, Apple, Facebook, Google, LinkedIn, Microsoft, Twitter, and Yahoo!.

Now, the principles have over 400 organizations from across the world supporting the principles along with over 40 Experts, Academics and prominent individuals from over 17 countries, and 6 elected officials or political parties from 5 countries.

The principles are now being used as model for reform of surveillance law and insurance policy around the world and to provide a benchmark for measuring whether a State's surveillance practices comply with International Human Rights Law.

Selected signatories of the International Principles on the Application of Human Rights to Communications Surveillance
- Access
- Article 19
- Arab Digital Expression Foundation
- Australian Privacy Foundation
- Association for Progressive Communications
- Bolo Bhi
- Chaos Computer Club
- Centre for Internet and Society (India)
- Center for Technology and Society at Fundação Getulio Vargas
- ContingenteMX
- Digitale Gesellschaft
- Digitalcourage
- Electronic Frontier Foundation
- Human Rights Watch
- International Federation of Library Associations and Institutions
- La Quadrature du Net
- European Digital Rights
- Fundación Vía Libre
- OpenMedia.ca
- Open Rights Group
- PEN International
- Reporters Without Borders
- Canadian Internet Policy and Public Interest Clinic
- SHARE Foundation
- Privacy International
