= Freiheit statt Angst =

Political protest march in Germany

Freiheit statt Angst ('freedom not fear') is a political protest march, repeatedly taking place in Germany since 2006. The main issue is citizens' data privacy. The protests in Berlin in the last years were the largest demonstrations against public surveillance since the boycott of the census in West Germany in the 1980s.

From 2007 to 2011 the event has been organized by the civil rights association Arbeitskreis Vorratsdatenspeicherung (working-group data retention). Its largest protest took place in 2009 with around 25,000 participants.

== History ==
=== 2006 ===
The first protest march called Freiheit statt Angst happened on 20 October 2006 in cooperation with the Big Brother Awards in Bielefeld. The demonstration was formed of approximately 250 people. It has been organized by 9 different organizations, e.g. Chaos Computer Club, Deutsche Vereinigung für Datenschutz (German association for data Privacy), Forum InformatikerInnen für Frieden und gesellschaftliche Verantwortung (forum of computer scientists for peace and social responsibility), FoeBuD (now digitalcourage), Humanistische Union, Netzwerk Neue Medien (network new media) and Stop1984.

A few months prior, the Arbeitskreis Vorratsdatenspeicherung appealed for a demonstration named Freiheit statt Sicherheitswahn ('Freedom not security delusion') which was also followed by about 250 people.

=== 2007 ===
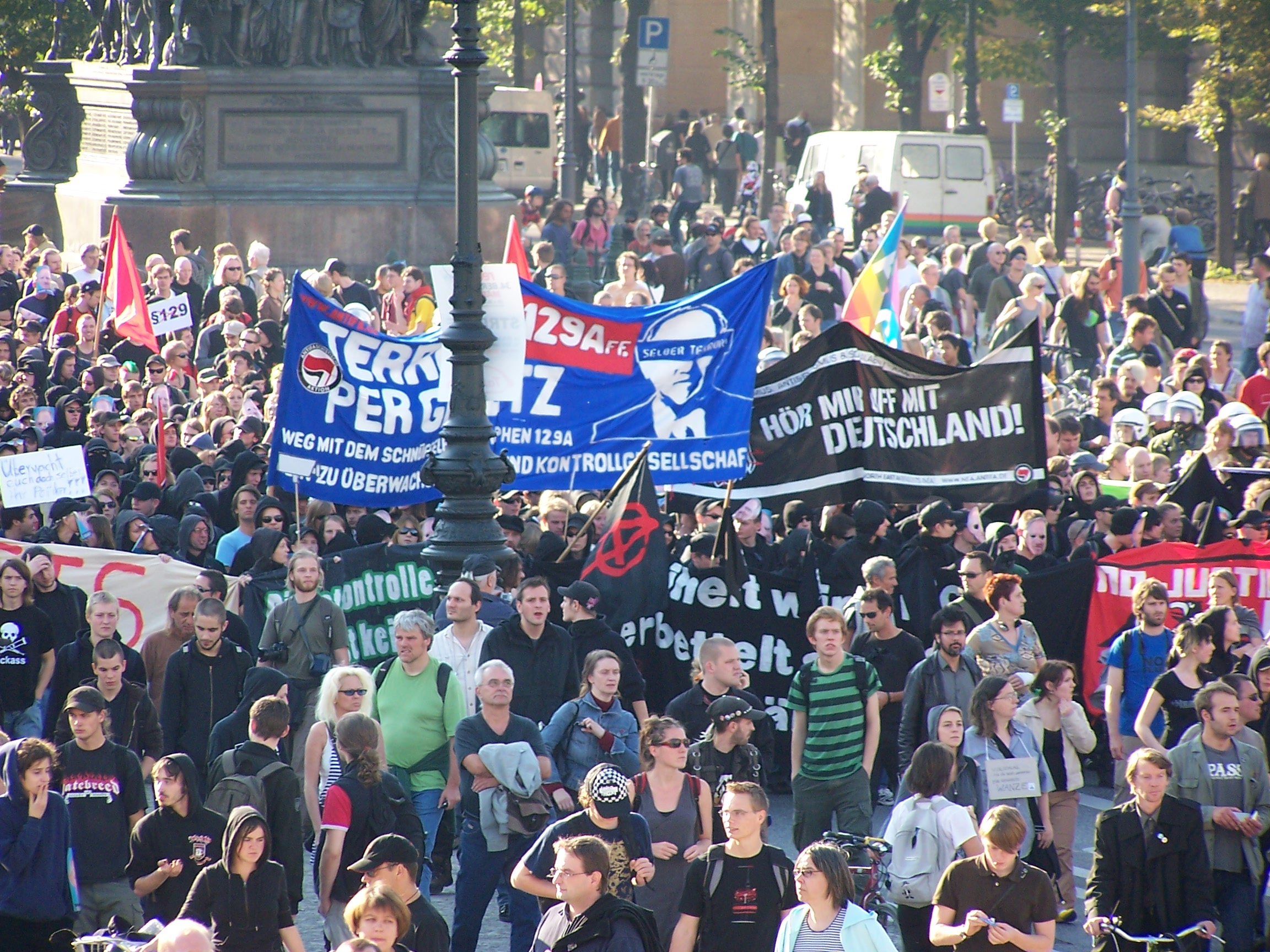
Freiheit statt Angst 2007 in Berlin

On 14 April 2007 a demonstration named Freiheit statt Angst happened to be in Frankfurt, being attended by at least 1000 people.

On 22 September 2007 about 15,000 people attended the bigger demonstration in Berlin. According to the data protection commissioner of Schleswig-Holstein, Thilo Weichert those where the largest protests for data protection in the past 20 years. Fifty organisations appealed for the demonstration. Amongst others the Hedonist International and Freie Ärzteschaft (free doctors association) attended with their trucks.

=== 2018 ===
On Saturday, October 13, 2018 there were protests in the streets of Berlin for the data security of German citizens. The protesters' demands included:

1. Stopping monitoring
2. Stop data retention
3. No State Hacking - Stop State Trojans
4. Protect the presumption of innocence and the rule of law
