= Convention on Cybercrime =

Convention on Cybercrime may refer to:

- Budapest Convention on Cybercrime, a 2001 Council of Europe treaty
- United Nations Convention against Cybercrime, a 2024 United Nations treaty
