= Electronic Frontier Finland =

Finnish online civil rights organization

- Founded: 2001
- Type: civil rights organization
- Location: Helsinki, Finland
- Members: about 1,600 (2014)
- Website: effi.org

Electronic Frontier Finland – Effi ry (Effi) is a Finnish on-line civil rights organization founded in 2001 by Herkko Hietanen, Ville Oksanen and Mikko Välimäki. It had about 1,600 members at the end of 2014. While not formally affiliated with the U.S.-based Electronic Frontier Foundation, the two organizations share many of their goals. Effi is a member of the Global Internet Liberty Campaign and a founding member of European Digital Rights (EDRi).

Effi's stated aim is to protect and promote freedom of speech and privacy on the Internet as well as in Finnish society in general. Among other things, Effi has lobbied for effective anti-spam legislation and against software patents. Effi has also assumed a leading role on certain consumer rights issues such as CD copy protection, in part due to the reluctance of traditional Finnish consumer protection agencies to address them.

Effi presents the annual Finnish Big Brother Awards in cooperation with Privacy International.

Board members include Tapani Tarvainen, Timo Karjalainen and Leena Romppainen as chairperson.
