= Big Brother Awards (Finland) =

The Big Brother Award in Finland (Finnish: Isoveli-palkinto) is a critical prize awarded to individuals and organizations violating privacy and promoting a surveillance society. It is awarded by Electronic Frontier Finland. It is the Finnish version of the international Privacy International's Big Brother Awards. In year 2008 there were awards in three categories: personal, the government and private sector organization.

In Finland, together with Big Brother Awards, there is also a positive nomination that is named after Winston Smith from George Orwell's book Nineteen Eighty-Four. This award is given to a person who or an organization which has advanced privacy protection and democracy most during the year.

== Award recipients ==
Big Brother Awards in Finland have been recognized in years 2002, 2003, 2005, 2007, 2008, 2010, 2011, 2013 and 2015.

In 2008, Electronic Frontier Finland awarded the Big Brother Award to the Ministry of Justice for its electronic voting trial.
