= Adessium Foundation =

Charitable foundation based in the Netherlands

The Adessium Foundation is a charitable foundation based in the Netherlands.

It was created in 2005 by Gerard van Vliet and his family.

== Budget and beneficiaries ==
Its annual budget is between fifteen and twenty million euros. This is distributed to programs “such as marine conservation and efforts to promote open and democratic societies”. According to Politico, the foundation is a major donor to some of Brussels' most influential NGOs. In 2015 the foundation paid around €18.5 million to organizations such as The European Consumer Organisation, ClientEarth, Corporate Europe Observatory, Finance Watch, Friends of the Earth Europe, Transparency International, Greenpeace, and Zero Waste Europe.

== Projects supported by the foundation ==
- Rewilding Europe
- Arena for Journalism in Europe.
- European Digital Rights
- Global Ocean Commission
- Privacy International

== Projects formerly supported by the foundation ==
- Bellingcat.
- Digital Freedom Foundation (with the Ford Foundation, and the Open Society Foundations).
- European Policy Center.
- Finance Watch.
- African Parks.
- United By Tax.
