= Quintessenz =

Austrian civil liberties advocacy organization

Quintessenz (German for "quintessence") is a civil liberties advocacy organization based in the Museumsquartier in Vienna, Austria.

Founded in 1994, Quintessenz works on Internet and on-line liberty issues in co-operation with other civil liberties advocates around the world.

In 1999 Erich Moechel represented Quintessenz as a speaker at the Computers, Freedom and Privacy 99 Conference in Washington DC.

Quintessenz is a co-organizer of the Austrian version of the Big Brother Awards and a member of European Digital Rights.
