= 2015 United States–China Cybersecurity Agreement =

Executive agreement between US and People's Republic of China

The 2015 United States-China Cybersecurity agreement is an Executive agreement between the United States and the People's Republic of China. The agreement covers several areas of Cybersecurity policy, including on information sharing mechanisms and establishing that neither country will support cyber-enabled Intellectual property theft. The agreement was announced at a joint press conference attended by U.S. President Barack Obama and Chinese General Secretary Xi Jinping located at the White House.

The agreement has been called ineffective by the Trump administration and others.

== See also ==
- Budapest Convention on Cybercrime
