= Computers, Freedom and Privacy Conference =

The Computers, Freedom and Privacy Conference (or CFP, or the Conference on Computers, Freedom and Privacy) is an annual academic conference held in the United States or Canada about the intersection of computer technology, freedom, and privacy issues. The conference was first held in 1991 in Burlingame, California. Since at least 1999, it has been organized under the aegis of the Association for Computing Machinery. It was originally sponsored by CPSR.

Attendees include high-level government officials, grassroots advocates, and programmers.

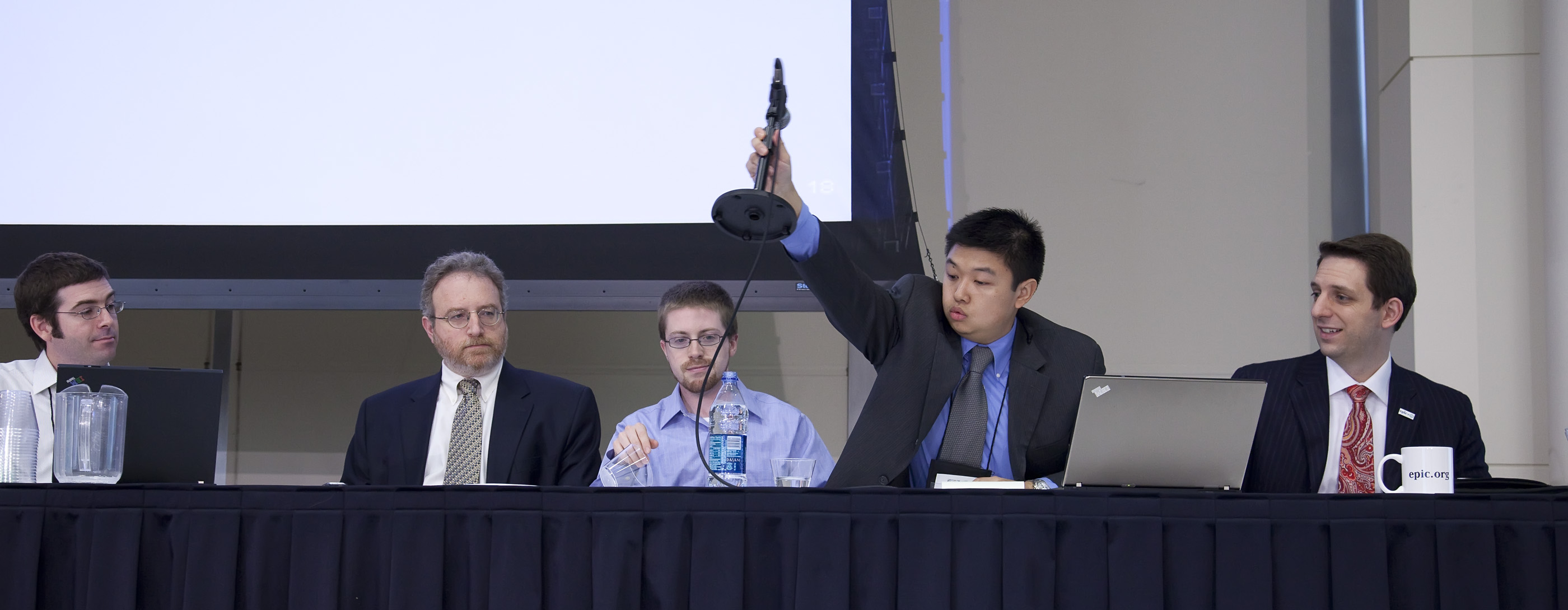
Panelists at the 2009 CFP

The first annual US Big Brother Awards were made at CFP99 on Wednesday 7 April 1999, the 50th anniversary of the publication of George Orwell's Nineteen Eighty-Four. The awards were made by the London-based Privacy International to recognize "the government and private sector organizations which have done the most to invade personal privacy in the United States." Simon Davies, managing director of Privacy International, presented the awards, otherwise known as Orwells. There were five categories of award: Greatest Corporate Invader, Lifetime Menace, Most Invasive Program, People's Choice, and Worst Public Official.
