= ZaMirNET =

ZaMirNET (ForPeaceNET) is a Croatia-based non-governmental organisation working in the field of ICT (information and communication technology).

== Roots ==
AdvocacyNet.org describes its formation during the turmoil in the former Yugoslavia. It says, "Electronic information became an instrument of war and peace during the collapse of Yugoslavia." Amidst the "worst crimes committed in Europe this century" the first major experiment in email was launched in June 1992 in Zagreb and Belgrade, almost exactly a year after Croatia seceded from Yugoslavia, triggering a brutal response from Serbia.

This venture got the support of the George Soros-funded Open Society Institute, and US peace activist Eric Bachman, living in Europe since 1969, together with the Dutch peace activist Wam Kat (who wrote his daily "Zagreb Dairy" on Zamir), set up an electronic network between peace groups in the region. Eric Bachman enlisted the help of FoeBuD (now digitalcourage), an organisation promoting digital communications and privacy and based in Bielefeld, Germany. In the early years, bulletin board systems in London, Austria and Bielefeld provided the shortest routes for electronic messages across the borders of the emerging Balkan states. The network was named ZaMir ("For Peace") Transnational Net.

A research work titled Documenting the impact of the community peacebuilding practices in the post-Yugoslav region as a basis for policy framework development conducted by Marina Škrabalo, an activist of the Centre for Peace Studies, Croatia, provides some details.

It says: "(The) initial steps to enable communication among emerging peace groups separated by the lines of conflict took place in October 1991, when an improvised fax relay system was set up, with the help of international solidarity organizations such as War Resisters International (WRI) and the International Fellowship of Reconciliation (IFOR) that acted as intermediaries and dispatchers of messages. A turning point was early 1992 when the Communications Aid project for the people in former Yugoslavia was launched by foreign peace groups together with the Center for the Culture of Peace and Nonviolence in Ljubljana, the Anti-War Campaign of Zagreb and the Center for Anti-war Action in Belgrade, with the objective of setting up an alternative electronic mail system (bulletin board system or BBS) that could work on poor quality telephone lines and simple computers, the only available ICT resources at that time in the war-stricken post-Yugoslav region.

== "Trust link" ==
According to a report by FoeBuD, "The Communications Aid is not only for an exchange of letters, messages, news and ideas among the peace groups, but it is helping people from both sides of the conflict begin to communicate again with each other. (This idea was first expressed in a proposal of the International Physicians for the Prevention of Nuclear War (IPPNW) in the former Yugoslavia for a "trust link" between the conflicting sides.) It is being enlarged to enable humanitarian aid groups, NGOs (non-governmental organisations), educational institutions and others to use the network. Additionally it can, for example, provided the basis of a communication network to help refugees and displaced persons to find each other."

Marina Škrabalo's research says: "In February/March 1994, ZaMir servers were installed in Ljubljana and besieged Sarajevo, followed by the set up of the Priština server ZANA, administered by the independent newspaper Koha in October 1994. The network was considerably improved in spring 1995, when the Zagreb, Sarajevo and Belgrade servers were enlarged and a new server, with direct international telephone access was installed in Tuzla".

The impact of ZTN on the development and sustainability of the post-Yugoslav peace movement during the most intense war period from 1992 until the signing of Dayton Agreement in November 1995 is considered by some to be significant.

== Peace, human rights activists and journalists ==
This network connected and provided training and technical support to more than 1700 peace, human rights and humanitarian workers and independent journalists from all the countries in war, including dozens of local and international NGOs that used this communication channel to assist in the search for the missing persons and tracing relatives stuck in war zones, plan joint peace-building projects, political campaigns and send out independent news reports and access more than 150 regional and international news conferences.

Two international volunteers, Kathryn Turnipseed and Cecilia Hansen, under a project name "Electronic Witches", created the first ZTN training manual for women-users ensuring that gender specific barriers to use of ICT would be overcome in the trainings they delivered to hundreds of women activists throughout Croatia, Serbia and Bosnia and Herzegovina.

As the intense war period in Bosnia and Herzegovina and Croatia passed, the telephone lines and direct Internet access became more viable, ZTN did not manage to achieve its goal of adjusting its system to more advanced technology, due to lack of resources and weariness of the core groups of volunteers who kept it going during the difficult war years.

Several web-based networking and media outlets have in the meantime emerged in the post-Yugoslav region—such as Ljudmila, Kontrapunkt Festival, out of which ZaMirNET in Zagreb has built on—in terms of values, activist networks and human resources of ZTN.

== Current operations ==
ZaMirNet has an office in Zagreb, Croatia with a staff of around six. Until 2004, ZaMirNet had several local offices in war affected areas of Croatia.

Current program areas include:

- Strategic use of ICTs
- Education
- Networking
- Independent media initiatives

It is a member of the Association for Progressive Communications, and sees itself as being "dedicated to the promotion of civil society and its values through ICT and the development of new media initiatives".

Recently (2004), it was involved with a media-project called ZaMirZINE—an electronic news magazine specialising in themes related to civil society. This interactive e-journal, was aimed at serving as a media outlet for a situation of otherwise scarce news on youth, peace-building, women's rights, gay and lesbian issues, environment and independent cultural initiatives. It combined articles with columns on national, regional and international events of relevance to human rights, social and economic justice and peace. ZaMirZINE is based on cooperation and knowledge-transfer between activists, young journalists and established journalists. ZaMirZINE was voted the best Croatian electronic zine of the year 2004 by the PC Chip, a magazine focused on ICT.

Through its MEDIAnet project, launched in 2004 too, ZaMirNET says it aims to encourage and facilitate the establishment of locally based independent media in Croatia and the neighbouring countries—Bosnia and Herzegovina, Serbia and Montenegro. NGOs, through this project, are supported to expand their outreach and communication strategies to the media—including via community-based, alternative, and internet-based media outlets.

ZaMirNET says its research indicates that the mainstream media "tend to represent civil society organisations with a sensationalist and sometimes biased perspectives". On the other hand, it also notes that NGO members tend to lack journalistic skills to systematically report news about their sector "in a professional way".

ZaMirNET believes its ZaMirZINE could offer an inclusive media environment, based on a "knowledge transfer between activists, young journalists and established journalists".

== ZaMirNET team ==
Last ZaMirNET's governing board was composed of Vatroslav Zovko, Srđan Dvornik, Davor Gjenero, Predrag Bejaković, and Nebojša Gavrilov.

Due to the lack of funding ZaMirNET ceased its operations in 2016.
