= Global Ocean Commission =

International organization

The Global Ocean Commission
- Founded: February 2013
- Dissolved: 2016
- Type: International organization
- Region served: Worldwide
- Key people: David Miliband; Jose Maria Figueres; Trevor Manuel
- Website: www.globaloceancommission.org

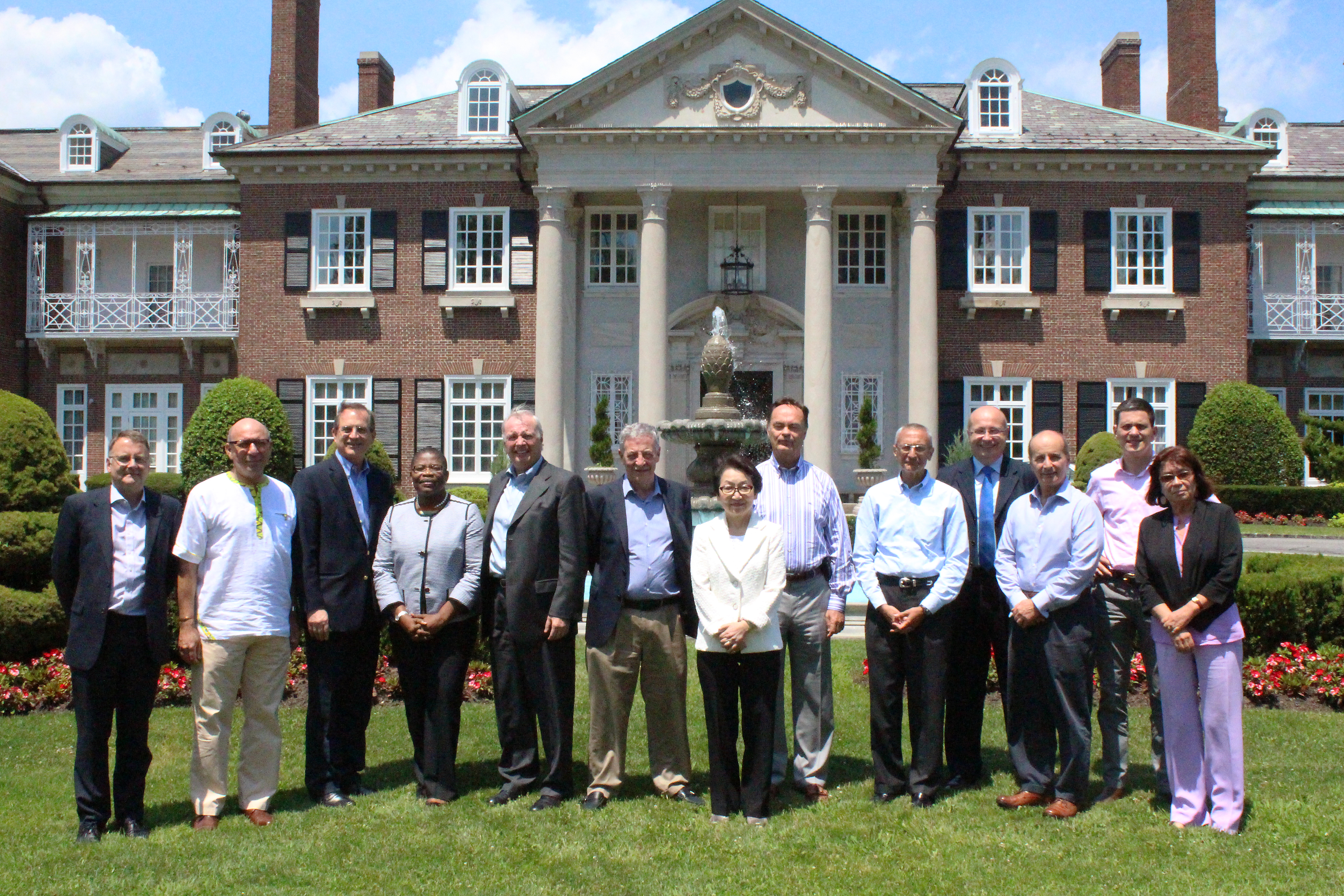
Global Ocean Commission meeting New York, July 2013

The Global Ocean Commission was an international initiative between 2013 and 2016 to raise awareness, and promote action to address, the degradation of the ocean and help restore it to full health and productivity. Its focus was on the high seas, the vast ocean areas that lie beyond the Exclusive Economic Zones of individual states. The Commission originated as an initiative of the Pew Charitable Trust, in partnership with Somerville College at the University of Oxford It launched in February 2013 and delivered its final report in February 2016. The Commission included senior political figures, business leaders and development specialists, and consulted and collaborated widely with a diverse group of constituencies, including ocean users, governments, scientists, economists, business leaders and trade unions.

The Commission published its principal report and recommendations, "From Decline to Recovery: a Rescue Package for the Ocean", in June 2014, and released a follow-up report, "The Future of Our Ocean: Next Steps and Priorities", in February 2016.

== Background ==
The Global Ocean Commission was launched in 2013 in response to concerns that, when it comes to the global ocean: "Governance is woefully inadequate, and on the high seas, anarchy rules the waves." In their founding message, the co-Chairs stated that the Commission is "inspired by the opportunity that exists for the high seas to play a regenerative role in restoring whole ocean health, and by the potential of a small number of bold proposals to stimulate a cycle of recovery." The high seas constitute 45% of the Earth’s surface and are essential to the health of the planet.

Five key "drivers of ocean decline" were identified by the Commission: rising demand for resources; technological advances; decline of fish stocks; climate change (including ocean acidification), biodiversity and habitat loss; weak high seas governance.

The mandate of the Global Ocean Commission was to address these issues by formulating "politically and technically feasible short-, medium- and long-term recommendations."

The Commission originated as an initiative of the Pew Charitable Trust, in partnership with Somerville College at the University of Oxford, Adessium Foundation and Oceans 5. The Commission was supported by the Adessium Foundation, Oceans 5, and Pew Charitable Trusts, but was an independent entity.

== Commissioners ==
=== Co-chairs ===
- José María Figueres (Co-chair) – President of Costa Rica (1994-1998)
- Trevor Manuel (Co-chair) – South Africa Minister of Finance (1996-2009)
- David Miliband (Co-chair) – President and CEO of the International Rescue Committee and former UK Foreign Secretary

=== Commissioners ===
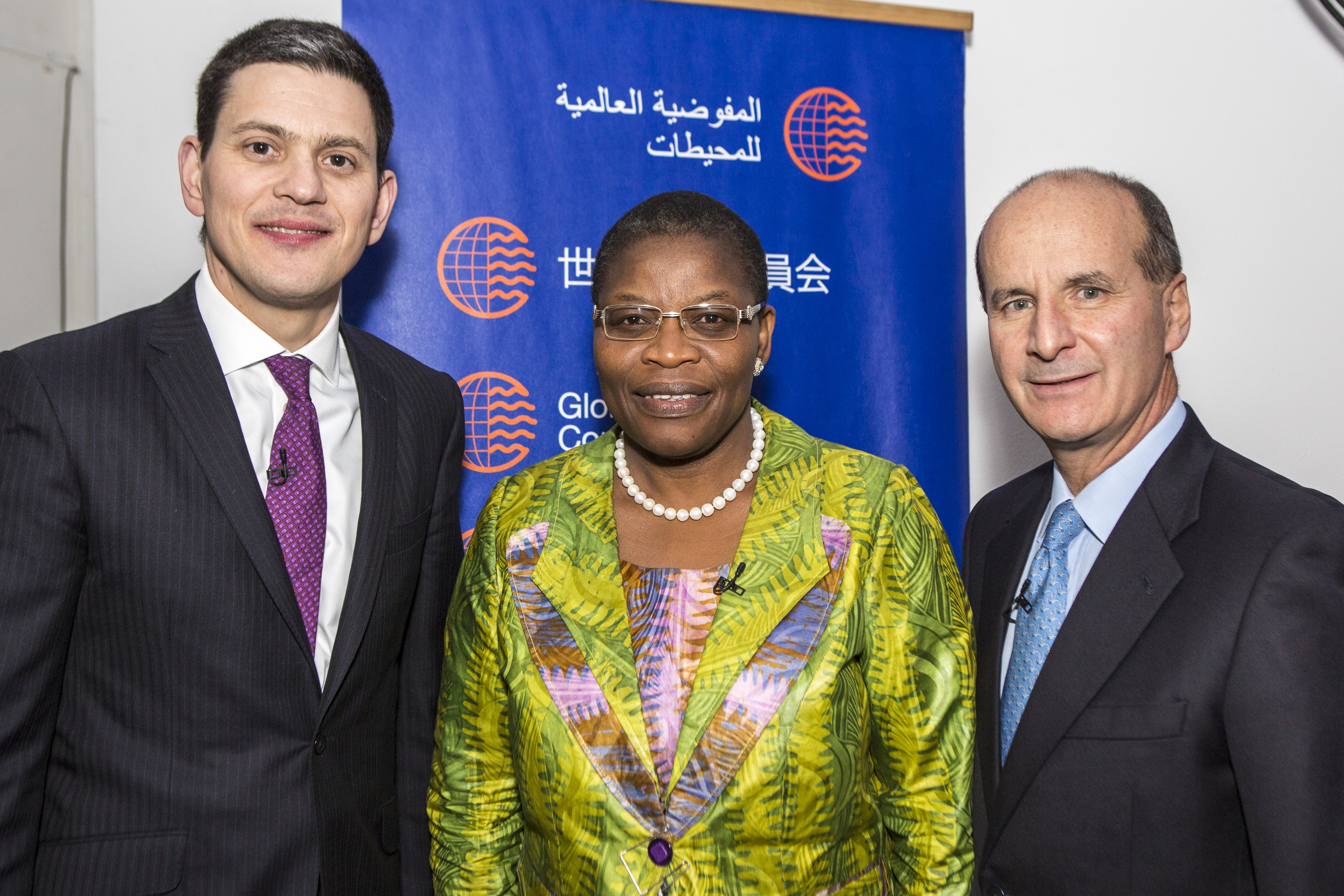
Global Ocean Commissioners at launch 2013. From left: David Miliband, Obiageli 'Oby' Ezekwesili, Jose Maria Figueres

- Obiageli ‘Oby’ Ezekwesili – Vice President of the World Bank for Africa (2007-2012)
- Vladimir Golitsyn – President of the Seabed Disputes Chamber of the International Tribunal for the Law of the Sea
- Robert Hill – Member of the Australian Senate (1981-2006)
- Yoriko Kawaguchi – Member of the House of Councillors of Japan
- Pascal Lamy – Director-General of the World Trade Organization (2005-2013)
- Paul Martin – Prime Minister of Canada (2003-2006)
- Sri Mulyani Indrawati – Managing Director of the World Bank Group
- Cristina Narbona – Environment Minister of Spain (2004-2008)
- Ratan Tata – Chairman of the Tata Group (1991-2012)
- Foua Toloa – Elected Member of the Council for the Ongoing Government for Fakaofo, Tokelau (Deceased, June 2015)
- Andrés Velasco – Minister of Finance of Chile (2006-2010)
- Luiz Furlan - Co-chairman of the board of BRF Brazil foods from 2009-2011
- John Podesta - Chair of the Center for American Progress (2003–present), Commissioner in 2013
- Victor Chu - Chairman of the First Eastern Investment Group, Director and Council member of the Hong Kong stock exchange, Chair of the Hong Kong - Europe Business Council
- Carol Browner - Head of the U.S. Environmental Protection Agency (1993-2001)

The Commissioners were supported by an International Secretariat consisting of:

- Simon Reddy, Executive Secretary
- Rémi Parmentier, Deputy Executive Secretary
- Clare Brennan, Director of Operations
- Kristian Teleki, Director of Global Engagement
- Justin Woolford, Director of Communications
- Inés de Agueda, Communications and Policy Officer

== Recommendations ==
The Global Ocean Commission’s 2014 report outlined a set of practical proposals to address the five drivers of decline, reverse high seas degradation, and improve the system of governance, monitoring and compliance.

The Eight Proposals are:

1. A Sustainable Development Goal for the Ocean
2. Governing the High Seas - Promoting care and recovery
3. No More Overfishing - Ending harmful high seas subsidies
4. Illegal, Unreported and Unregulated Fishing - Closing seas, ports and markets.
5. Plastics - Keeping them out of the ocean
6. Offshore Oil and Gas - Establishing binding safety standards and liability
7. Global Ocean Accountability Board - Monitoring progress towards a healthy ocean
8. Creating a High Seas Regeneration Zone.

== Threats facing the high seas ==
According to research examined by the Global Ocean Commission:

- Approximately half of the world’s fish stocks are fished to their maximum sustainable level, while a further third are fished beyond that level, some to commercial extinction.
- Overfishing costs the global economy an estimated $50bn per year and threatens food security.
- Climate change is forcing the migration of some marine life away from their natural grounds, and appears to be reducing the amount of living space for some important fish species.
- Illegal, unreported and unregulated (IUU) fishing fleets are implicated in acts of terrorism and trafficking of people (including children), drugs and weapons, with working conditions which can amount to forced labour. The Commission called for all fishing vessels operating on the high seas to be fitted with mandatory vessel IDs in order to allow for monitoring.
