= Wam Kat =

Dutch political activist and author

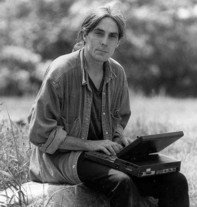
Wam Kat with Laptop 2001.

Pieter Jan Herman Fredrik "Wam" Kat (born 23. November 1956, Zeist) is a Dutch political activist and author who now lives in Germany and serves in the city government of Belzig.

== Biography ==
As child Wam was a longtime member of the Boy Scouts and founded the local branch of the World Wildlife Rangers, the youth organization of World Wide Fund for Nature.

Wam was told by a doctor when he was 18 that he had a year to live and made a conscious choice to live a whole life in a single year; when he did not die, he did not slow down. During his youth and study period he co-founded different organizations and action groups at a national level for child and youth rights (e.g. Komitee Kindervuist). He was Chairman of the Pacifist Socialist Youth Organization and Dutch Youth Representative to UNESCO in the late 1970s. He was also longtime co-publisher from the first Dutch New Age magazine "Waterman".

Wam was also one of the founders of the Dutch mobile vegetarian kitchen, "Rampenplan" which supports political activists at extended actions by providing food and other services (since 1981).

In 1982 Wam appeared in a Dutch documentary by Hans Fels named: Donkere wolken boven het paradijs: Het offer (Dark clouds over paradise: The sacrifice), telling the story about how he intended to sacrifice himself in protest of the nuclear power plants, by setting himself on fire in the centre of Amsterdam, but got distracted.

Wam took over the European youth environmental network EYFA (European Youth For(est) Action) from YEE Youth and Environment Europe in 1986 organized to address the effect of acid rain on the regional forests. Wam was instrumental in the rapid growth of the organization and was the principal organizer of the summer festival/university called Ecotopia which was first held in Cologne, Germany in 1989 and moved every subsequent year to a different country. Wam also developed the "Eco Rate" system which EYFA and other progressive organizations used to equalize access to events and goods. The Eco rates used a non-market currency conversation system, so that participants from poorer countries would have more favorable rates of exchange than participants from rich countries.

Wam is best known for his work during the Yugoslav Wars, co-founder of Za Mir Network (For Peace) and the "Zagreb Diaries" which he penned at the time, initially as the equivalent of a blog, but ultimately they came out in book form and were translated into several languages. Wam was also co-founder and instrumental in securing funding for the Suncokret Centar (Sunflower) a voluntary humanitarian and social organization during and after the Bosnian war, which had almost 8000 volunteers from all over the world, one of the largest non-governmental efforts to deal with the influx of refugees from the war and was responsible for the free-time activities, schools and social programs in up to 36 refugee camps in Croatia and Bosnia.

In 1993 Kat's work in Croatia and his Zagreb Diary were mentioned, and Kat quoted in an article in The Nation, the oldest continuously published weekly magazine in the United States, about the internet and its future. This July 1993 piece, The Whole World is Talking, was the Nation's first article about the internet.

Wam later went on to found the Pakrac reconstruction project in the western parts of Slavonia, a region in Croatia. This project used local people from both sides of the regional conflict and international volunteers to rebuild housing which had been destroyed.

After leaving Croatia, Wam moved end 1995 to ZEGG intentional community outside of Berlin in Belzig in the Fläming region where he lived and worked for a number of years. In Belzig he started the so-called "Info-Cafe Der Winkel" (a center for Tolerance and better understanding of different Cultures), which became known as one of Germans best examples of local actions against right-wing violence. Between 1999 and 2001 he shortly moved back to the Balkan, there he was co-founder of Balkan Sunflowers, which still works in Albania, Kosovo and the Republic of Macedonia.

In July 2008, he published a political cookbook in Germany, called "24 Rezepte zur kulinarischen Weltverbesserung" which is roughly translated to "24 recipes for culinary world improvement."

Wam has been arrested for crimes of conscience in multiple countries.

Currently Wam is also serving in the left-wing party Die Linke in the local towncouncil of Belzig.

== Family ==
Wam Kat is son of Frits Kat, sculptor, and stepson of Pieke Dassen, actor and painter.

Kat was married to Ulla Traedmark Jensen and had two children with her, Rik and Pjort, living in Denmark. His older daughter Tyche is from a previous relationship.
