= European Youth For Action =

European Youth For Action (EYFA) is an environmental youth network in Europe. It is based in Amsterdam and has partner organizations in 18 European countries.

== History ==
EYFA started in 1985 as the European Youth Forest Action; a campaign organised by Youth and Environment Europe with then still an office in Denmark. YEE employed the German Petra Keppler for a while as she held office in Amsterdam. After the first bustour Amsterdam-Budapest EYFA was split off to an independent youth organisation and moved to Sittard. The fundraising for Budapest was done by the Dutch Ed Romeijn as the (East-West) exchange-officer of YEE. The then Belgian chairwoman of YEE Adelheid Byttebier is nowadays elderman in Brussels for the Greens.

EYFA grew from a tour that was initiated by Swedish/German/Dutch group in 1986 to save the old forests in Europe, and it was then named European Youth Forest Action. From this beginning, it developed into a platform for grassroots, collectives, organizations, projects and individuals active on environmental and social justice issues all around Europe. One of EYFA's founders was Dutch activist Wam Kat. By 1994, the group had grown to over 400 affiliates across Europe. Its early goal was "to promote co-operation and co-ordination of youth environmentalists on an international level; to integrate issues of environment and development on a global level".

== Structure ==
The group was organized as a "loose network" of youth action groups without "formal membership or membership fees" and "very basic nonbureaucratic structures". EYFA's environmentalist perspective is characterized by a grassroots orientation and by its view that most environmental problems are also a question of social and economic injustice. EYFA works to challenge the mainstream economic system and promotes what it sees as socially and environmentally sound ways of living.

== Ecotopia gathering ==
EYFA has organized the annual Ecotopia gathering, which is training camp of environmental and political organizers from across Europe. The first Ecotopia was in Cologne, Germany in 1989. Ecotopia moved each year, trying to take place in countries where the ecological movement would benefit from having such an event. Thus, it was often the case that Ecotopia was in central or east European countries or the poorer western ones. Ecotopia stopped happening as a regular annual event in the early 2000s.

== Governmental ties ==
EYFA receives funding from various organizations including the European Union to organize its projects and events. The United Nations Department of Economic and Social Affairs has described EYFA as a "major group".

== Campaigns ==
=== Opposition to the "car culture" ===
EYFA opposes the car culture and proposes alternatives to reliance on cars for transportation. It publishes "energetic, information-packed" publications about the car-free movement. The group organized anti-car demonstrations in Lyon, France in 1997, that involved protesters and passersby "dancing in the street" to demand that car use be brought under control.

=== Alternative currency ===
EYFA developed the Ecorates system as an alternative currency system which promotes economic fairness over the European national borders. The group says that EcoRates are not based on simple currency exchange rates, but rather on a hypothetical basket of goods, designed to permit people from less affluent eastern European countries to participate at events in the west.

=== Opposition to nuclear power ===
EYFA participated in peaceful anti-nuclear power demonstrations in Turkey in 2008, and 32 protesters from several different countries were arrested in the northern Turkish province of Sinop.

=== Opposition to coal-fired power plants ===
In 2009, EYFA collaborated with Earth First! and Friends of the Earth to run a training camp near the Belgian-Dutch border to teach organizers how to blockade coal-fired power plants, which the groups called the "cause of the climate crisis".
