= DFRI =

The Digital Freedom and Rights Association
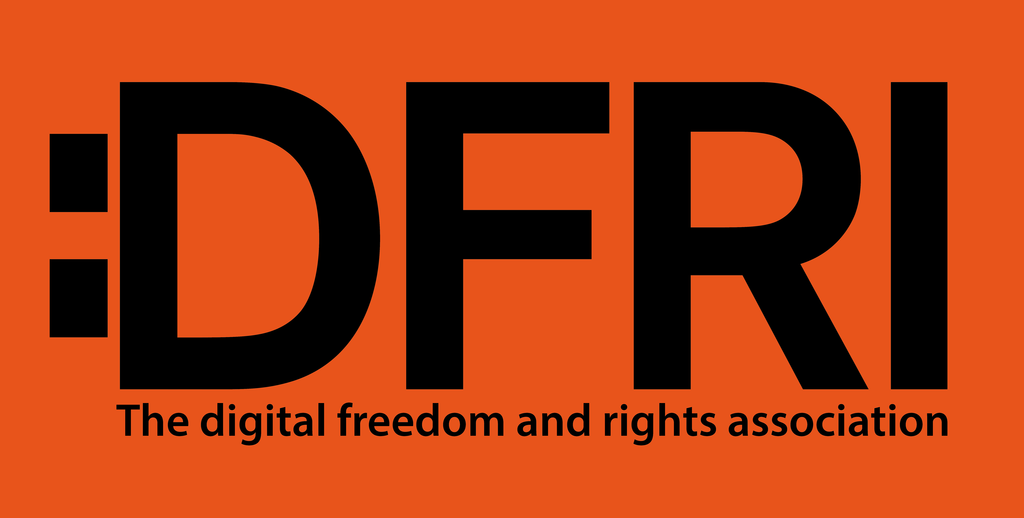
- Founded: 2011
- Type: Nonprofit organization
- Purpose: Digital rights
- Location: Stockholm
- Members: Circa 70
- Website: www.dfri.se

The Digital Freedom and Rights Association (DFRI, Swedish: Föreningen för digitala fri- och rättigheter) is a Swedish non-profit digital rights organisation with circa 70 members. DFRI is a member of European Digital Rights (EDRi). The organisation believes in "freedom of speech, transparency and freedom of information, personal integrity and the individuals' rights to control the use of their personal information and digital footprints". It operates eight Tor exit relays in Sweden. DFRI has also taken a stand against video surveillance. In March 2016, DFRI members showed up at an event for the CCTV business organisation, filming (or possibly pretending to film) the visitors of the event. The DFRI members were later asked to leave the hotel where the event was taking place, because the guests did not feel "safe" while being filmed.

== See also ==
- Electronic Frontier Foundation
