= Stop1984 =

The founder of Stop1984 started the project in 2001 as NGO which is documented in the community of Heise.de (German link). The project was discontinued in early 2008.

- Computer scientists disbelieve in lawfulness of the German decree of telecommunication control (German link)

== Objectives of Stop1984 ==
Stop1984 mostly tries to alert people with its website on:

- the value of the own privacy
- the value of the own data
- the risks of data abuse
- the consequences of the loss of privacy
- the political, social and individual consequences of increasing surveillance
- the dangers of political disinterest

The political objectives are:

- publishing formerly unpublished numbers regarding the success oder failure of surveillance
- that data privacy and the right of informational self-determination find a place in the Basic Constitutional Law in Germany and in European Law

Of course, this objectives can only be achieved by interested and committed people.

== Supporters of Stop1984 ==
Supporter of Stop1984 are:

- Richard Stallman
- Brad Templeton
- Jacob Levich
- Wolf-Dieter Roth
- German Union for Privacy (http://www.datenschutzverein.de/ Website, German link)

== Activities of Stop1984 ==
Every month Stop1984 published a magazine in German that could be downloaded, "Lasst mich in Ruhe" (Don't bother me). The satirical story about the German state with the title "Henry läuft" (Henry runs) (archived version) was published there as well. Stop1984 also signed a statement (archived) of Privacy International. Every day, Stop1984 sent a German summary of news regarding privacy, data privacy, press freedom and similar via email to its subscribers.

== See also ==
- TCPA
- Chaos Computer Club
- ACLU
