= Statewatch =

UK nonprofit organization

- Formation: 1991
- Founder: Tony Bunyan
- Headquarters: London, United Kingdom
- Director: Alamara Khwaja Bettum
- Website: statewatch.org

Statewatch is a UK-based charity founded in 1991 that produces and promotes critical research, policy analysis and investigative journalism to inform debates, movements and campaigns on civil liberties, human rights and democratic standards. Its work primarily focuses on Europe, and in particular the institutions and agencies of the European Union, but it also engages with issues at the national level in the UK and member states and with organisations elsewhere in the world.

== Mission and objectives ==
According to their strategic plan, Statewatch's vision is: “An open Europe of democracy, civil liberties, personal and political rights, free movement, freedom of information, equality and diversity.”

As of 2022, its mission is: “To monitor, analyse and expose state activity that threatens civil liberties, human rights and democratic standards in order to inform and enable a culture of diversity, debate and dissent.”

To achieve this, Statewatch produces news, analyses and in-depth publications covering a range of topics related to state activity across Europe and the UK. These include topics such as policing; surveillance and security technologies; counter-terrorism; asylum and immigration; criminal law; racism and discrimination; and secrecy, transparency, and freedom of information. It is well known for publishing official documents from EU institutions, in particular the Council of the EU, and publishes more than a hundred such documents each year.

Statewatch has filed several successful complaints with the European Ombudsman on issues concerning secrecy, transparency and openness in EU institutions and agencies. The organisation regularly publishes new material on its website and produces a bi-weekly email newsletter.

== History ==
Statewatch was officially founded in 1991 as the operating arm of the Libertarian Research & Education Trust (Charity number: 1154784), which was initially set up in 1982. This built on the work of “State Research” (1977-1982), which produced a bi-monthly bulletin and carried out research on issues concerning state power and civil liberties in the UK.

=== 1990s ===
Statewatch began operating in 1991, following an initiative by the founder and subsequent director, Tony Bunyan, and a group of other individuals from across Europe who perceived a need to produce research, reporting and analysis on civil liberties issues in the context of the new EU laws, policies and institutions that would be introduced by the Treaty of Maastricht.

The original output of this initiative was the Statewatch Bulletin, which was initially published in print six times per year, with articles written by Statewatch staff and members of the organisation's network of contributors, based in countries across Europe. Statewatch also hosted an online database through which users could search the organisation's Library & Archive, including official EU documents. The technical limitations of the early web meant that to view material, users had to visit the organisation's office or request photocopies in the post.

The online database hosted by Statewatch was part of the organisation's work to create more transparency and openness around the powers and activities of EU institutions developing justice and home affairs laws and policies. The organisation filed hundreds of requests for access to documents, in particular to the Council of the EU, and was also able to obtain substantial numbers of documents through more informal means.

By 1998, Statewatch had submitted eight complaints to the European Ombudsman against the Council concerning public access to documents. As a result, the right of the Ombudsman to investigate secrecy complaints was written into the Amsterdam Treaty together with a commitment to “enshrine” the public's right of access to information in an EC Regulation. The organisation subsequently played a key role in a coalition of groups that fought to ensure the Regulation ensured the greatest degree of openness possible. Many of the documents obtained during that period are now available online in the Justice and Home Affairs Archive.

In 1998, Statewatch received an award from the Campaign for Freedom of Information for its work on fighting for EU openness and access to documents. In 2001, the European Information Association gave Statewatch the Chadwyck-Healey Award for achievement in European Information for its work on openness and the new code of access to EU documents.

Since 1999, Statewatch has published Statewatch News, an online news service that is a source for documents leaked from within EU institutions; for other original reporting; and for the circulation of material from related groups and campaigns. The documents published by the organisation, as well as its research and reporting, are regularly reported on by mainstream media outlets and used by civil society organisations for their own research, campaigning and advocacy.

=== Early 2000s ===
Statewatch Journal and Statewatch News covered a range of notable topics through the early 2000s. This included key issues such as the Genoa G8 protests in 2001, security and policing in Northern Ireland, UK stop-and-search statistics, detention centres and abuses against migrants and refugees, and the policing of protests, in particular those organised by the anti-globalisation movement. The organisation's 10th anniversary conference in 2001 brought together hundreds of people from across Europe to discuss and debate topics such as surveillance, the role of civil society organisations in monitoring the state, racism in Europe, and freedom of information.

During this time, Statewatch also reported on the effects of the “war on terror” on civil liberties, human rights and democratic standards. The organisation published news and reports on the “EU Scoreboard”, George W. Bush’s letter to the EU, new measures on data retention and the surveillance of air travel and profiling of passengers, amongst others. With the American Civil Liberties Union and Privacy International, they launched the Policy Laundering project, analysing how governments were writing counter-terrorism measures into law by passing them through international organisations, rather than national parliaments. They also kept several observatories, including one on the Passenger Name Record Directive, and produced a number of in-depth publications, including Countering Civil Rights, The War on Freedom and Democracy, and Journalism, Civil Liberties and the "War on Terrorism" (with the International Federation of Journalists).

Statewatch also contributed to research on the technological solutionism of governments that gained momentum during the war on terror. Measures introduced by the EU and European national governments frequently relied on the promise of new technologies to detect or prevent terrorism and crime. Statewatch primarily focused on the EU security research programme, which funds the development of new security and surveillance technologies.

In collaboration with the Transnational Institute, the organisation published the reports Arming Big Brother: the EU's Security Research Programme (in 2006), and NeoConOpticon: The EU Security-Industrial Complex (2009), which documented and analysed the ways in which the EU was using public funding to support the development of controversial and intrusive new security technologies, in many cases by large military and defence corporations. In 2009, Statewatch also published The Shape of Things to Come, which warned that the EU had embarked on several highly controversial paths, including harnessing digitisation to gather personal details on the everyday lives of everyone living in the European Union.

Statewatch was one of few organisations focusing on EU policy with regard to civil liberties and human rights at this time. Through this work, the organisation became recognised as a crucial information source at a time when the internet was not fully embedded in everyday life. Amongst the subscribers to the Bulletin/Journal were governmental institutions, social centres, activist groups, universities, and thousands of individuals; the Statewatch website received (and continues to receive) hundreds of thousands of hits every year.

=== 2010s ===
Statewatch continued work along similar themes into the 2010s. It continued producing the quarterly editions of the Bulletin/Journal, articles published via Statewatch News, and gave talks and presentations at events and conferences in countries across Europe. A conference held in 2011 for the 20th anniversary of the organisation once again brought together hundreds of people from across Europe for workshops and panel discussions on border control, immigration and asylum; state surveillance; the policing of protest; and racism and Islamophobia, amongst other topics.

Statewatch published two in-depth reports on drones during this period: Back from the battlefield: domestic drones in the UK, and Eurodrones, Inc.The reports, published at a time when states were seeking to find ways to make it possible to fly drones in civil airspace, argued that the technology would enhance the powers of agencies such as the police, yet were being treated as a technical matter that did not merit democratic or public debate.

At the same time, the growing spread and use of the web to access information led to a decline in the number of subscribers to the Statewatch Bulletin/Journal. The final edition was published in 2014, with articles intended for an edition that was never to make it to print published as an online collection. Statewatch News continued publication, providing access to a wide array of articles, press releases, sources, and hundreds of leaked EU documents every year.

Prominent amongst that output were articles exposing the European Commission providing funding to set up surveillance systems prior to legislation being passed; joint EU police operations targeting irregular migrants; the provision of hundreds of millions of euros for the development of drone technology; and EU funding for remote car-stopping technology, amongst other things. These articles received substantial coverage in the mainstream press and were also used by a wide variety of other groups for their work: for example, activists campaigning against racial profiling by the police, or MEPs seeking to stop EU legislation on the mandatory police surveillance of air travel.

As a partner in the project Securing Europe through Counter-terrorism: Impact, Legitimacy and Effectiveness (SECILE), Statewatch led the workstream on researching EU counter-terrorism legislation and conducted a 'stocktake' of EU counter-terrorism measures enacted since 11 September 2001, as well as collecting and analysing data about their implementation and assessment. This provided an empirical basis for other aspects of the project. Statewatch's research found that between legislative and non-legislative instruments, the EU had adopted at least 239 separate counter-terrorism measures since 9/11. 88 of those (36%) were legally binding, yet just three public consultations had been held, and only 22 impact assessments were conducted by the European Commission.

In 2017, the report Market forces: the development of the EU security-industrial complex provided an update on the themes that were first examined in the reports Arming Big Brother: the EU's Security Research Programme and NeoConOpticon: The EU Security-Industrial Complex. The report highlighted the ongoing provisions of millions of euros in public funding to major weapons and IT corporations, many of whom also played a role in determining the priorities of the research programme.

At the same time, Statewatch was engaged in a major effort to draw public and political attention to the EU's “interoperability” agenda, through which a number of large policing and migration databases would be interconnected, and a “Common Identity Repository” to store data on up to 300 million foreign nationals in the EU would be constructed.

This led to cooperation with the Platform for International Cooperation on Undocumented Migrants (PICUM), through the publication of Data Protection, Immigration Enforcement and Fundamental Rights: What the EU's Regulations on Interoperability Mean for People with Irregular Status. This report analysed the potential effects of the interoperability architecture for people living in the EU without official documents. The following year, Statewatch published Automated suspicion: The EU's new travel surveillance initiatives, a report that analysed how the EU's “interoperable” databases would introduce the algorithmic profiling of all travellers. In 2019, the organisation was awarded the Hostwriter Story Prize as part of a consortium of journalists working on the project Invisible Borders, which investigated the introduction of biometric identity controls by European and African governments.

== Awards ==
The organization and its former Director/Director Emeritus, Tony Bunyan, have received several awards for their civil rights activism. These include:

- 1998: The Campaign for Freedom of Information gave Statewatch an award for its work on fighting for EU openness (access to documents)
- 1999: Privacy International gave Statewatch an award for its work in exposing EU-FBI telecommunications surveillance plans
- 2001: The European Information Association gave Statewatch the "Chadwyck-Healey Award for achievement in European Information" for its work on openness and the new code of access to EU documents
- 2001 and 2004: the European Voice newspaper selected Tony Bunyan, Statewatch Director, as one of the 50 most influential people in the EU for Statewatch's work on access to documents in the EU (2001) and civil liberties and the “war on terror” (2004)
- 2011: Liberty awards Statewatch the human rights Long Walk Award: "For dedication to openness, democracy and informed debate about European institutions, keeping us reliably informed and suitably engaged for the last 20 years”
- 2019: The project Invisible Borders, undertaken with a team of journalists from across Europe, wins first place in the Hostwriter Story Prize competition

== Archives and Databases ==
The organization has an extensive Library & Archive and three free databases: a large database of all its news, articles and links since 1991, the Statewatch European Monitoring and Documentation Centre (SEMDOC) which monitors all new justice and home affairs measures since 1993.

=== Statewatch Library & Archive ===
Statewatch maintains a Library & Archive in its office in London, which is open for visits by the public.

The archive contains material primarily produced in the UK between the 1960s and the 1990s, with some dates going back even further. The collection includes around 800 books; over 2,500 items of ‘grey literature’ (pamphlets, zines, reports and more) on political and social struggles and movements; over 1,000 EU documents that are not currently hosted in the online Justice and Home Affairs Archive; the ABC Case Archive; complete and partial runs of more than 60 magazines and journals; and more than 350 political badges.

Topics covered by the material include police powers and public order; anti-racism and anti-fascism; criminal law; surveillance; prisons and detention sites; immigration, asylum and borders; and the powers and activities of security intelligence agencies.

In addition to the physical archive, Statewatch hosts multiple online databases, including the database of all its news research since 1991, the Statewatch European Monitoring and Documentation Centre (SEMDOC), and the EU Justice and Home Affairs (JHA) Archive.

=== Statewatch European Monitoring and Documentation Centre (SEMDOC) ===
The SEMDOC archive covered every measure, proposed and adopted, in the field of EU justice and home affairs policy from 1993 to 2019. It contains a legislative observatory of past, current and future JHA measures, although it is no longer updated.

=== The EU Justice and Home Affairs (JHA) Archive ===
The JHA Archive contains over 9,000 bibliographic records and full-text documents on EU Justice and Home Affairs policy from 1976 to 2000. The earliest records begin at the time the Trevi Group (an ad hoc intergovernmental cooperation on Terrorism, Radicalism and Violence) was created. This archive is used as a resource to demonstrate the historical development of EU JHA policy. Many documents from that period remain classified or have not been published in the Council of the EU's online register, and the European Commission's incomplete public register begins in 2002.

=== Statewatch Database ===
The Statewatch Database contains over 35,000 items. It includes everything Statewatch has published since 1991, including Statewatch News, the Statewatch Bulletin/Journal and the State Research archive alongside official reports and documentation, analyses, links and more.
