= Bits of Freedom =

Dutch digital rights advocacy group

Stichting Bits of Freedom
- Logo since 2017
- Abbreviation: BoF
- Formation: 2000
- Type: Stichting
- Website: bitsoffreedom.nl

Stichting Bits Of Freedom is a Dutch non-profit advocacy group focused on digital rights such as the right to privacy and communication. It was founded 2000 and had break between 2006 and August 2009, due to lack of funding. In August 2009, Bits of Freedom restarted its activities with funding provided by the Internet4All Foundation.

Bits of Freedom organizes the Dutch version of the Big Brother Awards, initiated European cooperation between digital rights watch foundations in European Digital Rights (EDRI) and collects information about data leaks in the Netherlands to raise awareness of the potential dangers of increasing collection of data.

== History ==
Logo as of 2016
Logo as of 2003

=== The Multatuli Project ===
The Multatuli Project, subtitled ISP Notice and take down, was the title of an experiment done by members of the Bits of Freedom group in the summer of 2004. The group uploaded excerpts from Multatuli to websites hosted at 10 different Dutch ISPs, content which has been in the public domain since 1957. They then sent a complaint about the content from a Hotmail account posing as a legal advisor to the 10 ISPs; seven of them complied and removed the site, one within just three hours, without investigating the legality of the matter, or asking questions about the dubious background of the requester.

=== Big Brother Awards ===
To raise awareness of privacy-related issues, Bits of Freedom holds annual Big Brother Awards. This prize is awarded to businesses, governmental institutions and persons who have harmed privacy or increased civilian surveillance in the past year. The award is named after the character "Big Brother" from George Orwell's Nineteen Eighty-Four.

The winners of the Big Brother Awards 2011 were the National Police Services Agency (now the national police corps) (in the category "governmental institutions") for the use of spyware and hacking of hacking victims, minister Edith Schippers (in the category "people") for forcing a restart of the Dutch Electronic health record, in spite of it not being supported by the Netherlands Senate, Facebook (in the category "business") for going to the stock market without safeguards for user privacy and finally minister Fred Teeven (in the category "popular vote") for further harming privacy legislation.

== See also ==
- Electronic Frontier Foundation
- European Digital Rights
- Free culture movement
- La Quadrature du Net
