= Hostwriter =

International non-profit organization serving journalists

- Formation: 2013
- Founder: Tamara Anthony, Tabea Grzeszyk, Sandra Zistl
- Location: Berlin, Germany
- Website: hostwriter.org

Hostwriter is a non-profit, tax-exempt organization that serves as an open network to help journalists to easily collaborate across borders. It connects journalists for the purpose of seeking and offering help, whether in the form of story collaboration, local advice or accommodation.

Hostwriter was founded in Hamburg, Germany, in 2013 by German journalists Tamara Anthony, Tabea Grzeszyk and Sandra Zistl. Because these co-founders knew the difficulties journalists faced when trying to network across their city, or even their country, they built a platform that would make it easier.

The idea for the organization grew from co-founder Tabea Grzeszyk's experience using CouchSurfing for her trip to Turkey, Lebanon and Syria in 2010. She thought it would be useful if a journalist covering a story could not just travel to a different region or country, but could, at the same time, make contact with local journalists who could answer questions and make the research process easier or add a local perspective to the research.

Co-founder Tamara Anthony says the key idea is that journalists "collaborate rather than compete," and that through collaboration, journalists can serve "as a door opener" for colleagues from outside their region. Co-founder Sandra Zistl said the network is especially important to independent journalists and documentary filmmakers, particularly in countries without a "journalistic infrastructure" that ensures the freedom of the press.

The organization's office is located in Berlin, and the platform itself has more than 3,800 journalists from 136 countries worldwide (as of November 2018).

== Programs ==
Hostwriter offers several programs for journalists at all career levels.

=== Training Programs ===
Hostwriter's mission is to improve cross-border collaborations among journalists. The organization provides training in cross-border journalism, following the guidelines laid out in Brigitte Alfter's book, Handbuch zum Cross-Border-Journalismus (Handbook for Cross-Border Journalism). Hostwriter also organizes events such as panel discussions at the New York Times Athens Democracy Forum and the International Journalism Festival in Perugia.

=== The Agora Project ===
With funding from Advocate Europe, Hostwriter teamed up with Armenian Changemakers on the Agora Project, which established a temporary newsroom for ten young journalists from Croatia, Spain, Greece, Germany, Serbia, Italy, Great Britain, Austria, and Portugal. The journalists collaborated on stories about the biggest challenges facing Europe ahead of the 2017 European elections, including migration and citizenship rights, political polarization, and the threat robots pose to human jobs. The resulting stories were posted in The Agora Project Dossier in late 2017. According to an article by MediaShift, the reporters covered stories about a variety of issues including immigration, automation, and populism. "In Serbia, Stefan Janjić spoke to young men about the role of religion in an area of recent upheaval. Cȧtia Bruno reported on how working-class communities in Portugal cling to history in the face of increasing populism across Europe. Daniela Sala went to Sweden to speak to asylum seekers stuck in the system with no clear options. And Sissy Gkournelou looked at issues of trust in the media in Greece and Germany." Hostwriter plans to repeat the program, organizing a cross-border collaboration project on every continent with the use of funding awarded through the Google Impact Challenge Germany 2018.

=== Hostwriter Prizes ===
Starting in 2014, Hostwriter has awarded annual prizes for "collaborative journalism pieces, as well as promising story pitches." The prizes are donated by the German Otto-Sprenger Stiftung (foundation) and come with a monetary award and publicity for the winning stories.

=== Ambassador Network ===
Hostwriter recently selected 28 members to act as representatives and to "communicate its vision and objectives to journalists and media professionals in their respective countries and regions." This Ambassador Network had its first summit in Warsaw, Poland, in September 2018.

== Awards ==
In 2018, Hostwriter was awarded the Jury Prize for the Google Impact Challenge Deutschland in the "Leuchtturm-Projekt" category. The organization received a total award of €500,000 from the Google.org.

== Supervisory Board ==
Hostwriter's Supervisory Board has five members.

- Tamara Anthony, chairwoman and ARD parliament correspondent
- Jutta Freifrau von Falkenhausen, Vice-chairwoman and lawyer
- Maren Heltsche, Data analyst and developer
- Simon Tennant, Production Engineering Manager at SoundCloud
- Michael Weber, Financial expert and founder
- Eva-Maria McCormack, Strategic communications consultant
- Sylke Tempel, former Editor-in-Chief "Berlin Policy Journal" (was a board member until her death in October 2017).

== Code of Ethics ==
Hostwriter has a code of ethics stating that "members of the network should treat each other professionally, never compromising sources or in-progress work."

== Transparency Efforts ==
Hostwriter is a member of Transparency International Deutschland e.V. (Transparency Germany), which is the national chapter of Transparency International. Transparency International is a global network whose basic principles are integrity, accountability, transparency and participation in civil society.

== Data Protection Policy ==
Hostwriter is complying with the EU Data Protection Regulation (GDPR). It has listed on its website an overview of the data they hold for its members and what they do with it.
