= European Digital Rights =

International advocacy group

- Abbreviation: EDRi
- Formation: 2002, Berlin, Germany
- Type: International non-profit association
- Purpose: Privacy, Data Protection, Net Neutrality, Copyright
- Headquarters: Brussels, Belgium
- ED: Amber Sinha
- Website: edri.org

European Digital Rights (EDRi) is an international advocacy group headquartered in Brussels, Belgium. EDRi is a network collective of non-profit organizations (NGO), experts, advocates and academics working to defend and advance digital rights across the continent. As of October 2022, EDRi is made of more than 40 NGOs, as well as experts, advocates and academics from all across Europe.

== History ==
European Digital Rights (EDRi) is a not-for-profit association registered in Belgium.

EDRi was founded in June 2002 in Berlin by ten non-profits from seven countries, as a result of a growing awareness of the importance of European policymaking in the digital environment. The group was created in response to some of the earliest challenges in this policy area. Its founding board members were Maurice Wessling from Bits of Freedom, Andy Müller-Maguhn from the Chaos Computer Club and Meryem Marzouki from Imaginons un Réseau Internet Solidaire. Since inception, EDRi has grown significantly.

In October 2014, 34 privacy and civil rights organisations from 19 different countries in Europe had EDRi membership, and the organisation continued to grow. The need for cooperation among digital rights organisations active in Europe was increasing as more regulation regarding the Internet, copyright and privacy is proposed by European institutions, or by international institutions with strong effect in Europe.

In March 2021, EDRi comprised 44 NGOs, as well as experts, advocates and academics from all across Europe.

=== Members ===
- Epicenter.works
- Initiative für Netzfreiheit ("Internet Freedom Initiative")
- quintessenz
- VIBE!AT
- Human Rights League
- Internet Society – Bulgaria
- Iuridicum Remedium
- IT-Political Association of Denmark (IT-Pol)
- Electronic Frontier Finland (EFFI)
- La Quadrature du Net
- Chaos Computer Club (CCC e.V.)
- Digitalcourage (Note: Digitalcourage was previously named FoeBuD)
- Digitale Gesellschaft
- Forum InformatikerInnen für Frieden und gesellschaftliche Verantwortung (FIfF e.V.)
- Förderverein Informationstechnik und Gesellschaft (FITUG e.V.)
- Free Software Foundation Europe
- Wikimedia Deutschland
- Homo Digitalis
- Digital Rights Ireland
- ALCEI ("Association for the Freedom of Interactive Electronic Communications")
- HERMES Center
- Metamorphosis
- Bits of Freedom
- Vrijschrift
- Electronic Frontier Norway (EFN)
- Modern Poland Foundation
- Panoptykon Foundation
- Associação D3 - Defesa dos Direitos Digitais
- Association for Technology and Internet (APTI)
- Share Foundation
- Nodo50.org
- Xnet
- DFRI (Digital Freedom and Rights Association)
- Alternative Informatics Association
- Article 19
- Foundation for Information Policy Research (FIPR)
- Open Rights Group
- Statewatch
- Access Now
- NOYB
- Privacy International
- Electronic Frontier Foundation (EFF)
- Electronic Privacy Information Center (EPIC)

Former:

- Icelandic Digital Freedom Society
- Society for Open Internet Technologies

== Activities ==
EDRi's objective is to promote, protect, and uphold civil rights in the field of information and communication technology. This includes many issues relating to privacy and digital rights, from data retention to copyright and software patents, from the right to data protection and privacy to freedom of speech online, from privatised enforcement to cybersecurity.

EDRi provides a strong civil society voice and platform to ensure that European policy, which affects the digital environment, is in line with fundamental rights.

Recently, EDRi highlighted fundamental rights issues in the current collective rights management regime and privacy implications of online tracking. The organisation continues to defend citizens' right to private copying, air travellers' privacy and the right to freedom of expression in the notice and takedown debates in Europe. It supports improving citizens' access to audiovisual online content and promotes a legal protection of Net neutrality in Europe. EDRi also fights for an update of copyright, and against blanket retention of communications data. EDRi's key priorities are currently privacy, surveillance, net neutrality and copyright reform.

In addition to regular publications, such as booklets known as the "EDRi papers", EDRi publishes yearly reports and a bi-weekly newsletter about digital civil rights in Europe, the EDRi-gram.

Among key campaigns launched by European Digital Rights are, in 2003 and 2011, against passenger name records (PNRs), in 2005, against data retention and in 2010 and in favour of a copyright reform. EDRi actively participated in the vast campaign against ACTA which successfully ended with the rejection of the proposal by the European Parliament in July 2012. During the European elections 2014, EDRi led an innovative campaign to raise the profile of digital rights issues. To this end, EDRi's members drafted a 10-point Charter of Digital Rights that candidates running for the European Parliament could promise to defend. These principles include the promotion of transparency and citizen participation; the support for data protection and privacy, unrestricted access to the Internet, an update for copyright legislation; promotion of online anonymity and encryption, multistakeholderism, and open source software.

European Digital Rights and its members fought as well for the General Data Protection Regulation. Through an important awareness-raising campaign, citizens were able to contact Members of the European Parliament representing their country in order to ask them to defend fundamental rights to privacy and data protection. After the regulation was passed, EDRi associates began to file complaints to enforce it.

Launched in October 2020 and coordinated by EDRi, ReclaimYourFace is a European movement that brings people's voices into the democratic debate about the use of our biometric data. The coalition calls for a prohibition on the use of our most sensitive data for mass surveillance in public spaces due to its impact on our rights and freedoms.

The initiative launched a European Citizens' Initiative in February 2021 and calls on the European Commission to strictly regulate the use of biometric surveillance technologies.

== See also ==
- Data protection
- Digital rights
- General Data Protection Regulation
