= Digitalcourage =

German privacy and digital rights organisation

- Formation: 1987
- Type: Registered association
- Purpose: Politics, freedom, privacy
- Location: Bielefeld, Germany
- Official language: german, english
- Staff: 13 (2018)
- Website: digitalcourage.de (english version)
- Formerly called: FoeBuD (until Nov 2012)

Digitalcourage – known until November 2012 as FoeBuD (German: Verein zur Förderung des öffentlichen bewegten und unbewegten Datenverkehrs) – is a German privacy and digital rights organisation. Under the motif of preserving "a world worth living in the digital age", Digitalcourage campaigns for civil and human rights, consumer protection, privacy, freedom of information and related issues. The group has links with organisations such as the German Working Group against Data Retention (Arbeitskreis Vorratsdatenspeicherung) and the Chaos Computer Club, and it is a member of the umbrella organisation European Digital Rights.

== Campaigns ==
The group is known for organising the German Big Brother Awards. These negative awards recognise “companies, institutions and persons who act in a prominent and sustained way to invade people's privacy or leak (personal) data to third parties”. An annual award ceremony featuring “winners” in various categories is organised by Digitalcourage.

To highlight the privacy implications of bonus or customer “loyalty” cards, the organisation issued the so-called “Privacy Card”. Its design mirrored the popular “Payback” card and it bore the number of a regular card registered in FoeBuD's name. Users collected bonus points on behalf of FoeBuD, sharing one and the same customer profile. After 2,000 of these cards were being used, Payback disabled FoeBuD's registration and card contract.

Logo of the "Stop RFID" campaign

Since October 2003, Digitalcourage has been active on the issue of RFID and founded a campaign called “StopRFID” to accompany the introduction of this technology from a critical perspective.

FoeBuD has organised or supported various complaints at the German Constitutional Court against disputed laws, such as those on data retention, a central database for employees’ wages, or Internet blocking.

FoeBuD was a co-founder of the German Working Group against Data Retention and supports an annual demonstration focusing on security measures that restrict civil liberties, under the name “Freedom Not Fear”.

In response to the threat to anonymity posed by data retention, Digitalcourage is running a Tor exit node on a rented server. The organisation also makes and sells the PrivacyDongle, a USB pen drive that can be used to run Tor Browser as a portable app, i.e. without installing it under Windows or macOS. As part of the campaign against the now abandoned law to introduce Internet blocking (Zugangserschwerungsgesetz), which would have been implemented by DNS poisoning, Digitalcourage is operating a public "anti-censorship" DNS server. Since 2018, its IP address is 46.182.19.48 (= dns2.digitalcourage.de). Since December 2020, they have provided a third DNS server (IP address 5.9.164.112 = dns3.digitalcourage.de, port 853) exclusively for encrypted/private DNS according to the DNS over TLS standard.

== Earlier activities: mailbox systems ==
In 1987, a mailbox (bulletin board) system named BIONIC was created and operated by FoeBuD members. Objectives were to run a mailbox without censorship and to deny unlimited rights to the system's administrators, regulating conflicts through the community instead. BIONIC became the birthplace of several early mailbox networks. The mailbox and linked networks were an early "home on the net" for many groupings in the left or "alternative" political spectrum.

Eric Bachman, a BIONIC user and FoeBuD member, instigated the ZaMir Transnational Network in 1991 in response to the Yugoslav wars, which were beginning at the time. Za mir means "for peace", and the network served as a low-cost and simple link between peace groups in that region, as a form of nonviolent resistance. The BIONIC software proved useful under the limited resources available; e.g. in Sarajevo, 1,500 users were served using just 3 telephone lines. Other mailboxes existed in Ljubljana (Slovenia), Zagreb (Croatia), Belgrade (Serbia), Tuzla (Bosnia) and Priština (Kosovo).

== Origins and name ==
FoeBuD co-founders Rena Tangens and padeluun had been active in the punk rock and media art scenes and established a gallery named Art d’Ameublement in Bielefeld in 1984. The gallery hosted the Chaos Computer Club as an exhibit in 1985, and a group of local enthusiasts for then-current forms of computer communication, hacking and social or philosophical matters formed around the gallery. This led to a monthly event called "Public Domain" that was both a meeting for practical research and a talk and discussion series.

Eventually, an association with charity status was formed. The organisation's full name, "association for the promotion of public mobile and immobile data exchange" (German: Verein zur Förderung des öffentlichen bewegten und unbewegten Datenverkehrs), and the acronym FoeBuD were conceived as a parody of the language used by the telecommunications operator Deutsche Bundespost, which was then the state authority and monopolist for telephone and postal communications. Telecommunications equipment was heavily regulated on the German network, and the devices that were available often had names and acronyms that appeared bureaucratic and cumbersome. As FoeBuD's activities and reputation spread outside the hacker scene and the historic background has largely been lost, the name was often perceived as just obscure.

As the organisation was nearing its 25th anniversary, it was perceived that the name FoeBuD had turned from an in-joke into an obstacle for the group's publicity. A new name was sought, and eventually "Digitalcourage" was chosen and announced on 17 November 2012.

== Recognition ==
The ZaMir network was chosen for an award named "sense/information" (German: Sinnformation) by the Green parliamentary party in the German parliament (Bundestag) in 1998. FoeBuD received a nationally reputed award, the Theodor Heuss medal, for its civil rights activities in 2008.
