= Simon Davies (privacy advocate) =

British privacy advocate

- Occupations: Advocate, academic

Simon Davies is a British privacy advocate and academic from Australia, formerly based in London, UK. Davies was one of the first campaigners in the field of international privacy advocacy, founding the watchdog organisation Privacy International in 1990 and subsequently working in emerging areas of privacy such as electronic visual surveillance, identity systems, border security, encryption policy and biometrics.

In July 2008 Davies criticised the Stranton landmark Viacom vs. Google & YouTube ruling, stating the privacy of millions of YouTube users was threatened: 'The chickens have come home to roost for Google. Their arrogance and refusal to listen to friendly advice has resulted in the privacy of tens of millions being placed under threat. Governments and organisations are realising that companies like Google have a warehouse full of data. And while that data is stored it is under threat of being used and putting privacy in danger.' Davies was also listed as current chief executive officer of UK consultancy group 80/20 Thinking Limited, which is defunct as of June 2015.

In 2022, Davies was convicted of child sex offences committed in Sydney in the 1980s, having been wanted by police in New South Wales since 2016.

== Academic posts ==
Davies has been a visiting fellow in law at both the University of Greenwich and the University of Essex. He has also been a visiting senior fellow within the Department of Management of the London School of Economics (LSE). He is also codirector of the LSE's Policy Engagement Network which is presently researching options for the process stage of the development of a new British constitution. In 2014, he has been a visiting professor at John Cabot University, an American university in Rome, Italy.

== Awards ==
In April 1999 Davies received the Electronic Frontier Foundation's Pioneer Award for his contribution to online freedom. In 2007 was made a fellow of the British Computer Society. In both 2004 and 2005 silicon.com voted him as one of the world's 50 most influential people in technology policy.

== Conviction for child sexual offences ==
Police investigations began in 2010 after allegations of child sexual abuse during the 1980s when Davies had been chief executive of the Homeless Children's Association in Darlinghurst in Sydney. Other workers at this youth shelter were also subsequently convicted of child abuse offences. A NSW warrant was issued for Davies’ arrest in 2016, which was followed by an Interpol red notice in 2017, in an attempt to locate Davies.

In 2019, Davies gave himself up to police in The Netherlands, and was subsequently held in custody pending extradition. Originally accused of 18 offences against four victims, nine charges were dropped as part of extradition proceedings due to the statute of limitations in the Netherlands. He was extradited in April 2021 and charged by the New South Wales police with 'numerous' historical counts of abuse. He pleaded guilty to five child abuse charges, committed against two teenagers and was subsequently convicted. Davies was sentenced in late 2022 to 10 years imprisonment, with six years and three months non-parole period, and will be eligible for parole in March 2026.
