= Big Brother Awards =

Ironic award for threats to personal privacy

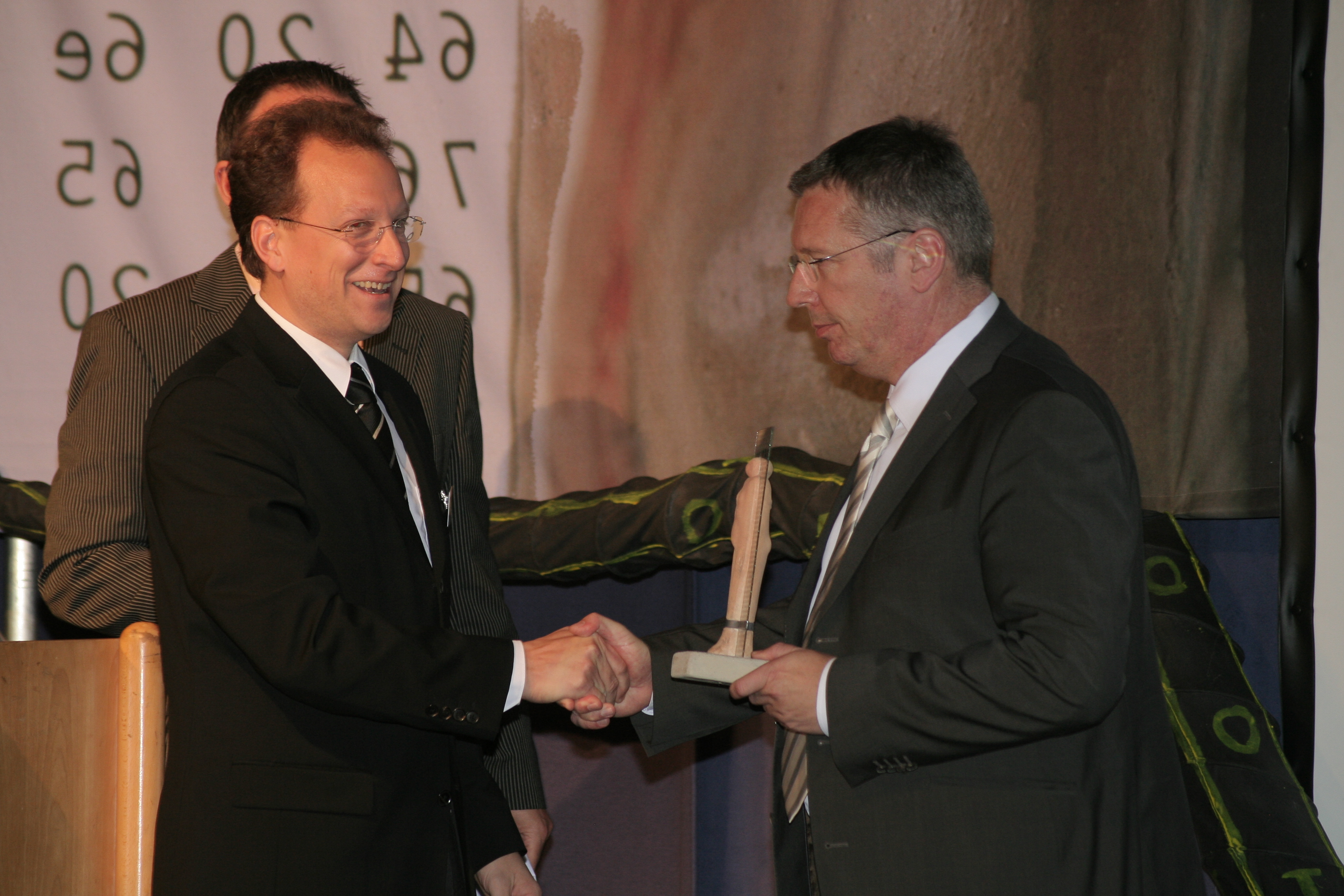
Big Brother Award 2008

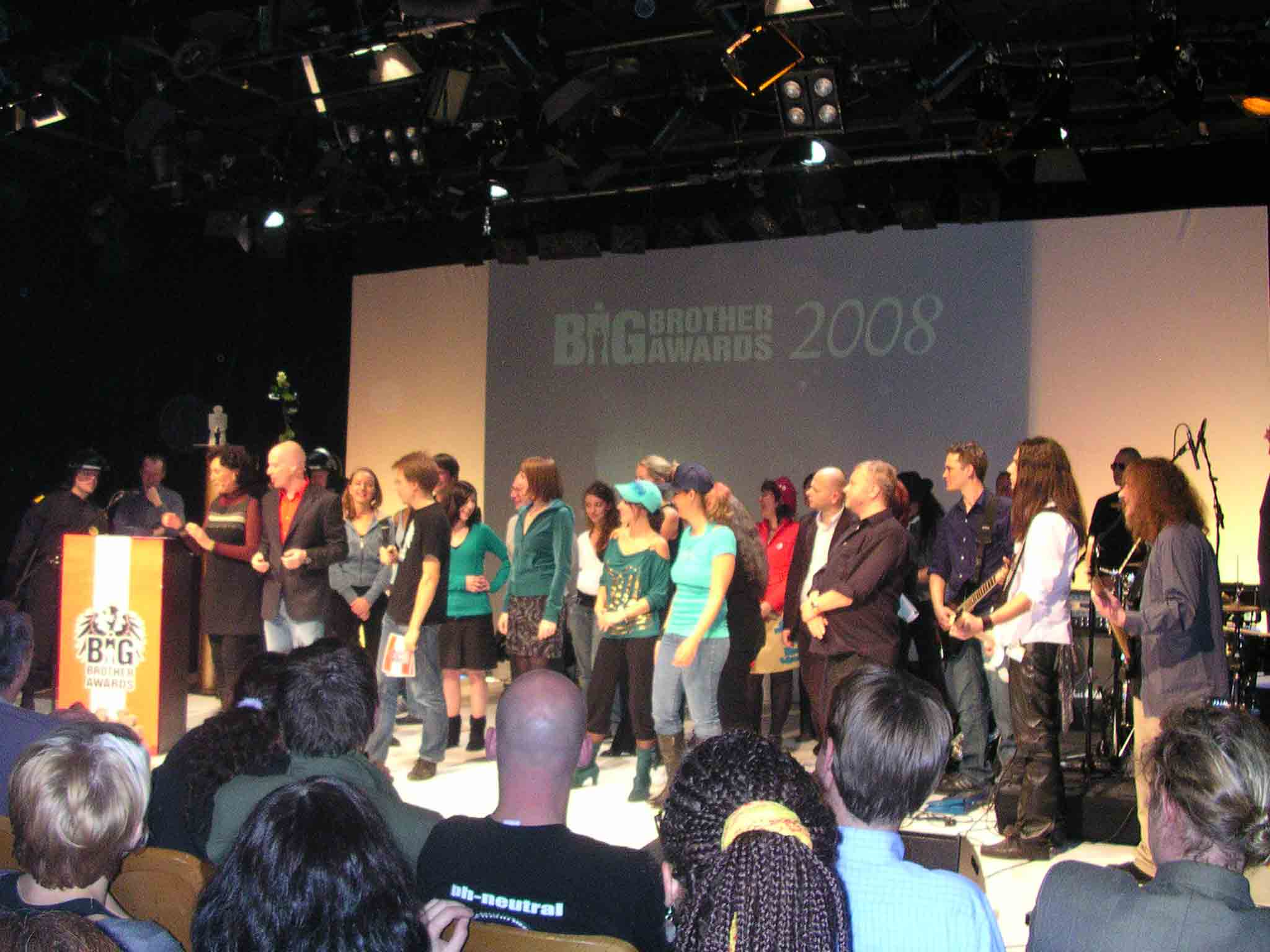
Big Brother Awards 2008

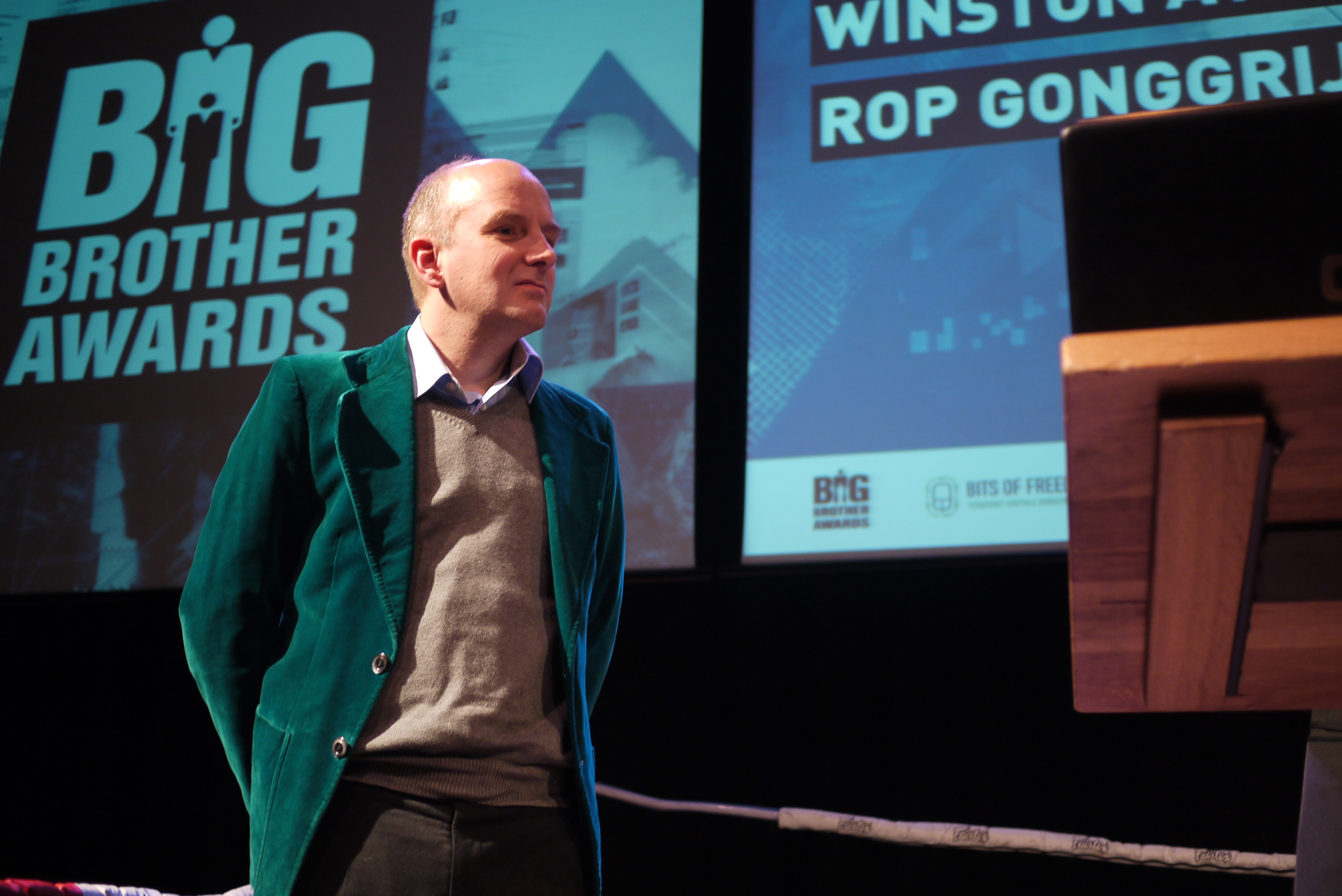
Big Brother Awards 2010

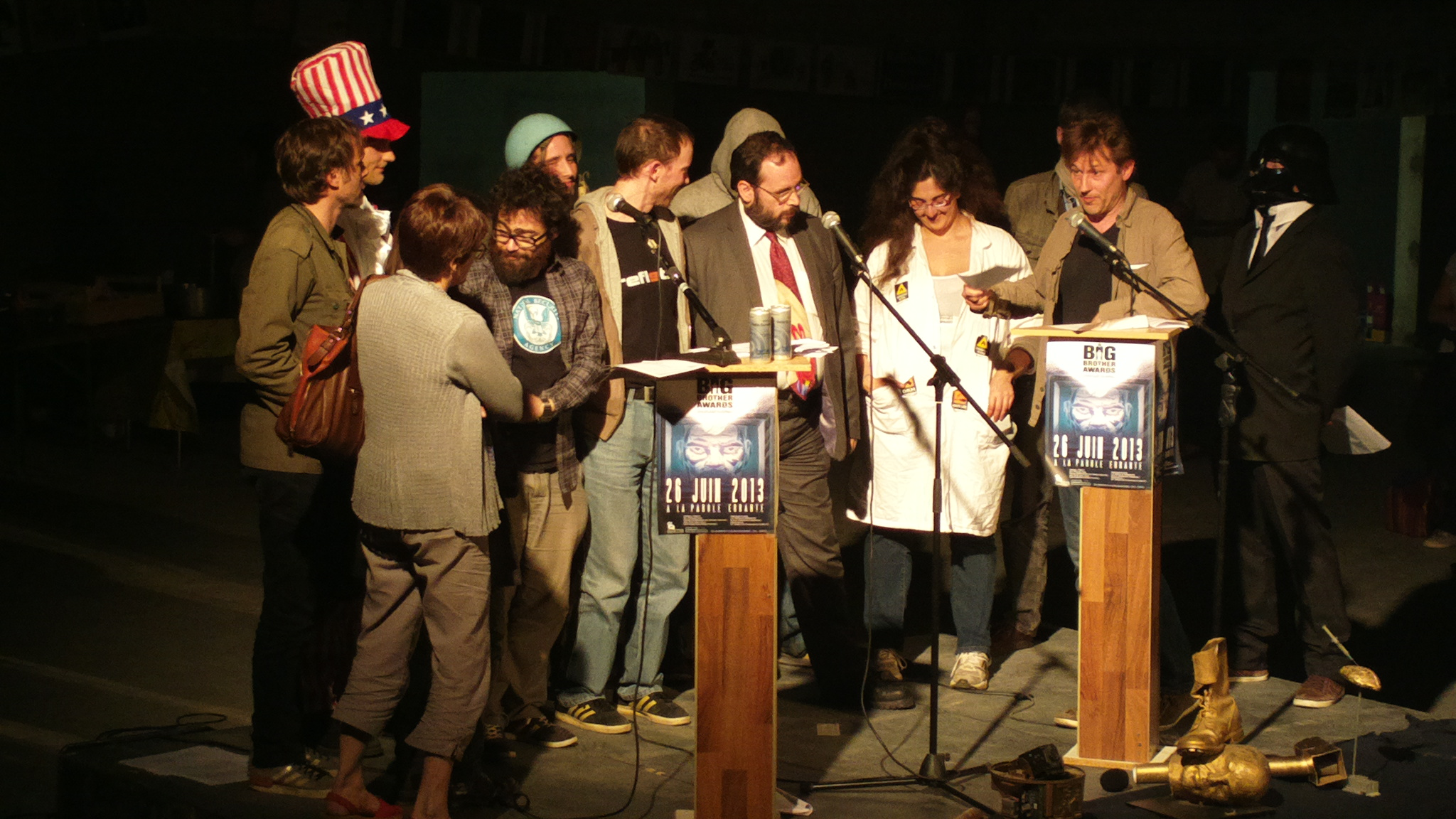
Big Brother Awards 2013

The Big Brother Awards (BBAs) are mocking awards that recognize "the government and private sector organizations ... which have done the most to threaten personal privacy". They are named after the George Orwell character Big Brother from the novel Nineteen Eighty-Four. They are awarded yearly to authorities, companies, organizations, and persons that it is asserted have been acting particularly and consistently to threaten or violate people's privacy, or disclosed people's personal data to third parties.

The awards are intended to draw public attention to privacy issues and related alarming trends in society, especially in data privacy. The contest is organized by a loose coalition of nongovernmental organizations, including Iuridicum Remedium, Privacy International, and others.

The United States' most recently hosted its Big Brother Awards – also known as the Orwell Awards or simply the Orwells – on 14 April 2005 in Seattle, Washington. They had previously been hosted in Berkeley, California, on 12 April 2004; New York City on 3 April 2003; San Francisco, California, on 18 April 2002; and Cambridge, Massachusetts, on 7 March 2001. The first annual US Big Brother Awards were made at the Computers, Freedom and Privacy Conference in Washington, D.C., on 7 April 1999, the 50th anniversary of the publication of Orwell's Nineteen Eighty-Four. The awards were made by Simon Davies, managing director of the London-based Privacy International to recognize "the government and private sector organizations which have done the most to invade personal privacy in the United States." The awards were given in five categories: Greatest Corporate Invader, Lifetime Menace, Most Invasive Program, People's Choice, and Worst Public Official.

== Countries ==
The following countries have their own version of the Big Brother Awards:

- Australia
- Austria
- Bulgaria
- Czech Republic
- Finland
- France
- Germany
- Netherlands
- Spain
- United Kingdom

== See also ==
- Brandeis Award (privacy)
- Mass surveillance
- Orwell Award
