= SHARE Foundation =

SHARE Foundation, also known as SHARE El Salvador, is an international organization that promotes the development of El Salvador. Founded in 1981, the organization maintains offices in San Salvador and the San Francisco Bay Area in California.

During the 1980s, the foundation funded investigations about Jean Donovan's death. In the early 2000s, the foundation criticized the El Salvador government's intent to privatize the health sector. The foundation also supported the creation of the Salvadoran-American Day (El Dia del Salvadoreno).

== See also ==
- Salvadoran Americans
