= Bernd Fix =

German hacker and computer security expert

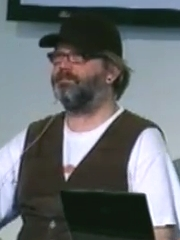
- At 24C3 in Berlin (2007)
- Born: Bernd Robert Fix; 19 March 1962; Wittingen, Germany
- Occupation: Hacker
- Known for: Computer virus research

Bernd Fix (born 19 March 1962 in Wittingen, Lower Saxony) is a German hacker and computer security expert.

== Biography ==
After final secondary-school examination from Gymnasium Hankensbüttel in 1981, Bernd Fix studied Astrophysics and Philosophy at the universities of Göttingen and Heidelberg. He received his diplom for a work in the field of theoretical astrophysics in 1989. From 1998 Fix was living and working in Switzerland; he moved to Berlin in 2014.

In 1986 Fix joined the Chaos Computer Club (CCC) in Hamburg and started to work on computer security issues, focussing on computer virus research. He published a first demo virus (Rushhour) in autumn 1986 in the Datenschleuder #17, the hacker magazine edited by the CCC. He also contributed results of his research to the book "Computer Viruses" by Ralf Burger. From 1987 to 1989 Fix was one of the spokespersons for the Chaos Computer Club and author for the "Hacker Bible 2".

In 1987 he devised a method to neutralize the Vienna Virus; this event marks the first documented antivirus software ever written.

Fix is also the author of several research viruses; among them the VP370 virus for IBM mainframe computers. The VP370 source code was allegedly stolen by the Bundesnachrichtendienst (Federal Intelligence Service in Germany) in 1988 to be used in attacks against East Block and NATO mainframe computer systems in the so-called "Project Rahab".

=== Wau Holland Foundation and WikiLeaks ===
After the death of his friend Wau Holland (co-founder of the Chaos Computer Club) in 2001 Fix helped to establish the Wau Holland Foundation and serves as a founding member of the Board of Directors ever since.

According to Fix, when the Wau Holland Foundation started official operations in 2003, he and other founding members were in contact with Julian Assange and in 2009 they decided to support WikiLeaks. According to an interview from 2011, he got fired from his job at SIX Financial Information because of the foundation's support for WikiLeaks.

In July 2016, on the same day "Guccifer 2.0" sent Assange an encrypted 1 GB file containing stolen DNC emails, German hackers Andrew Müller-Maguhn and Bernd Fix met with Assange for at least four hours. Müller-Maguhn, the Wau Holland Foundation Vice President, is named in the Mueller report as a possible conduit for delivering hacked emails to Assange. According to The Washington Post, a former WikiLeaks associate said that year Müller-Maguhn and a colleague oversaw submissions to WikiLeaks server that year, which Müller-Maguhn denied. According to court documents, Müller-Maguhn and Bernd Fix were identified as priority targets of UC Global's spying.
