= Shackspace =

Coordinates: 48°46′38″N 9°14′8″E

shackspace
- Formation: 2009
- Type: NPO
- Purpose: Hacking, DIY
- Location: Stuttgart, Germany
- Volunteers: ~110 (138 in 2020, 200 in 2016, 250 in 2015, 207 in 2013, 90 in 2011)
- Website: www.shackspace.de
- Formerly called: hs07

shackspace is hackerspace in Stuttgart run by shack e.V., a non-profit association, established in 2009. Originally located in North Stuttgart, it moved to Stuttgart-Wangen in March 2011.

== History ==
The idea of a Stuttgart hackerspace was born at the BarCamp Stuttgart in September 2009. In February 2010 a shackspace association was founded, with 23 founding members, who moved to the planned location in North Stuttgart in April 2010. The hackerspace grew rapidly in its first year and moved to a larger facility, located in Stuttgart-Wangen, in March 2011. shackspace is primarily financed through membership dues but has historically accepted public funding and third party sponsorship that have allowed expansion and improvement of rooms, purchase of equipment, and realization of bigger projects.

== Activities and events ==
The purpose of shackspace is to increase knowledge and skills related to computer software, hardware and data networks. The association is engaged in numerous activities. For example, the society participated in the Hobby & Elektronik fair in 2010, 2011 and 2014 where they gave workshops, presentations and showcased projects. The shackspace society is also present at events of the Chaos Computer Club, such as the Chaos Communication Congress, Chaos Communication Camp, Gulaschprogrammiernacht (GPN) and many others.

shackspace is also used by other initiatives and groups in and around Stuttgart to host events (tech talks, workshops, project demos, and parties), such as Thunder Talks, Java and Python workshops, public viewing of Google I/O and worldwide HTML5 Campout in collaboration with Google Developer Group Stuttgart, regular meetups of the Linux User Group Stuttgart (LUGS), KDE Code Sprint, NASA International Space Apps Challenge.

shackspace is an incubator for many projects. One of the projects include Hackerspace Global Grid, distributed sensor and communication network.
