= Gehrden =

- Town
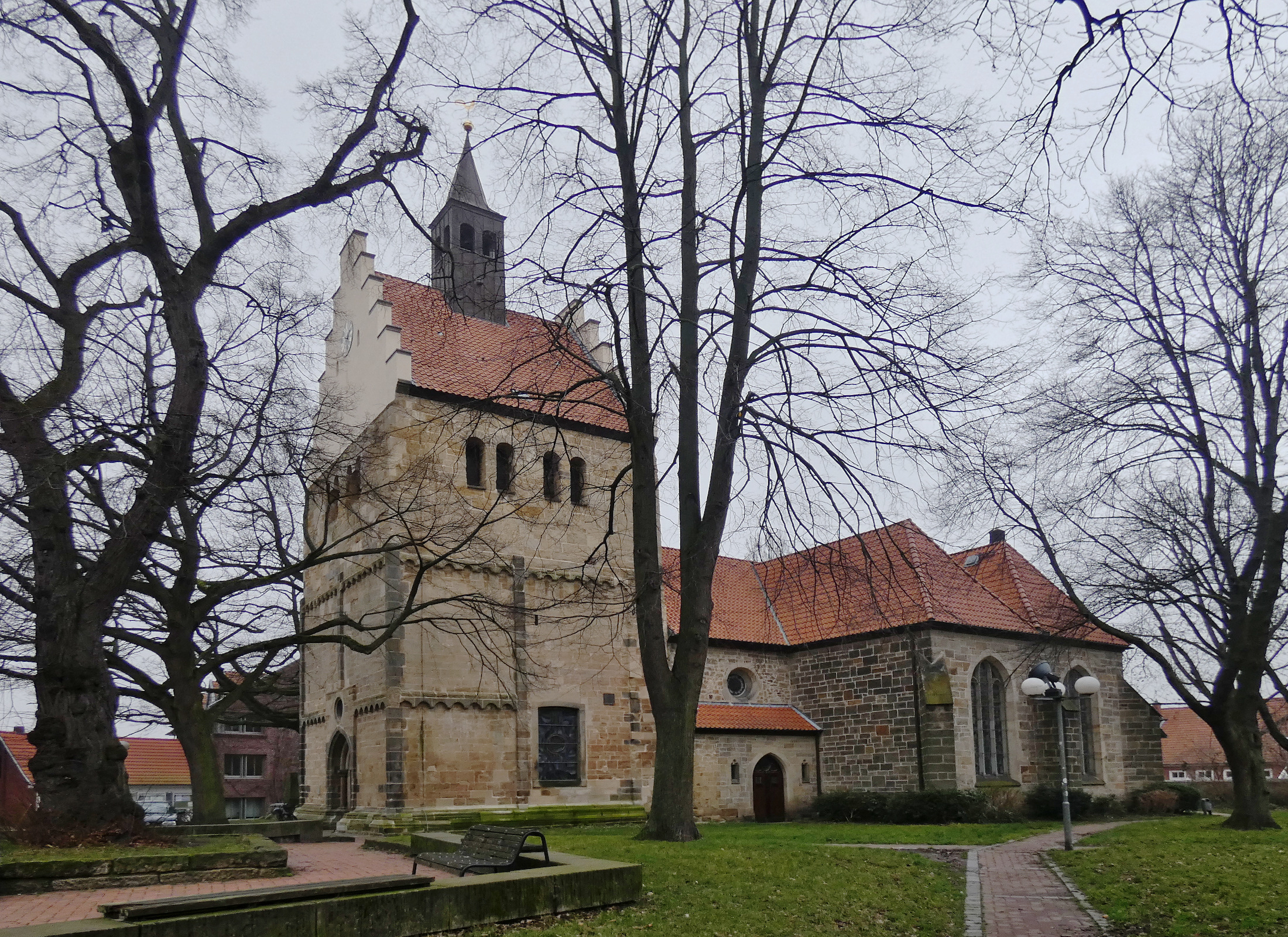
- Church of Saint Margaret

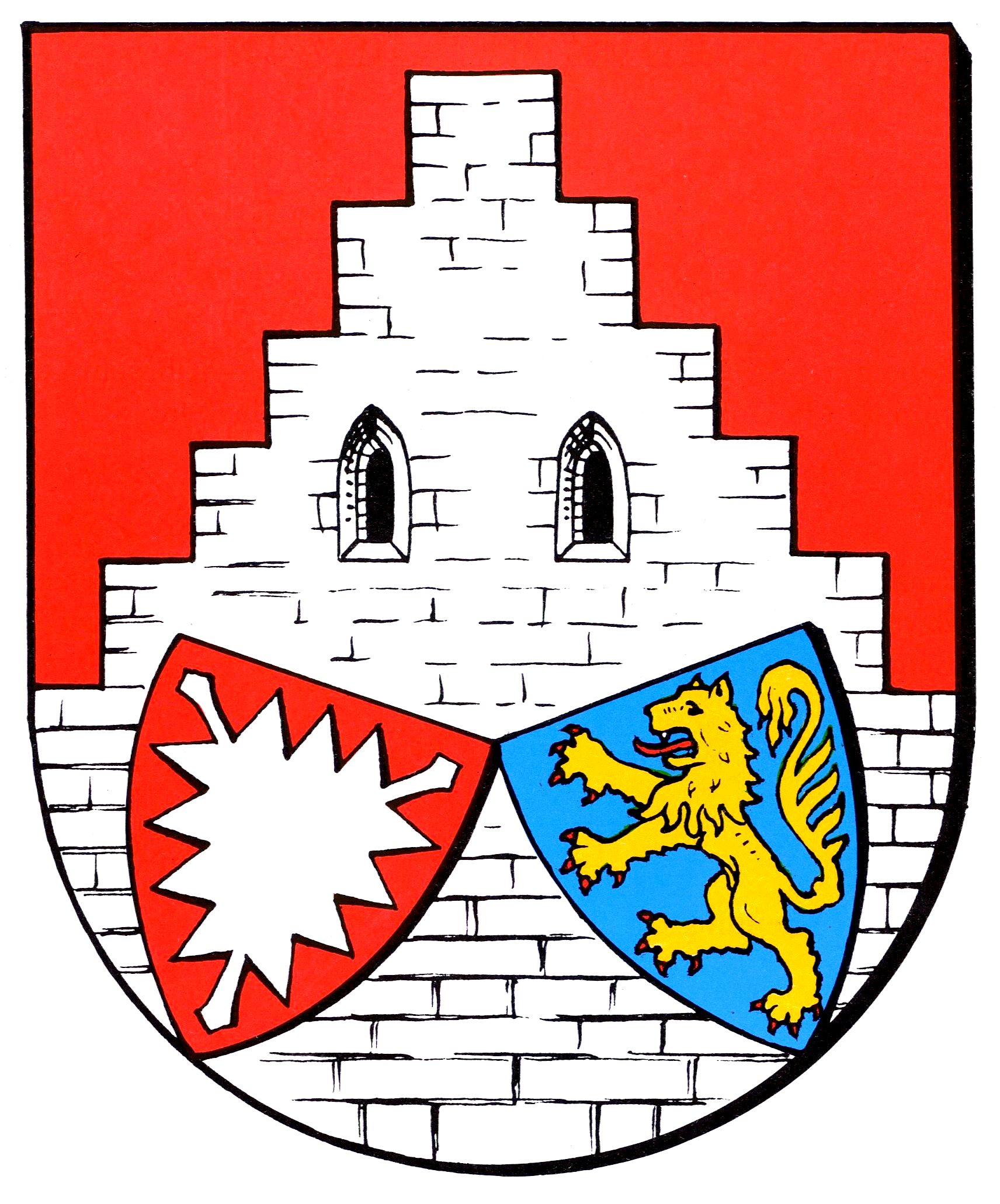
- Coat of arms

- Location of Gehrden within Hanover district
- Interactive map of Gehrden
- Location within Germany Location within Lower Saxony
- Coordinates: 52°18′42″N 9°36′01″E
- Country: Germany
- State: Lower Saxony
- District: Hanover

Government
  - Mayor: Cord Mittendorf (SPD)

Area
  - Total: 43.24 km^{2} (16.70 sq mi)
- Elevation: 90 m (300 ft)

Population (2025-12-31)
  - Total: 15,435
  - Density: 357.0/km^{2} (924.5/sq mi)
- Time zone: UTC+01:00 (CET)
  - Summer (DST): UTC+02:00 (CEST)
- Postal codes: 30989
- Dialling codes: 05108
- Vehicle registration: H
- Website: www.gehrden.de

Gehrden (German pronunciation: [ˈɡeːɐ̯dn̩]) is a town in the district of Hanover, in Lower Saxony, Germany. It is situated approximately 10 km (6.21 mi) southwest of Hanover and next to the recreation area Deister.

== Notable people ==
- Werner von Siemens (1816–1892), inventor, founder of electrical engineering and industrialist,
- Carl Wilhelm Siemens (1823–1883), industrialist.
- Hans-Joachim Frey (born 1965), theater director
- Maria Schrader (born 1965), actress, screenwriter and director.
- Tim Pritlove (born 1967), eventmanager, media artist and member of Chaos Computer Club
- Marc Bator (born 1972), newsreader at the Tagesschau 2000–2013, since then at Sat.1
- Carolina Bartczak (born 1985), a Canadian actress of Polish descent.

=== Sport ===
- Werner Lueg (1931–2014), athlete, bronze medallist in the 1500m at the 1952 Summer Olympics
- Wolfgang Kreißig (born 1970), high jumper
- Grischa Niermann (born 1975), racing cyclist
- Christian Pampel (born 1979), volleyball national player
- Nils Pfingsten-Reddig (born 1982), footnaller, played 517 games
- Kristin Demann (born 1993), footballer, played over 170 games and 20 for Germany women
- Grant-Leon Ranos (born 2003), Armenian football player
