= Tim Pritlove =

Tim Francis Pritlove
- Pritlove in 2010
- Born: 25 November 1967 (age 58); Gehrden
- Other names: Theodor Prinz der Tapfere (Hüter der Flamme des Herzens, Haus der Apostel der Eris)
- Known for: podcasting, Project Blinkenlights, management of the Chaos Communication Congress

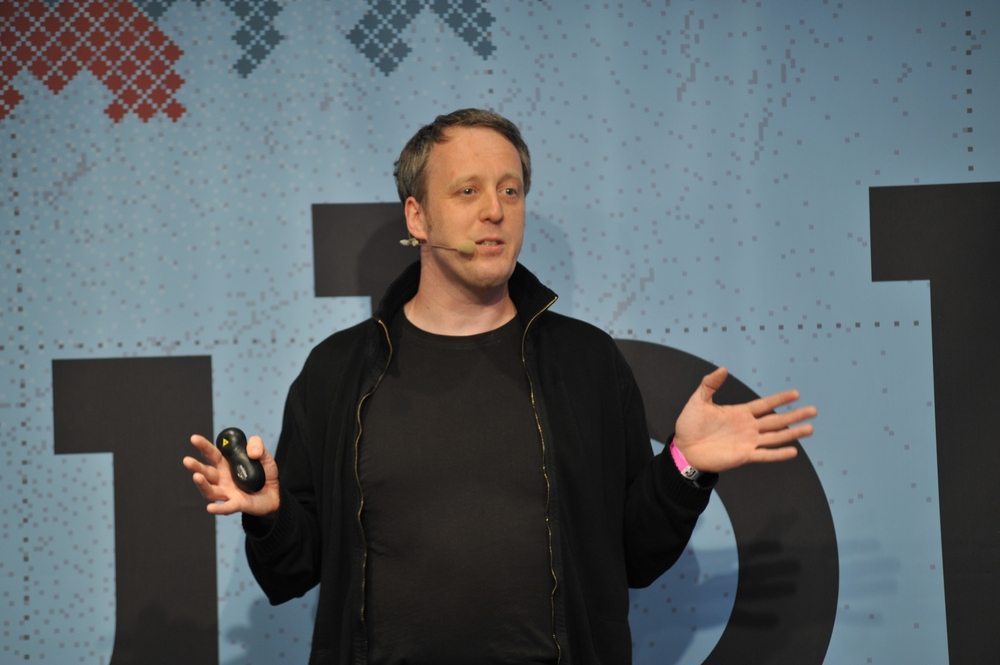
Pritlove 2011

Tim Pritlove (full name: Tim Francis Pritlove; born 25 November 1967 in Gehrden, Germany) is a British/German podcaster, media artist and Discordian. He lives and works in Berlin.

In 1988, Pritlove began studying computer science at the University of Hildesheim but dropped out later that same year. Before and after his studies, he worked as a programmer using microprocessors such as the RCA 1802 and MOS Technology 6502, as well as platforms like the Commodore 64, programming in languages such as C and BASIC.

From 1998 to 2005, he was the main organizer of the Chaos Communication Congress and the Chaos Communication Camps. Also, until 2006, he was in charge as managing director of the “Chaos Computer Club Veranstaltungsgesellschaft mbH.” He also played a central role in the Chaos Computer Club, where he is a member.

As a Discordian, Pritlove appeared under the pseudonym Theodor Prinz der Tapfere, Hüter der Flamme des Herzens, Haus der Apostel der Eris (translation: “Theodore, Prince of the Brave, Keeper of the Flame of the Heart, House of the Apostles of Eris”). With this name, he blogged until March 2008 on the MobileMacs blog. Since the beginning of April 2008, he has been blogging at MobileMacs by his civic name.

== Media-art ==
At the beginning of the 1990s Pritlove belonged to the developers of the first interactive, telephone based communication platform Die Villa. He is coordinator and co-developer of Project Blinkenlights. In 1996 he founded the first T-shirt label of the hacker culture named interhemd nerdwear. From 2000 to 2005 he was artistic-scientific assistant of Joachim Sauter at the Institut für zeitbasierte Medien of the Berlin University of the Arts.

== Podcasting ==
Pritlove was involved with Chaosradio, a radio show of the Chaos Computer Club Berlin, since the beginning in 1995. Until the year 2019, Chaosradio used to run with Fritz, a program of Rundfunk Berlin-Brandenburg, and since then is solely published as a podcast. In 2005, Pritlove spun off Chaosradio Express (which was renamed into CRE: Technik, Kultur, Gesellschaft in December 2011), Chaosradio Express International and Chaos TV, as separate podcasts. Additionally he publishes an own weblog called The Lunatic Fringe.

He is involved in the production of several, predominantly German podcasts, as well as the English podcast “Newz of the World”. His podcasts are often focused on technology, culture or society. Most of his podcasts are released independently and financed through donations from listeners. Some podcasts are created in collaboration with or commissioned by institutions, for example, “Forschergeist” with the German National Association for the Foundation of Science. The podcast “Raumzeit” was initiated in 2010 jointly with the European Space Agency and the German Aerospace Center. Since 2015, Pritlove has been producing this podcast entirely on his own.

In 2014 Pritlove was one of the most popular German bloggers.

== Personal life ==
Born British citizen, motivated by Brexit, Pritlove applied for German citizenship, which was granted on 17 October 2018.
