= Sigint (disambiguation) =

Sigint or SIGINT may refer to:

- Signals intelligence, intelligence-gathering by interception of signals
- SIGINT (POSIX), a Unix signal
- Sigint (character), from Metal Gear Solid 3
- SIGINT (conference), a conference on the technical and social aspects of digital society
