= GPN =

GPN may refer to:

- Garden Point Airport, on Melville Island, Australia
- Gerbang Pembayaran Nasional, an Indonesian interbank network
- Global Payments
- Global production network
- Green Party of the Netherlands
- The ISO 639-3 identifier for the Tayap language
- Gulaschprogrammiernacht, annual hacker convention in Karlsruhe
