= HGG =

HGG may refer to:

- Hackerspace Global Grid
- Haggerston railway station, in London
- Harlech Grits Group, a lithostratigraphic group in Wales
- Heilig-Geist-Gymnasium, a Christian secondary school located in Broich in Würselen, Germany.
- Henderson Group, a British investment management company
- hhgregg, an American retailer
- The Hitchhiker's Guide to the Galaxy, a comedy science fiction series created by Douglas Adams
- Hyperbolic geometric graph
- Home for the Golden Gays, a Filipino LGBT non-profit organization established in 1975
