= Schlandnet =

Schlandnet is a slightly ironic political buzzword used to convey the idea that any Internet traffic between two locations in Germany should be routed only through connection points within Germany's borders. The idea has been discussed by different politicians, media and IT experts as a possible reaction to the Snowden leaks. The idea has mainly been circulated on Twitter as #schlandnet and within the Chaos Computer Club.
