= Chaosdorf =

Chaos Computer Club Düsseldorf / Chaosdorf e.V.

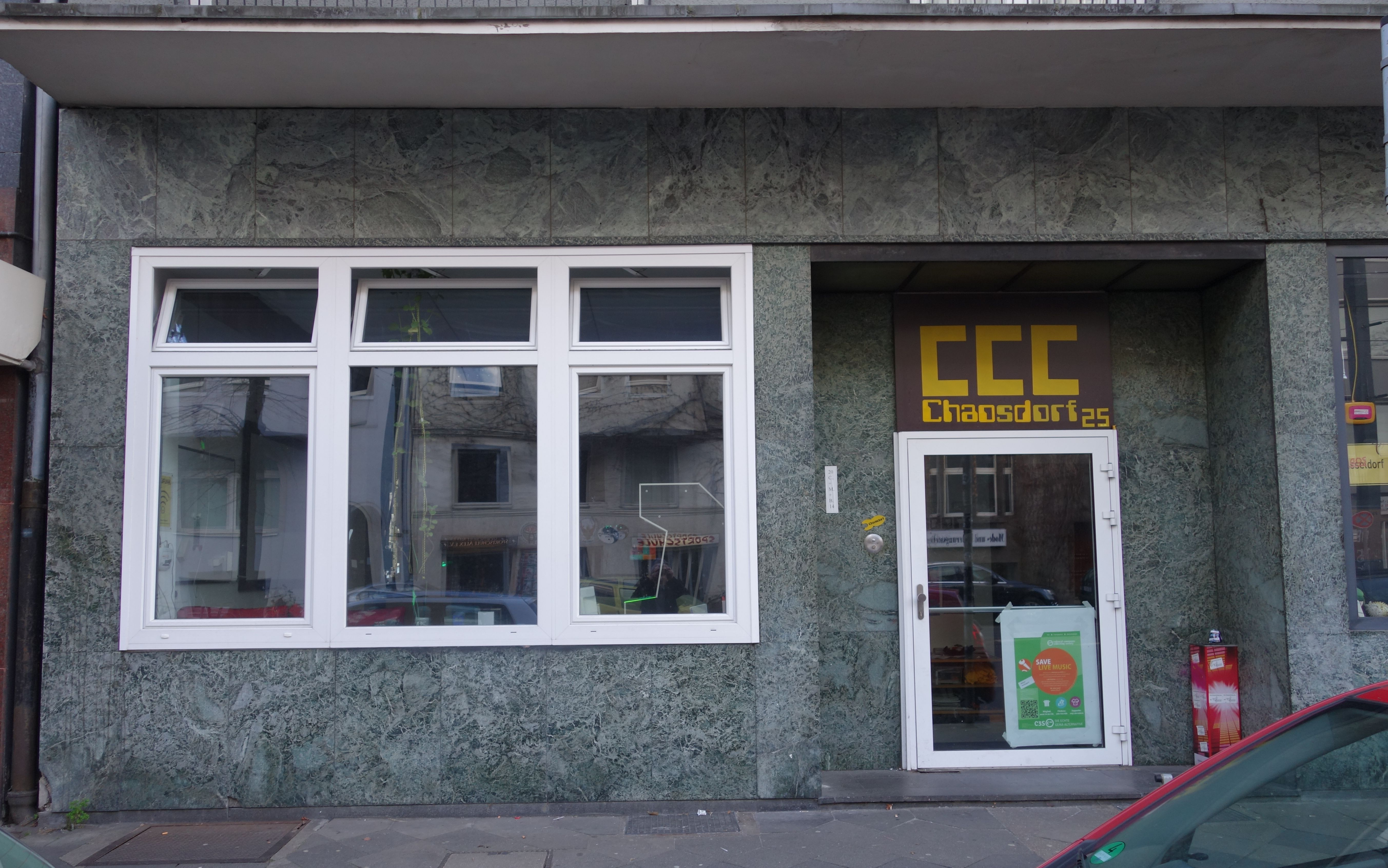
- Chaosdorf logo and storefront of the former hackerspace on Hüttenstraße
- Founded: 24 April 2001; 25 years ago
- Purpose: Hacking, DIY
- Location: Sonnenstraße 58, Düsseldorf, Germany
- Coordinates: 51.2126267°N 6.7996479°E
- Method: CryptoParties, software development, street protests
- Members: 108
- Affiliations: Chaos Computer Club, Free Software Foundation Europe, Freifunk Rheinland e.V.
- Website: chaosdorf.de

Chaosdorf is a hackerspace operated by non-profit association (Eingetragener Verein) Chaos Computer Club Düsseldorf / Chaosdorf e.V. in the city of Düsseldorf, Germany. It is Düsseldorf’s Chaos Computer Club chapter.

== The association ==
Chaosdorf is operated by non-profit association Chaos Computer Club Düsseldorf / Chaosdorf e.V. and is mainly financed by member fees and donations. A membership in the association is not required to take part in the mostly cost-free workshops and meetings.

The purpose of the association is the creation of an environment for adult education, modern information privacy and socializing between communities.

== History ==
=== Founding ===
Chaosdorf was founded 24 April 2001. Their first rooms were located on Fürstenwall 232 in Düsseldorf-Friedrichstadt.

=== Second hackerspace ===
Sketch of the old Chaosdorf hackerspace on Hüttenstraße

After a lengthy renovation process Chaosdorf moved into a new building on Hüttenstrasse that used to be a "rather sketchy nightclub" in 2011.

The space itself consists of four rooms: A large lounge-cum-hackerspace, a kitchen, a media room, and a workshop. Chaosdorf owns different kinds of equipment to help members fulfilling their projects and offering services.

=== Nationwide awareness ===
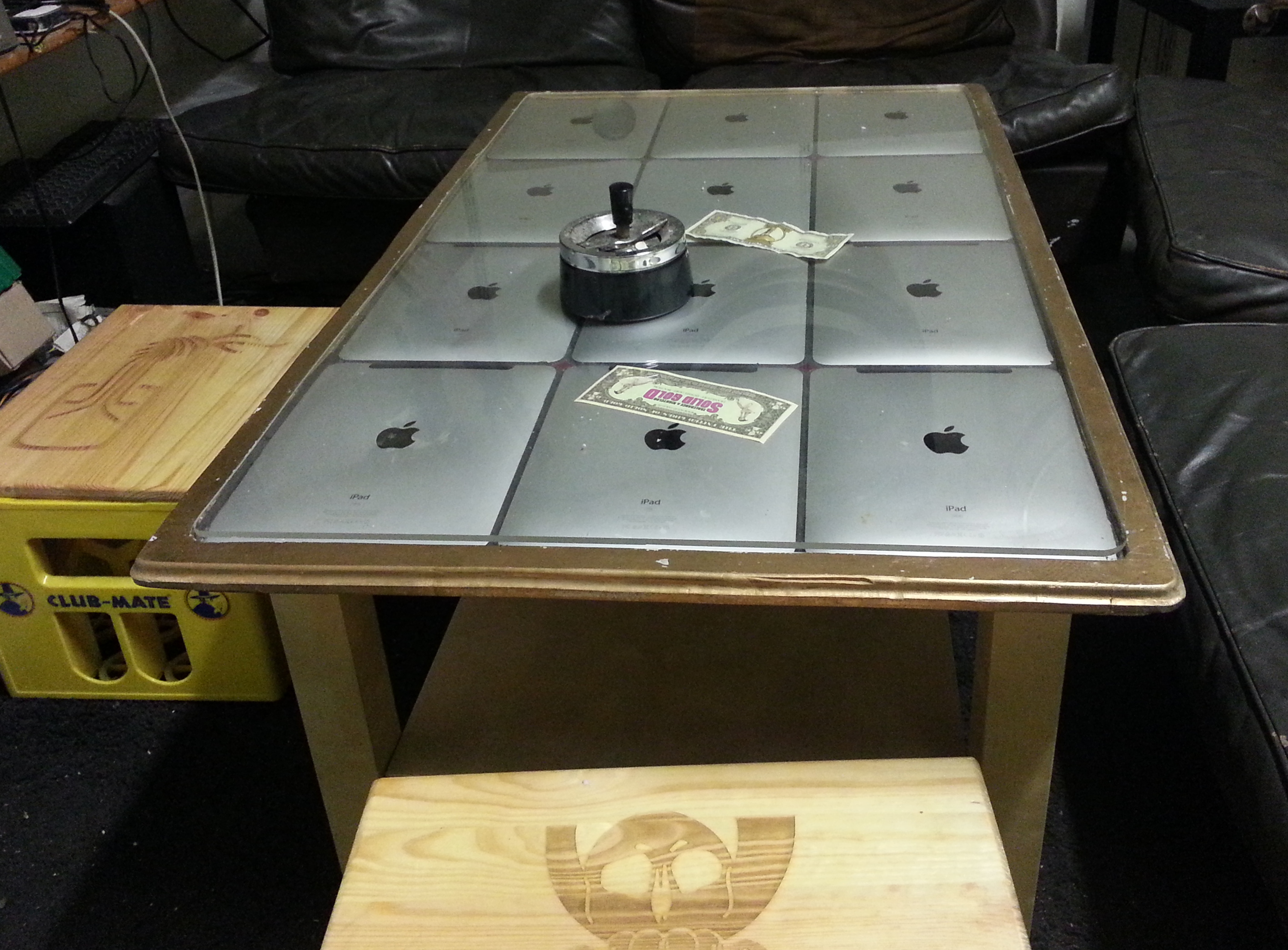
A tile table made of iPads.

Chaosdorf is known in the German hackerspace culture for organizing Easterhegg 2002 – the first Easterhegg event outside of Hamburg – and OpenChaos: Hackerspace Design Patterns.

It gained mainstream attention in 2013 for organizing a large-scale street protest in Cologne demanding net neutrality after Deutsche Telekom announced to throttle web traffic.

Chaosdorf gained even more widespread mainstream attention after Der Spiegel published a story about its non-commercial in-house OwnBeer microbrewery.

On 30 December 2013 Rheinische Post, a major German regional daily newspaper, published a two page feature about Chaosdorf.

The hackerspace also supports friendly organizations such as Forum Freies Theater, Free Software Foundation Europe, Freifunk Rheinland e.V., and Sub-Etha by providing room for meetings, storage for hardware, or infrastructure.

=== International awareness ===
In October 2013 members of the technology online magazine Hack a Day published a story about Chaosdorf – their first visit in a German hackerspace.

=== New hackerspace "Chaosdorf 4.0" ===
In 2020 Chaosdorf moved to a bigger building on Sonnenstrasse. The new space provides the following rooms: class room, electronic lab, wet lab, hackerspace, kitchen/lounge, and fab lab (Werkstatt).

== Renowned members ==
Among the members of Chaosdorf are a few renowned people such as former member of parliament North Rhine-Westphalia Marc Olejak of the Pirate Party Germany, visual artist Rachid Maazouz and the security researchers Ilias Morad, Alexander Karl, and Martin Dessauer.
