= Ernest Martin (theatre) =

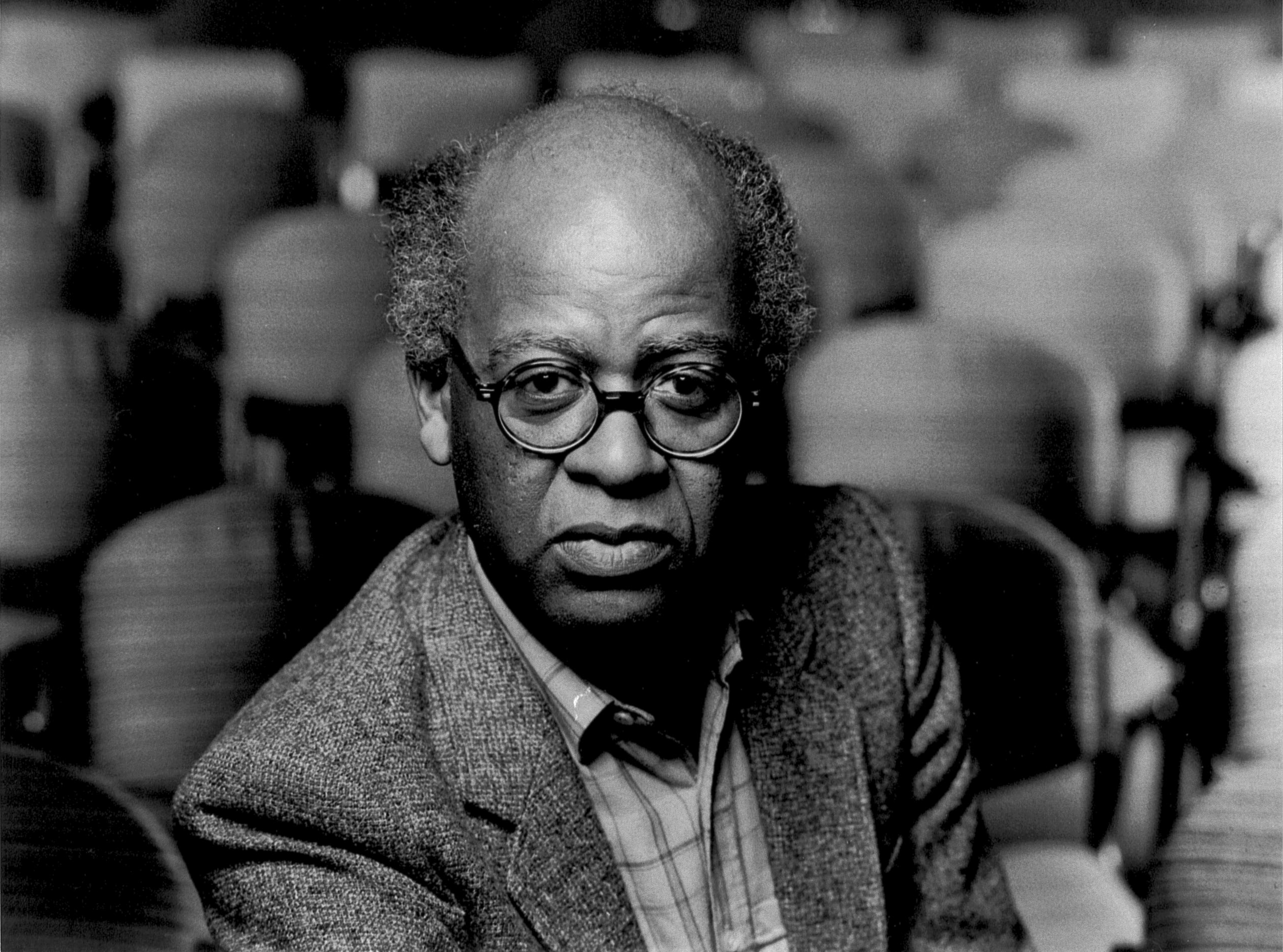
- Ernest Martin as theatre manager of the Junges Theater in der Altstadt
- Born: Ernest Martin; February 23, 1932; New York City, US
- Occupations: theatre director, theatre manager and actor

Ernest Martin (born February 23, 1932) is an American theatre director, theatre manager and actor, who lives in Düsseldorf, Germany, where he wanted to develop new forms of theatre. In Düsseldorf, apart from traditional theatre, he built, led and directed amateur theatre - groups, which were keen on experimenting.

== Biography ==
When Ernest Martin finished his schooltime at the Boys High School in Brooklyn, he studied psychology at the state university City College of New York from 1950 to 1953. Then from 1954 to 1955 a study of theatre studies at the drama school of the University of Washington in Seattle followed. After his study, Ernest Martin made a one-year apprenticeship at Joseph Papp's East 6th Street Theater. In this time he was inspired by the theatre group The Living Theatre, whose „unconventional approach to the modern theatre provoked a strong resonance at that time in America.“ Already during his study, Ernest Martin gathered first experiences as director at the Off-Broadway. In 1951 he produced the one-act play Reunion, which was written by himself and performed at the Cherry Lane Theatre in New York City. Afterwards he directed several theatre plays such as Six Characters in Search of an Author by Luigi Pirandello or The Skin of Our Teeth by Thornton Wilder, which were also performed at the City College Of New York.

After a trip to Europe in 1960, Ernest Martin decided to live in Germany, where he wanted to use his longtime experiences with improvisational theatre and creative theatre work with amateurs. So, he moved to Germany in 1961 and found the Düsseldorf theatre group Die Bühne in 1964, which was renamed in Die Bühne – Experimentiertheater Düsseldorf in 1968. Ernest Martin directed a lot of theater plays and ran the group until 1987. Especially for their self-written plays, the group gained attention. The German news magazine Der Spiegel compared their work with the Off-Off-Art of Joseph Papp's Public Theater and The Living Theatre.

Ernest Martin co-founded in 1984 the theatre Das junge Theater in der Altstadt in Düsseldorf, whose theatre manager he was until 1998, and which now belongs to the Forum Freies Theater. Then in 1989, he co-founded the theatre Das Seniorentheater in der Altstadt, also located in Düsseldorf. Das Seniorentheater in der Altstadt is an amateur theatre, which in 2014 has 33 members, who are between 60 and 88 years old.

Furthermore, Ernest Martin worked as actor and dancer. For example, in the eighties he appeared in the play Harald und die Boys, which was performed at the Düsseldorfer Schauspielhaus and the Schauspiel Köln, or in Mandela vor Gericht, which was performed at the Theater Basel. He finished his over fifty-year-old theater-career as dancer in the Pina Bausch - dance production Kontakthof für Damen und Herren ab 65, which was performed from 2004 to 2009 in Germany and some European countries, like Italy or France.

Ernest Martin lives in Düsseldorf for over 50 years.

== Work (selection) ==
=== Stage direction ===
- 1965-1987: Stage director of all plays, Die Bühne
- 1998: Brooklyn Memoiren by Neil Simon, theatre Junges Theater in der Altstadt

=== Directorship ===
- 1961-1967: Director of the Theater Studio at the community college Wuppertal
- 1964-1987: Director of the theatre group Die Bühne in Düsseldorf
- 1984-1999: Theatre manager of the theatre Junges Theater in der Altstadt in Düsseldorf

=== Acting ===
- 1985-1986: Performer in the play Master Harald und die Boys, Düsseldorfer Schauspielhaus
- 1987-1988: Performer in the play Master Harald und die Boys, Schauspiel Köln
- 1987-1988: Performer in the play Mandela vor Gericht, Theater Basel

=== Dance ===
- 2004-2009: Dancer in the play Kontakthof für Damen und Herren ab 65, Pina Bausch-dance production

== Awards and nominations ==
1979: Förderpreis (advancement award) der Stadt Düsseldorf for the theater group Die Bühne
