= 1378 (km) =

2010 video game

- Developer(s): Jens M. Stober
- Publisher(s): Jens M. Stober
- Platform(s): Windows
- Release: WW: 10 December 2010
- Genre(s): First-person shooter
- Mode(s): Multiplayer

1378 (km) is a first-person shooter multiplayer video game developed by Jens M. Stober, a student at the Karlsruhe University of Arts and Design. In his game, Stober had reused some code and gameplay principles of "Frontiers", a game by the artist group gold extra, on which he had also worked as a map designer. The title refers to the length in kilometres of the Inner German border between East and West Germany from 1949 to 1990, then known as the "death strip". It allows players, up to 16 people at the same time, to take the role of either East Germans trying to cross the border or East German border guards shooting anyone attempting to do so. The game was scheduled to be officially released on October 3 (the anniversary of German reunification) 2010, but was delayed due to its controversy. The game was released in December 2010 following "a public discussion with distinguished guests" at the Karlsruhe University, and will have an age rating of 18+. The director of the Berlin Wall Foundation, Axel Klausmeier, denounced the game as "tasteless" as well as "a slap in the face of victims' families", and claimed that there was nothing to be learned from the game. On the other hand, Adam Rafinski, a lecturer at the Karlsruhe University who supported the game concept, claimed that it is a serious game not to play just as a pastime and players can take a history lesson from it.
