= Project Blinkenlights =

Light installation in Berlin

Coordinates: 52°31′16.9″N 13°24′58.6″E

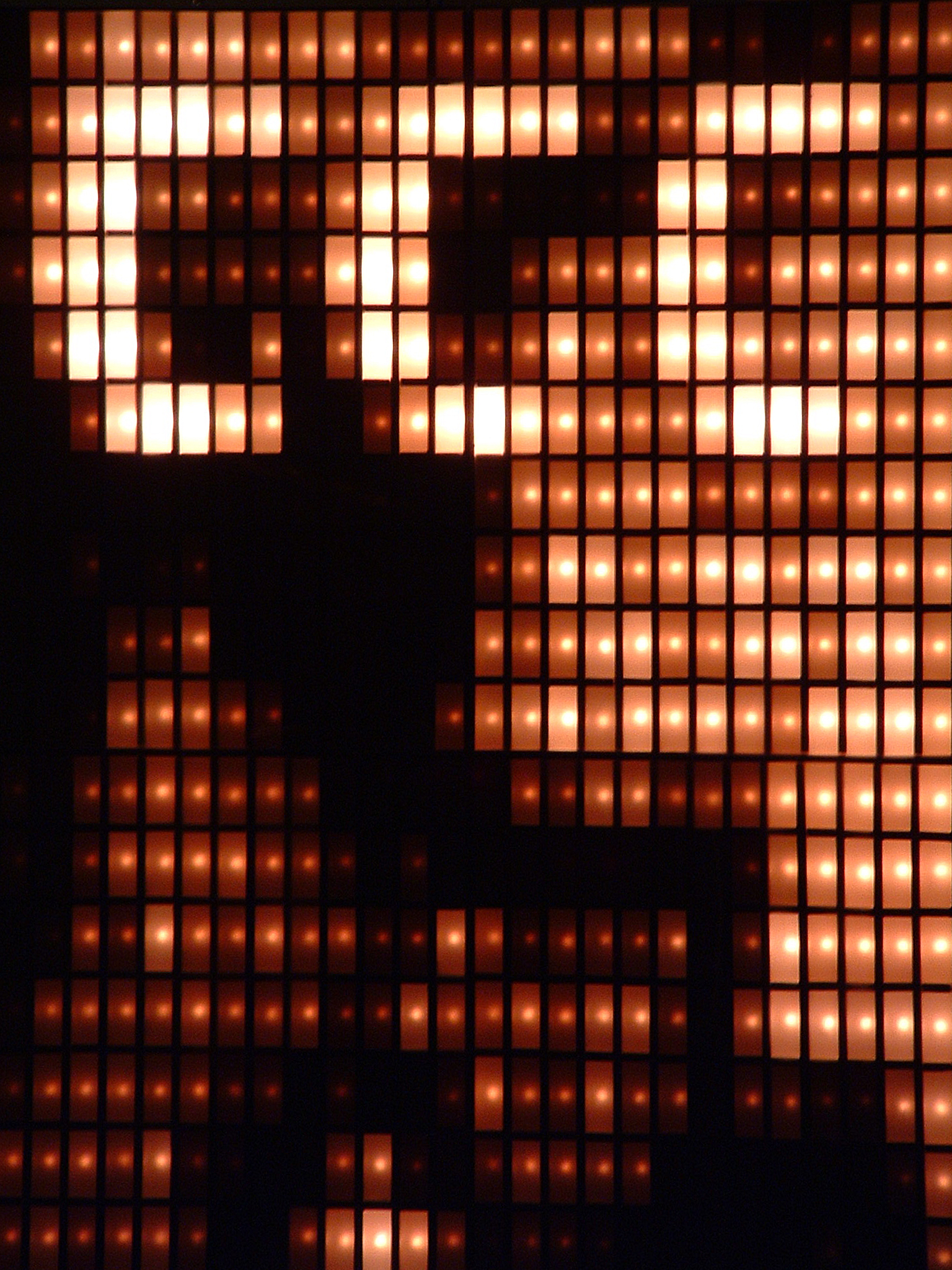
Blinkenlights at the 22nd Chaos Communication Congress in Berlin

Project Blinkenlights was a light installation in the Haus des Lehrers building at the Alexanderplatz in Berlin that transformed the building front into a giant low-resolution monochrome computer screen. The installation was created by the German Chaos Computer Club (CCC) and went online on 11 September 2001 as a celebration of the club's 20th birthday. Some novel uses of the screen are for people to call a number and play Pong via mobile phone or display animations sent in by the public.

Similar installations were created by the CCC for the Bibliothèque nationale de France in Paris in 2002 (called Arcade) and for two towers of the City Hall in Toronto (called Stereoscope). Both installations feature higher resolutions and eight shades of grey.

Similar monochrome and color displays have been done on MIT's Green Building since at least 1993, when the building's 9x17 array of windows displayed a monochrome VU meter for the traditional Fourth of July concert of the Boston Pops orchestra. More recent displays have been in color.

The electrical engineering and computer science students of the Budapest University of Technology and Economics turn their Schönherz Dormitory into a giant display ("the Matrix") at their annual Schönherz Cup competition, where amongst others, teams compete to create the most interesting and funny animations.

A similar display, featuring three colours, is annually created by students of Wrocław University of Technology and the University of Bordeaux, who have released open-source software to create interactive architectural displays.

Independently, an installation displaying the message "FERTiG" (German for "FINISHED") was shown at the completion of the Elbphilharmonie in Hamburg in 2016.

In August 2023 a new Installation was shown on the CCCamp in Mildenberg. It was called Polychrome and used RGBw LED which have been calibrated as Tim Pritlove shown in a Talk about the Project on Aug. 16.

The term "blinkenlights" originates in hacker humor. One of the CCC installations is depicted in the Golden Boy and Miss Kittin video for their song "Rippin Kittin".

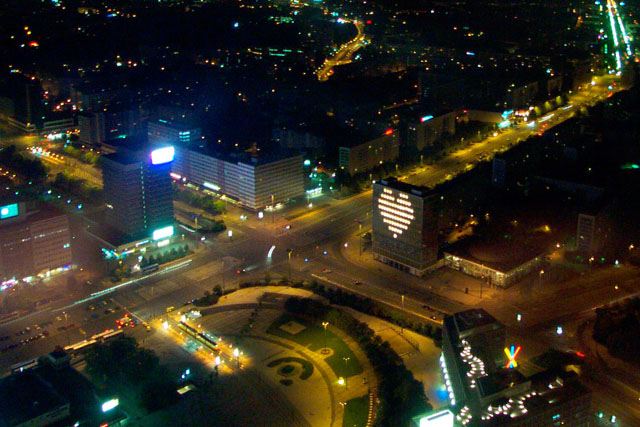
Aerial view of Project Blinkenlights in Berlin

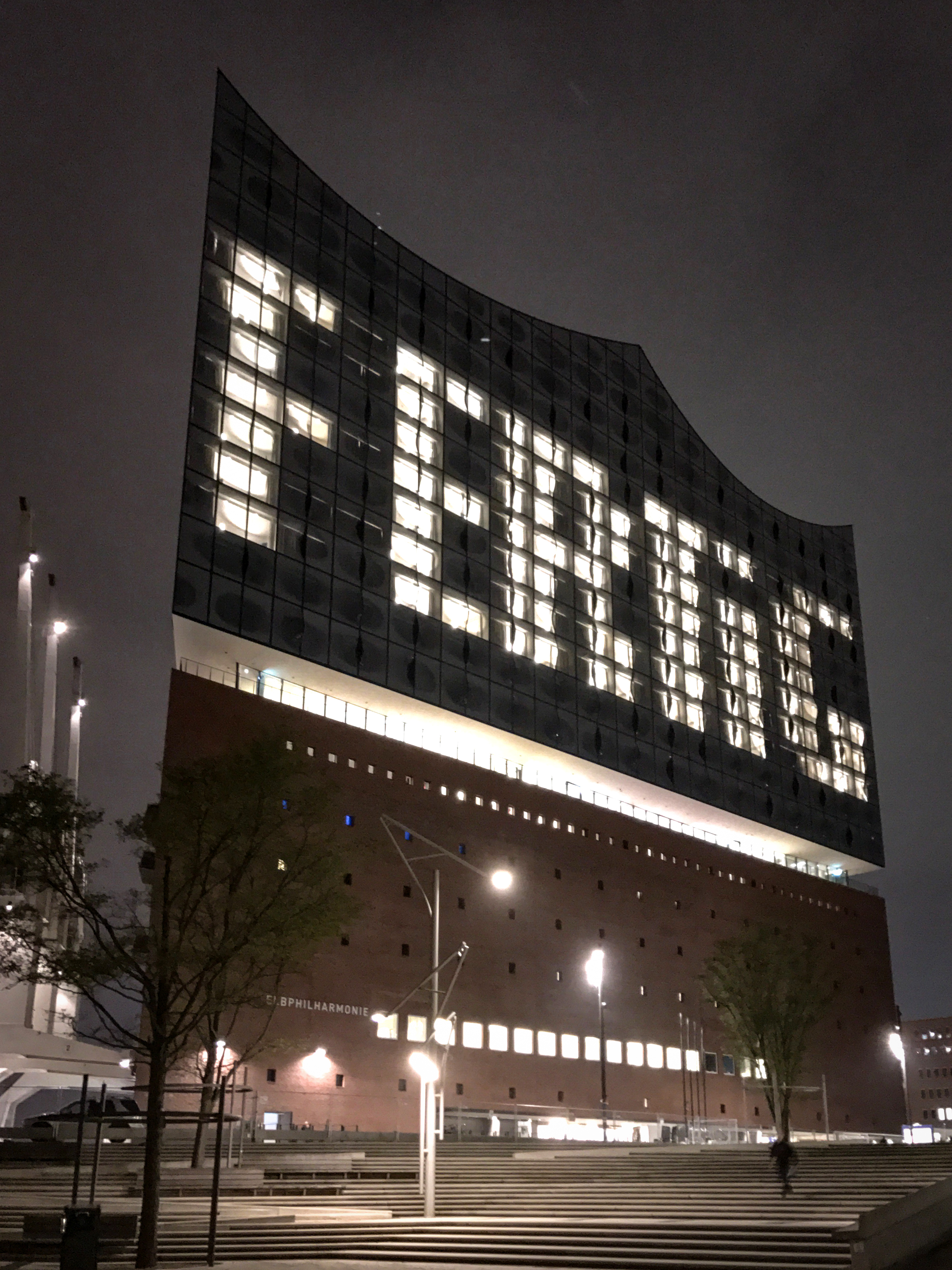
The Elbphilharmonie "Fertig" message

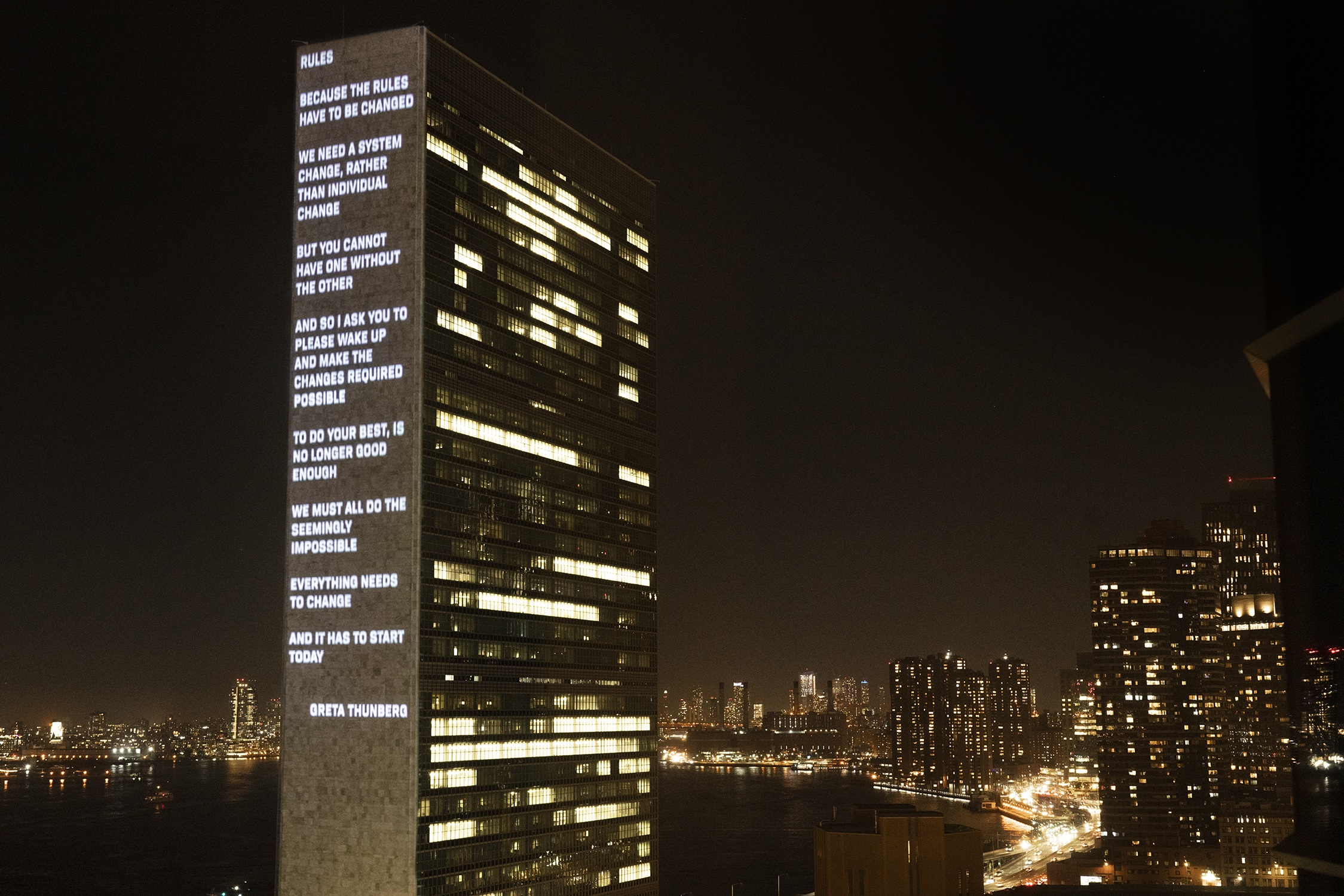
Project Pressure Voices For The Future, 2019
