= Competizione dell' Opera =

The Competizione dell'Opera is an international singing competition formerly based in Germany for singers specializing in Italian opera.

== History ==
In 1996, an international singing competition was founded that focused on Italian operas: "I Cestelli Competizione dell' Opera". Following its two appearances in Hamburg in 1996 and 1998, the competition took place in Dresden from 2001-2010.

The participants of the competition apply with sixth different arias in the qualifying round for semi final of the Italian Opera. The best ten out of the qualifying rounds are able to participate at the final.

Singers who were once finalists and winners of the competition include Marina Mescheriakova, Ashley Holland, Lado Ataneli, Anja Harteros, Carla Maria Izzo, Woo-Kyung Kim, and Latonia Moore. The international jury comprises representatives from the major European opera houses and festivals, artists' managers, famous singers, directors and representatives from the media and from music academies. In 2008 the finals concert took place in the Semperoper in Dresden with the Saarländischen Rundfunks Symphony Orchestra.

Meanwhile the competition moved to Russia (2011, 2016, 2022), leaded by Hans-Joachim Frey.

== Organizers ==
- Hans-Joachim Frey, Cultural Manager

== Sources ==
- Klavierwettbewerb Rubinstein
