= WhiteDate =

White supremacist online dating website

WhiteDate is a white supremacist online dating website. It launched in 2017, and was temporarily shut down in December 2025 by pseudonymous hacker Martha Root, who also breached the site's data.

== History ==
WhiteDate was created in 2017. It was co-founded by Christiane Horn, a German woman from Schleswig-Holstein who operates under the pseudonym "Liv Heide". In 2019, she wrote in the white supremacist publication American Renaissance that she wanted to encourage "woke white people" to "look at humans as animal breeders look at animals."

In 2018, WhiteDate ran an advertisement on Reddit encouraging white women to join the website. A Reddit spokeswoman said the ad had slipped past human reviewers and was taken down the next day. As of April 2018, WhiteDate had a Reddit account, but it stated it had been banned from advertising on Reddit.

In December 2025, pseudonymous hacker Martha Root shut down WhiteDate, together with its affiliated websites WhiteChild (a service for connecting white supremacist sperm and egg donors) and WhiteDeal (a whites-only freelancing website), during the Chaos Communication Congress in Hamburg, Germany. Root also breached the website's user database and published its user profiles online. Root uploaded user profiles that had timestamps and GPS coordinates on a website named okstupid.lol. Prior to shutting down the website, Root used an AI chatbot to obtain as much information as possible from WhiteDate's users.

WhiteDate's administrator said on X in response to the hack, "They publicly delete all my websites while the audience rejoices. This is cyberterrorism." Security consultant Troy Hunt added the leaked dataset from the website to the Have I Been Pwned? database.

== Users ==
Die Zeit journalist Eva Hoffmann has characterised WhiteDate as "Tinder for Nazis". As of December 2025, the website had over 6,500 users, 86% of whom were men. Root said the website's userbase "makes the Smurf village look like a feminist utopia", and that WhiteDate creator Christiane Horn is "trying to build a full-blown fascist white supremacy network disguised as a dating app. She doesn't want journalists snooping around. She warns her users about feds and anti-white infiltrators."

=== Germany ===
Die Zeit reported in October 2025 that the website's German user base included members of the German far-right party Alternative for Germany, anti-abortion activists and neo-Nazis.

=== United Kingdom ===
In January 2026, The Observer reported that the site's users included a former member of the British National Party, members of the neo-Nazi group Patriotic Alternative and a man who ran for office in the Britain First party. Gavin Beales, a Reform UK councillor from Northamptonshire, was also found on the site's user list. Glastonbury councillor Lillith Osborn was suspended from the Conservative Party after she was found in the website's user list.

=== United States and Canada ===
In February 2026, Texas-based news website The Barbed Wire reported that it had identified around 300 WhiteDate users in Texas. That March, CBC News reported that it had matched 200 WhiteDate accounts from the leaked data to real people in Canada, including three members of the Canadian Armed Forces.
