= Jean-Bernard Condat =

Computer hacker

- Born: November 26, 1963 (age 62); France
- Other names: Concombre, Cucumber
- Occupation: Programmer
- Known for: Computer security, Hacking

Jean-Bernard Condat (born November 26, 1963) is a French computer security expert and former hacker who became a consultant to the Directorate of Territorial Surveillance (DST). Using the name concombre (English: cucumber), he achieved status as one of the best-known French hackers in the 1990s.

== Biography ==
Condat was born in 1963 in Béziers, Hérault. He completed the baccalauréat at age 16 before attending the University of Lyon to study musicology, earning his deug.

=== Chaos Computer Club, France ===
It was around 1982 that Condat joined the Directorate of Territorial Surveillance, an intelligence agency within the French National Police, who planted him in strategic positions, such as a sysop for CompuServe. In 1989, he, under instruction from the DST and agent Jean-Luc Delacour, created the Chaos Computer Club France, a fake hacker group posing as a national offshoot of the Chaos Computer Club, with the purpose of investigating and surveilling the French hacker community. The group would also work with the National Gendarmarie. The CCCF had an electronic magazine called Chaos Digest (ChaosD). Between 4 January 1993 and 5 August 1993, seventy-three issues were published (ISSN 1244-4901).

== Bibliography ==
- Condat, Jean-Bernard, ed. (1988). Nombre d'or et musique [Golden Section and Music]. Peter Lang GmbH. ISBN 978-3631403471.

== See also ==
- Chaos Computer Club
- List of hacker groups
