= Haus des Lehrers =

Building in Berlin

Coordinates: 52°31′16.9″N 13°24′58.6″E

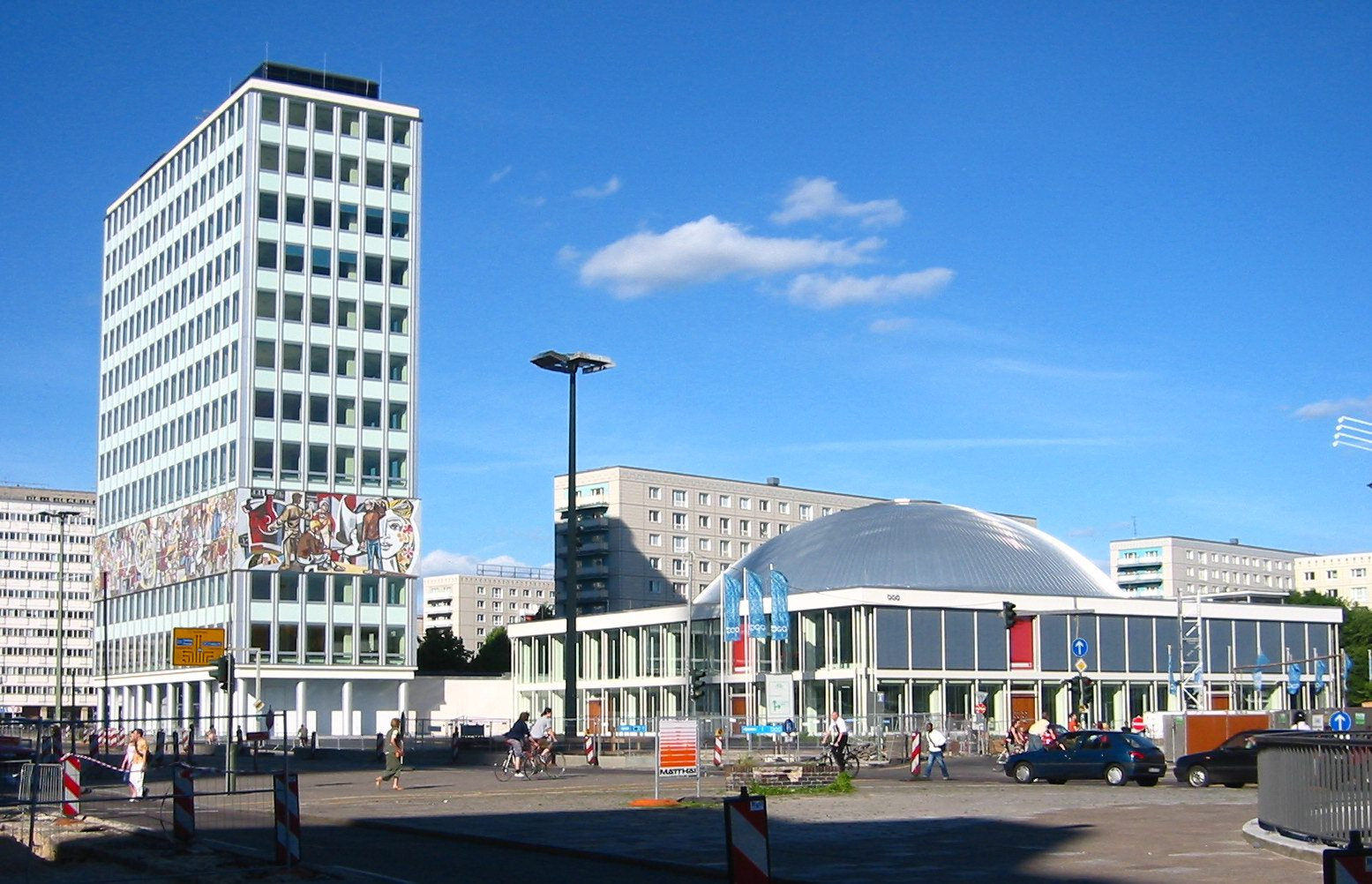
Haus des Lehrers and Berliner Congress Center, 2005.

Haus des Lehrers (German for 'House of the teacher') is a building in Berlin, located near Alexanderplatz, built between 1962 and 1964 under the German Democratic Republic. Its most notable feature is a mural wrapping around the entire building and extending between the second and fifth above-ground floors. Designed in the style of Mexican mural art by artist Walter Womacka, it is titled Unser Leben ('Our Life') and depicts various occupational groups of and aspects of life in the GDR.

Adjacent to the building is a two-story congress hall, known since November 2003 as Berliner Congress Center. Between 2003 and 2011, the annual Chaos Communication Congress was hosted there. For the 20th anniversary of the Chaos Computer Club in 2001, a light installation Project Blinkenlights was installed in Haus des Lehrers.

== See also ==
- Project Blinkenlights
