= Hans-Joachim Frey =

German opera singer (born 1965)

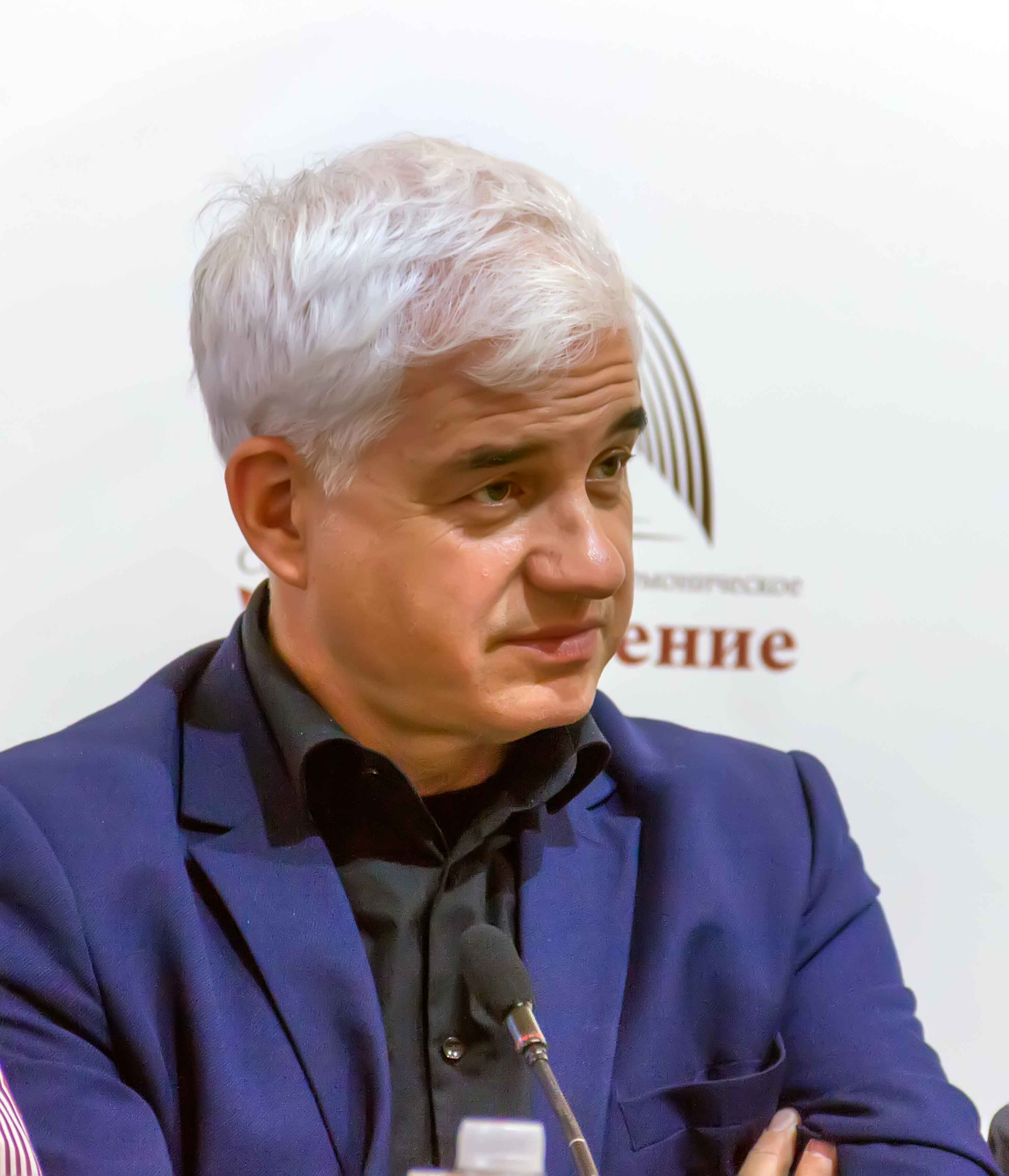
- Citizenship: Russian
- Occupations: Artistic Director of Operations and Director of Opera (from 2003) General Director, Theater Bremen Artistic Director, Talent and Success Foundation
- Honours: Dresden Opera Ball

Hans-Joachim Frey (born 10 June 1965, in Gehrden, Lower Saxony) is a German cultural manager. From 1997 to 2007, he was Artistic Director of Operations and Director of Opera (from 2003) at the Semperoper in Dresden from 2007 to 2010 and general director at the Theater Bremen. In January 2013 he was responsible in the European Capital of Culture in Linz as a board director and artistic director of Liva, where he was also on the Bruckner House, the International Bruckner Festival and the clouds of sound.

Since 2006, he is also a founder and the first Chairman and Artistic Director of the Semper Opernball in Dresden. Moreover, he is often culturally engaged, such as in vocal and instrumental competitions as well as in cultural studies organizations as well as artistic director of the Dresden Opera Ball. Frey is the nephew of Armin Mueller-Stahl. He attended school in the capital of Lower Saxony, Hanover. From the seventh to the twentieth year he received piano lessons and at the age of eight he joined the Hanover Boys' Choir at, where he served for ten years. In addition, he took six years of teaching in the church organ, which he finished with the completion of the C-organist examination. In 1984, he graduated from high school in his hometown. Subsequently, he did his military service from where he was employed as a driver, secretary and organist of the military vicar.

After this he started at the University of Music and Theatre in Hamburg trained as an opera singer, alternating between the voice types of tenor and baritone. At the urging of his father, for whom the profession of opera singer was too uncertain, he took courses of study as a musical theater director. By the end of 1989 he started a collaboration with the Hamburg State Opera as a study project, the operetta Die Fledermaus by Johann Strauss, for which he won numerous sponsors. He subsequently enrolled in the new university course for management culture. During his studies he worked as an opera singer at various theaters and concerts. He was also assistant director, including Hamburg and Stockholm, and brought five more of its own productions at studio theaters in Rostock and Detmold on the stage. In 1990 he received from Götz Friedrich he graduated as a director (musical theater), and three years later the diploma as a cultural manager at Rough Hermann and Peter Ruzicka.

== Early theater work ==
After graduating Frey worked since 1993 as Artistic Director of Operations at the Thuringian State Theatre in Eisenach in 1995 and then held the same position at the Theater Bremen.

== Time in Dresden ==
In May 1997, Frey was operating as Artistic Director of the Saxon State Opera Dresden at the Semperoper. There he ran an internationalization policy and the singer gave performances by well-known directors such as Willi Decker, Sebastian Baumgarten, Nemirova, Claus Guth, Nikolaus Lehnhoff, Günter Krämer and Peter Konwitschny. He also stepped up its cooperation with the Dresden Staatskapelle and thus also with conductors such as Giuseppe Sinopoli, Semyon Bychkov, Sir Colin Davis, Fabio Luisi, Sebastian Weigle, Marc Albrecht, Daniel Harding, Christian Thielemann, Manfred Honneck and Daniele Gatti.

When in August 2002 as a result of the exceptionally strong flood of the Elbe the Semperoper had to be closed, he initiated during this period together with Harry Kupfer staging Carmen - a version by Georges Bizet in the premises of the Transparent Factory on the edge of the Great Park. The piece was presented there for a month before the headquarters of the State Opera 9 November 2002 with the ballet Illusions - like Swan Lake, the new season 2002/2003 could be included. In summer 2003, he was named for opera director. Under his leadership, perpetual interruption was the occasion of the 800th anniversary of the city in early 2006 after 67 years Semper Opera Ball reintroduced. January 2013 2600 guests took part in the first event, while 4000 spectators on the video screens pursued transmitted event at the Opera House forecourt.

In April 2007, he resigned from his post at the Semperoper in order to take over the general directorship of the theater Bremen. However, he is still the artistic director of the Opera Ball and first chairman of the Dresden Semper Opera Ball V. The ball was played in 2013 under his leadership the 8th Time.

== Director in Bremen ==
At Theater Bremen Frey followed Klaus Pierwoß ab. In his term of office continuing process should be the reorganization of the theater as a holistic brand culture across the stage also. In the course of this concept initially was a modernization of the logo; also a greater involvement with the business and other cultural institutions should be allowed. During the directorship Frey Theater Bremen was a collaboration with the Culture Church St. Stephani, which includes, among other so-called theater sermons on certain pieces. Rank in the foyer of the theater was the place at the Goethe Theatre Galerie Bremen established in the far including works by GABO, Armin Mueller-Stahl, Anna Thalbach, Christian Ludwig Attersee and Ai Wei Wei were presented. For these innovations, the theater received several prizes and awards. He developed the concept of the 2,500 seater floating stage on the former site of Bremen AG Weser River and in the summer for a week to attend the opera was seen.

At the beginning of his term Frey had the production of the musical Marie Antoinette by Michael Kunze and Sylvester Levay announced. This was however listed from January and May 2009 in the musical theater funded by the Bremen Theatre Bremen. The cost of production amounted to 5.8 million euros. But instead of the expected 120,000 spectators visited only 90,000 then the ideas, there was a loss of 2.5 million euros.

Due to political disputes about the musical project Marie Antoinette he asked in August 2009 to the early termination of his contract at Bremen Theatre 31 July 2010.

== In Russia ==
After working in Bremen Frey staged for the Mariinsky Theatre in Saint Petersburg on the occasion of the 150th anniversary of 2010, the opera gala. At the Moscow Bolshoi Theatre took place in September 2011, the international singing competition Competizione dell 'Opera under Frey's line instead. Thus, this song competition was first held outside of Germany. This competition was then in 2012 at the Bolshoi Theatre in Minsk / Belarus instead.

At the Boris Pokrovsky Moscow Chamber Opera he has 2011 opera Zar und Zimmermann first fully staged in Russia, sung in German with spoken dialogue language and in Russian. In 2011 there was a big gala for the 50th anniversary of the twinning between Dresden and St. Petersburg under the baton of Vladimir Jurowski and directed by Frey and organization at the Mikhaylovsky Theatre (en place). In 2012 he staged in October in the cities of Ulan-Ude and Irkutsk go the opera The Flying Dutchman by Richard Wagner on Lake Baikal. Was first brought to the stage an opera in the original language of a foreign director beyond the Urals. In December 2013 at the International Opera Forum at the State Academic Bolshoi Theatre of Belarus in Minsk also the opera The Flying Dutchman was brought on stage.

== Other activities ==
Frey leads different teaching assignments for Cultural Management at the University of Music and Theatre in Hamburg, the University of the Arts Bremen and the University of Music Franz Liszt Weimar through. In 1996, he exclaimed as founder and director of the international singing competition Competizione dell 'Opera of the Italian opera to life, which is intended to promote young talent. The competition is now established worldwide and has been performed 12 times.

In 2003 he founded together with a small group of other cultural officials, the International Forum for Culture and Economics (also Tiberius Forum). Under the auspices of the Forum Freys busy 2003 Piano Competition "Anton G. Rubinstein" again. In 2009 the piano competition for the fourth time with the final concert at the Semperoper took place.

He was director of the 2004 competition held by Tiberius Forum International Composition Competition for the Transparent Factory. He was also a member of the advisory board of the Hanover boys choir.

He is a member of the boards of trustees of the Kreuzchor, the Richard Strauss Festival and the Daetz Foundation (see Daetz Centre), with Werder Bremen and Rotary International. Additionally he was a member of the jury at numerous art competitions since 2005 and is also patron of the Musikverein Dippoldiswalde.

From 2011 to the end of 2012 he was Managing Director of LaValse GmbH Berlin. In 2011 he became a visiting professor at Seoul Arts College in Korea called. From 2013 to 2017 he was the new Artistic Director and Executive Director of Liva in Linz. He was responsible for the Bruckner House, the International Bruckner Festival, the clouds of sound, Posthof and was on the board of Ars Electronica.

== Controversy ==
According to the verdict of Federal Court of Justice, Naomi Campbell did not have to be paid 55,930 euros for her appearance at the SemperOpernball in connection with the awarding of the St. Georgs Order 2015. According to Hans-Joachim Frey, he had canceled the engagement on the previous day.
