= Gold extra =

Artist collective from Salzburg, Austria

gold extra is an artistic collective from Salzburg, Austria, that was founded in 1998. The group's work is focused on various disciplines such as performance, theatre, game design and visual art.

In their projects gold extra's artists chose their genre according to whatever the project and its concept demand. They transgress into unknown territories and allow themselves the liberty to constantly explore new trajectories in the arts. This led to the creation of work in extreme variations, from Commedia-dell’arte styled street theatre to computer games, from robotic theatre to audio compilations, from public picnics to dance performances with electrodes. Another characteristic of the group is their strong interest to interact with the public and involve them into the creation and performance of the work. Productions of gold extra therefore address the relationship of society with media, technology and politics.

gold extra started in 1998 as a theatre company, but swiftly moved into other fields. They became a multidisciplinary network and platform for artistic production. In this spirit they produced various collaborative pieces and events in Linz, Salzburg and Vienna, very often for public and urban spaces and always in cooperation with regional artists and activists. A good example for this period would be the exhibition and performance installation Komm nach Hause (Come home) in the Künstlerhaus Salzburg in 2002. A bus station was reconstructed inside of the exhibition space and housed a multi-layered and playful exchange of interior and exterior spaces and events. This and other projects used already a tremendous amount of technology and real-time media, a tendency to develop further in the upcoming years.

In 2004 gold extra participated in the EU-project "Trichtlinnburg", for which they produced Love City and Survival Camp. They were invited to participate at the symposium of the Osterfestspiele in Salzburg, to which they contributed the humorous performance lecture Cosi.Mixtur. This marked the beginning of a new phase of work for gold extra. With some older members retiring and new faces becoming part of gold extra, the group also started to work on a more international scale. They produced pieces for the Salzburger Mozartjahr in 2006, became Salzburg's artistic ambassador at "Kosmos Österreich" in Germany and were supported by the European Cultural Foundation to make their computer game Frontiers. Their productions were shown at international festivals, museums and venues, such as Ars Electronica (A), Zentrum für Kunst und Medientechnologie (ZKM) Karlsruhe (D), Festival der Regionen (A), Garage X Vienna (A), Digital Arts Week Zürich (CH), Casa Encendida Madrid (E), Belef Festival Belgrad (RS), Forum Freies Theater Düsseldorf (D), Games for Change Festival NY (USA), Theaterkapelle Berlin (D), The Arches Glasgow (UK), DansWerkplaats Amsterdam (NL), K3 Hamburg (D), brut Koproduktionshaus Wien (A), DOX Centre for Contemporary Art Prague (CZ), Tanzhouse_Festival Salzburg (A) and the No Border Camp 2007 (UA).

Their most prominent project of the recent years was the computer game Frontiers, which was selected as "mod of the month" by the German magazin GEE in 2009 and received extensive media coverage in the German speaking region.

The current members of gold extra are Reinhold Bidner, Tobias Hammerle, Georg Hobmeier, Doris Prlić, Sonja Prlić and Karl Zechenter.

== Projects (selection) ==
=== Frontiers (2008–2012) ===
Frontiers is a computer game addressing the perilous journey of immigrants from subsaharan Afrika into "The Fortress" Europe. The game is distributed for free via the internet and aims at young computer game players that normally concern themselves little with politics. Frontiers was presented and exhibited in various locations in Germany, Spain, Portugal, Austria, France, the US and others. In 2011 the game was presented at the "Games for Change Conference" in New York. It is part of the ZKM's permanent exhibition in Karlsruhe. The team consists of Tobias Hammerle, Georg Hobmeier, Sonja Prlić and Karl Zechenter with the support and contribution of Jens Stober, Martina Brandmayr and others.

=== Area (since 2008) ===
Area is a series of public performance events that started with the piece "area" in 2008, continued with "fast forward and its melancholic rewind" in 2010, "Labyrinth" and "area/global" in 2011 and was taken to other levels, lands and art forms in productions such as "The Engagement", "99 ways to die in Scotland" and "Rites of Suburbia". These events have taken place in various cities on various continents, such as Paris, Frankfurt, Berlin, Salzburg, Porto, Buenos Aires, Bangalore, Glasgow, Innsbruck, Freiburg and others. It's a platform for the temporary transformation of urban spaces. (Georg Hobmeier, Tommy Noonan, Deepak Kurki Shivasvami, Mirjam Klebel, a.o.)

=== Black Box (2006–2009) ===
Black Box is a robot performance, in which eight mostly juvenile robots attempt to perform the play Hamlet. The piece was produced in Salzburg for the celebration of Mozart's birthday in 2006 and was performed at various festivals, such as the German-Austrian Theaterfestival in Cologne and the European cultural capital Linz in 2009. The popular Austrian singer Louie Austen contributed with his voice to this production. (Sonja Prlić, Karl Zechenter)

=== Same Time Same Station (2009–2011) ===
The performance Same Time Same Station transplants the French Revolution from the late 18th century straight into the world of internet, YouTube and blogging. The revolutionary Marat and the girondist Charlotte Corday compete with their vlogs for the favour of the public. The piece was co-produced with Argekultur Salzburg for their Open Mind Festival in 2010 and shown again in 2011. (Sonja Prlić, Karl Zechenter with Tobas Hammerle and Reinhold Bidner)

=== Feedback & Disaster series (since 2005) ===
Doris Prlić used the website feedbackanddisaster.net for four thematic exhibitions to which she invited upcoming artists coming from audio, video and multimedia. In correspondence to the online exhibitions she organised various performances, concerts and presentations, f.ex. in the Kunsthaus Graz, quitch Linz and other venues in Rotterdam, Salzburg and Berlin. (Doris Prlić)

=== From Darkness (since 2013) ===
From Darkness is a journey into the heart of Africa. It's a hybrid mix of documentary footage, adventure and 3D game, where the player gets to encounter the turmoils and conflicts that have plagued Eastern Africa since decades. In 2012, the concept for the game was awarded with the media art award of Salzburg.

== Awards ==
The artists of gold extra have received numerous awards, scholarships and stipendia, both as individuals and as a group. This includes the outstanding artist award by the Austrian Ministry for Culture and Arts (2012), the media art award of Salzburg for From Darkness (2012), the production award of the Junges Theater Bremen (2005), the scenography award "Offenbacher Löwe" (2006), the national writer's stipendia of Austria (Karl Zechenter and Sonja Prlić in 2002), the Austrian START-stipendia (Georg Hobmeier, 2011) and the media art award of Salzburg for Reinhold Bidner in 2007.
