= Easterhegg =

Annual hacker meeting

- Genre: Hacker con
- Frequency: Annually
- Inaugurated: 2001
- Previous event: April 18–21, 2025
- Next event: April 3–6, 2026
- Organizer: Chaos Computer Club
- Website: www.easterhegg.eu

Easterhegg (EH) is an annual hacker event by the German Chaos Computer Club. Since 2001 the Easterhegg takes place during the Easter celebrations.

Most participants are from German-speaking countries, with others from the rest of Europe or further afield. The Easterhegg consists mostly of workshops with some lectures, with topics covering the whole spectrum from tech to culture and hackerspaces. Furthermore, Easterhegg is non-commercial and all the workers are volunteers.

== List ==
Year	Location	Motto
2001	Hamburg	Funken und WLAN":
2002	Düsseldorf	./easter -h -egg
2003	Hamburg	The workshop weekend
2004	München	easterhegg 2004
2005	Hamburg	The workshop weekend
2006	Wien	
2007	Hamburg	The workshop weekend
2008	Köln	Follow the white rabbit
2009	Hamburg	the family event
2010	München	Follow the black rabbit
2011	Hamburg	the family event
2012	Basel	
2013	Paderborn	
2014	Stuttgart	Kehrwoche
2015	Braunschweig	We don't kEHr!
2016	Salzburg	Hackfestspiele in Salzburg
2017	Mühlheim a. M.	Ist das Zufall oder kann das weg?
2018	Würzburg	Rabbits & Byterflies
2019	Wien	bun intended
2020	Hamburg	back to root (cancelled)
2020	Online	DiVOC: Hidden Service
2021	Online	DiVOC: Reboot to Respawn
2022	Online	DiVOC: Bridging Bubbles
2023	Hamburg	20 Jahre Easterhegg. Back to root.
2024	Regensburg	Rabbit Prototyping
2025	Hamburg	Unhandled Eggception
2026	Koblenz	The Bunny is a Lie LINK
