= Wau Holland =

German journalist and computer activist (1951–2001)

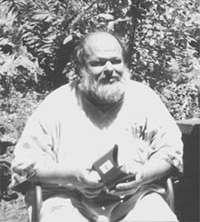
- Wau Holland, c. 2000, in Löhrbach, Germany
- Born: Herwart Holland-Moritz; 20 December 1951; Kassel, West Germany
- Died: 29 July 2001 (aged 49); Bielefeld, Germany
- Known for: Cofounder of the Chaos Computer Club

Herwart Holland-Moritz (20 December 1951 – 29 July 2001), known as Wau Holland, was a German computer security activist and journalist who in 1981 cofounded the Chaos Computer Club (CCC), one of the world's oldest hacking clubs.

After his death in 2001, his friends founded the Wau Holland Foundation (officially established in 2003), with the support of his family to continue his work and uphold his memory.

== Career ==
From 1979 onwards, Holland supported the film historian Hans-Michael Bock with the development of the filmographic database CineGraph - a lexicon for German-language films, which appeared as a loose-leaf collection from 1984. In 1981, Holland co-founded the Chaos Computer Club (CCC).

From 1983 he was a columnist for the Berlin-based Die Tageszeitung, often reporting on the BBS scene and the computer underground. In the same year, he also supervised the phototypesetting of one of the early books created entirely on a computer (Osborne 1).

Holland also co-founded the CCC's hacker magazine Datenschleuder in 1984, which praised the possibilities of global information networks and powerful computers, and included detailed wiring diagrams for building modems cheaply. The then-monopolist telephone company of Germany's Deutsche Bundespost had to approve modems and sold expensive, slow modems of their own. "Connecting a do-it-yourself modem was punished more severely than negligent triggering of a nuclear explosion", Wau Holland famously said about this situation. The telecommunications branch of Deutsche Bundespost was privatized and is now Deutsche Telekom.

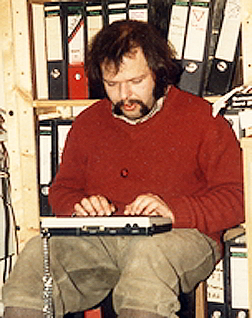
Holland in 1984

Because of Holland's continuing participation in the club, the CCC gained popularity and credibility. He gave speeches on information control for the government and the private sector. Holland fought against copy protection and all forms of censorship and for an open information infrastructure. He compared the censorship demands by some governments to those of the Christian church in the Middle Ages and regarded copy protection as a product defect. In his last years, he spent a lot of his time at a youth centre teaching children both the ethics and the technology of hacking.

== Personal life ==
Holland was born in Kassel, and grew up in Marburg, Hesse. He graduated from the Gymnasium Philippinum secondary school and attended the University of Marburg, though he did not graduate.

Holland was an amateur radio operator and held the call sign DB4FA.

After the Peaceful Revolution, Holland lived in Ilmenau and taught ethics in computer science with Gabriele Schade at the Technical University of Ilmenau (therefore calling himself ironically honorary professor). He was close friends with Bernd Fix and Wolfgang Rudolph. He became an advocate for encrypted messaging.

Holland died in Bielefeld on 29 July 2001 of complications caused by a brain stem stroke from which he suffered in May.

== See also ==
- Phreaking
- Wau Holland Foundation
