= Hackerspace Global Grid =

The Hackerspace Global Grid is aiming at building and establishing a distributed sensor and communication network. It was started in 2011 by Armin Bauer (shackspace), Andreas Horning (Constellation Platform), and Gregor Jehle (shackspace) after a call for participation in the Hackers in Space programme at the Chaos Communication Camp, 2011 to create a global community-driven communication network.

The long-term technical goal is to establish a system for tracking and communicating with amateur satellites in near Earth orbit, but the system is kept open for a variety of sensors, i.e. earthquake detection, radiation or weather data. Currently, the project is in a state where it is possible to receive data from commercial aeroplanes via ADS-B.

A stated but misinterpreted aim of the project is to produce a communication system, 'free from Internet censorship'.

== See also ==
- Deep Space Network
- Hacklab
