= Datenschleuder =

German hacker magazine

- Issue 91
- Editor: Rince
- Former editors: 46halbe, starbug und erdgeist
- Staff writers: Tinoca, smettbo, Kitsune, sharon, hex328, fiveop, clx, vollkorn, myri, kitzune, Thelie, manu, DrUlla, sylvia.
- Categories: Hacking
- Frequency: Irregular, Twice a year is expected
- Publisher: Chaos Computer Club e.V.
- Founder: Herwart Holland Moritz
- Founded: 1984; 42 years ago
- First issue: 1984
- Country: Germany
- Based in: Hamburg
- Language: German
- Website: ds.ccc.de
- ISSN: 0930-1054

Die Datenschleuder. Das wissenschaftliche Fachblatt für Datenreisende, literally translated as The Data Slingshot: The scientific trade journal for data voyagers, is a German hacker magazine that is published at irregular intervals by the Chaos Computer Club (CCC).

Topics include primarily political and technical aspects of the digital world (freedom of information, data privacy (data protection), closed-circuit television, personal privacy (personal rights), cryptography and many more).

Die Datenschleuder was first published in 1984 and also can be subscribed to independently of a membership in the CCC. The founder is Herwart Holland Moritz. All (more than 90) back issues are freely available on the Internet as well. The current print paper format is DIN A5 as per ISO 216. Its editorial process is carried out over the Internet, while the magazine itself is printed centrally and distributed from there.

Issue #92 from March 2008 contained a reproduction of a fingerprint from Wolfgang Schäuble, the interior minister of Germany at the time.

The US phreaking magazine TAP – The Youth International Party Line (YIPL) (founded in 1971) has been described as a model for Datenschleuder.

== See also ==
- Chaos Computer Club
- Chaos Digest (ChaosD)
