= SIGINT (conference) =

- Frequency: Annually
- Inaugurated: 2009
- Most recent: 2013
- Organiser: Chaos Computer Club
- Website: sigint.ccc.de at the Wayback Machine (archived 2013-11-15)

SIGINT was an annual three-day conference on the social and technical aspects of digital society between 2009 and 2013. It was organized by the Chaos Computer Club and held in Cologne, Germany. The conference featured both lectures and workshops on various different topics. It specifically wanted to focus on the social and political aspect of technology and hacker culture. The conference was officially discontinued in January 2014.

The 1C2, hosted by Chaos Cologne, was described as a successor, with more focus on makers, digital arts and hacktivism, but took place only once.

== See also ==
- Chaos Communication Congress
- Chaos Communication Camp
