= Wau Holland Foundation =

Nonprofit foundation in Hamburg, Germany

- Abbreviation: WHS
- Named after: Wau Holland
- Founded: 2003
- Website: wauland.de

The Wau Holland Foundation (German: Wau Holland Stiftung; WHS) is a nonprofit foundation based in Hamburg, Germany.

It was established in 2003 in memory of Wau Holland, co-founder of the Chaos Computer Club (CCC). Loosely connected with the Chaos Computer Club, the foundation aims to preserve and further Holland's ideas in fields such as technology assessment, the history of technology and freedom of information. Specifically, it promotes the use of electronic media for educational purposes. The Vice President of the Wau Holland Foundation is Andy Müller-Maguhn, a friend of Julian Assange.

The Foundation organises its charitable activities into multiple project areas, reflecting issues relevant to Holland's ideas and their mission. As of 2025, project areas include "Campaign against voting computers", "Anonymity networks", "Decentralized communication networks", "Enduring freedom of information", "Alpha-BIT-isation" (media and technology education), "Informational Self-Determination", "Moral courage", and "Free software." Supported projects include the "Archive of Contemporary History of Technology (Hacker archive)", which documents the history of the hacker scene.

== Campaigns ==
=== Voting computers ===
In cooperation with the Chaos Computer Club, the foundation initiated an investigation and public campaign against the use of electronic voting machines, in response to the ES3B voting computers from the Dutch company NEDAP during Germany's 16th Bundestag elections on 18 September 2005. As later summarised by data protection researchers, "The NEDAP voting devices were used in almost 2,000 voting districts for the federal election in 2005 which means that between 2 and 2.5 million voters used the machines for voting."

The campaign's concerns mainly focused around "the manipulability of voting computers." According to a security report by Rop Gonggrijp and Willem-Jan Hengeveld, this DRE (Direct Recording Electronic) voting computer "requires ultimate trust, since it produces an official election outcome that cannot be verified independently." Furthermore, "the problems we found stem from the very design philosophy, we see no quick fixes that could make this device sufficiently secure."

Many such voting machines were subsequently de-certified. In 2009, the German Federal Constitutional Court (German: Bundesverfassungsgericht, or BVerfG) ruled that the Federal Electoral Equipment Ordinance (German: Bundeswahlgeräteverordnung), which governed the use of voting computers, was unconstitutional, on the basis that it did not ensure that the public can understand how such machines work "without any specialist knowledge of the subject." Therefore the machines were not in compliance with "the principle of the public nature of elections" and "subject to the possibility of public scrutiny." However the constitutional court's decision still left the door open for voting computers to be used in future elections, "if the constitutionally required possibility of a reliable accuracy control is ensured."

=== Protection of genetic data ===
As part of their focus on protecting informational self-determination, the foundation sponsored the Berlin-based nonprofit Gen-ethische Netzwerk e.V. (GeN) in the creation of a public advisory brochure on the topic of police access to DNA data during 2019 and 2020. GeN "engage[s] in critical science communication with a focus on the social implications of biotechnological and reproductive technology research." In 2021, GeN investigated the expansion of the police's powers to analyse DNA traces in Switzerland, and the treatment of minorities in forensic DNA databases. GeN supports the conclusion that 'the use of DNA by state authorities.. represents a serious infringement on the fundamental right to informational self-determination of a growing number of people.'

=== Education ===
In an effort to prepare children and young people for the impact of technology on society, Wau Holland co-founded and named the CCC youth educational initiative 'Chaos Macht Schule', where activities may be organised by local chapters of the Club. Other topics include training about the dangers of the internet, social networks, copyright, data protection, and more.

The foundation continues to provide funding for this distributed initiative under their 'Alpha-BIT-isation' project area, in addition to soldering workshops and hands-on electronics hacking through the Dresden-based event Datenspuren.

In July 2022, the intersectional feminist hacker group Haecksen announced a beginner course in Python for 'women and intersex, nonbinary, trans, and agender people' that the foundation had sponsored.

=== Free software ===
The foundation has funded and/or collected donations on behalf of various free software projects, including the GNOME desktop environment, GnuPG, the p≡p foundation (also known as Sequoia-PGP), the Katzenpost mixnet protocol, and Tor network relay/server operators. They have also sponsored events / gatherings for free software developers to meet and collaborate, such as Decentralized Internet Federation Fusion (DIFF).

=== Freedom of information and transparency ===
As part of their focus on moral courage, freedom-of-information and transparency initiatives, the foundation has supported individual "hunted whistle-blowers, journalists and (political) hacktivists." They have criticised the German government's attempts to censor the Open Knowledge Foundation's online platform FragDenStaat (English: Ask the State). The foundation also accepts donations in Europe to support WikiLeaks and previously Julian Assange's defense.

==== Whistleblowing ====
The foundation supports acts of "moral courage" (German: Zivilcourage) in the digital realm, and cooperates with different support funds / networks in this area, especially the Courage Foundation. Since 2024, they are a founding organisation, executive board member, and core funder, along with the Reva and David Logan Foundation and others, of the Berlin-based non-profit Whistleblower Network, which is responsible for overseeing the Ellsberg Whistleblower Award.

==== Relationship to WikiLeaks ====
The foundation processes donations in Europe to support the WikiLeaks organization and (from his arrest in April 2019 until his release in 2024) Julian Assange's defense, including funds raised through the AssangeDAO in 2022.

Between October 2009 when it began accepting donations on WikiLeaks' behalf and December 2010, the foundation collected over $1.9 million USD. On 4 December 2010, PayPal turned off donations in response to the foundation's connection to WikiLeaks, alleging that the account was being used for "activities that encourage, promote, facilitate or instruct others to engage in illegal activity." On 8 December 2010 the foundation released a press statement, saying it has filed legal action against PayPal for blocking its account and for libel due to PayPal's allegations of "illegal activity."

In October 2022, the foundation sponsored a multi-week exhibition in Berlin, titled "NoisyLeaks! The Art of Exposing Secrets." With international contributions from artists, technologists, journalists, researchers, filmmakers and activists, including Ai Weiwei and !Mediengruppe Bitnik, the event featured a variety of artistic creations, films, presentations, and workshops related to "the historical and cultural heritage of WikiLeaks," as a retrospective on the impact of their releases.

== Finances ==
As of December 2010, their endowment was about 62,000 €. It also owns land (valued at about 1500 €), currently leased to a public institution.

=== Non-profit status ===
In December 2010, the Wau Holland Foundation got in trouble with authorities for not filing its accounts on time. On October 25, 2012, the Hamburg Tax Office retroactively revoked its non-profit status for 2010 because they decided that "the forwarding of donations to WikiLeaks and/or to the individuals behind the organization" meant the Wau Holland Foundation "did not satisfy the condition for the direct pursuit of tax-advantaged purposes". The Hamburg Tax Office rejected a complaint filed by the Wau Holland Foundation about the decision. Its charitable status was reinstated on 12 December 2012, applied retroactively for 2011 and 2012.

In March 2024, the Wau Holland Foundation announced that its non-profit status for 2020 had been revoked in a letter dated February 26, 2024 and that they would appeal the decision. In June 2024, the Wau Holland Foundation announced that its non-profit status for 2020 had been regained.
