= Chaos Communication Congress =

Annual hacker meeting

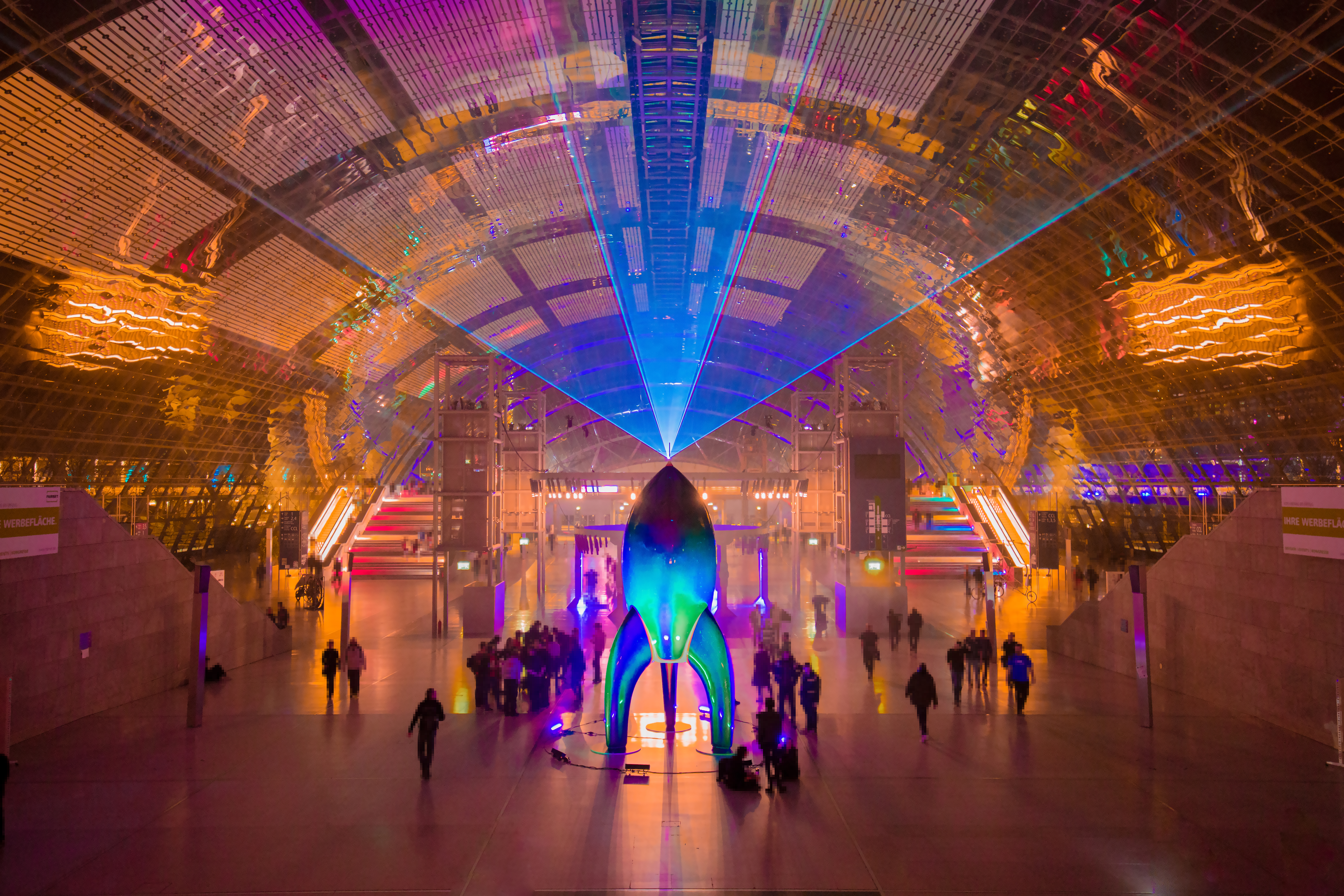
- Main hall of the Leipzig Trade Fair during 34C3
- Genre: Hacker con
- Frequency: Annually, 27–30 December
- Venue: Congress Center Hamburg
- Location: Hamburg
- Country: Germany
- Inaugurated: 1984
- Most recent: 2025 (39C3)
- Next event: 2026 (40C3)
- Organiser: Chaos Computer Club
- Website: events.ccc.de

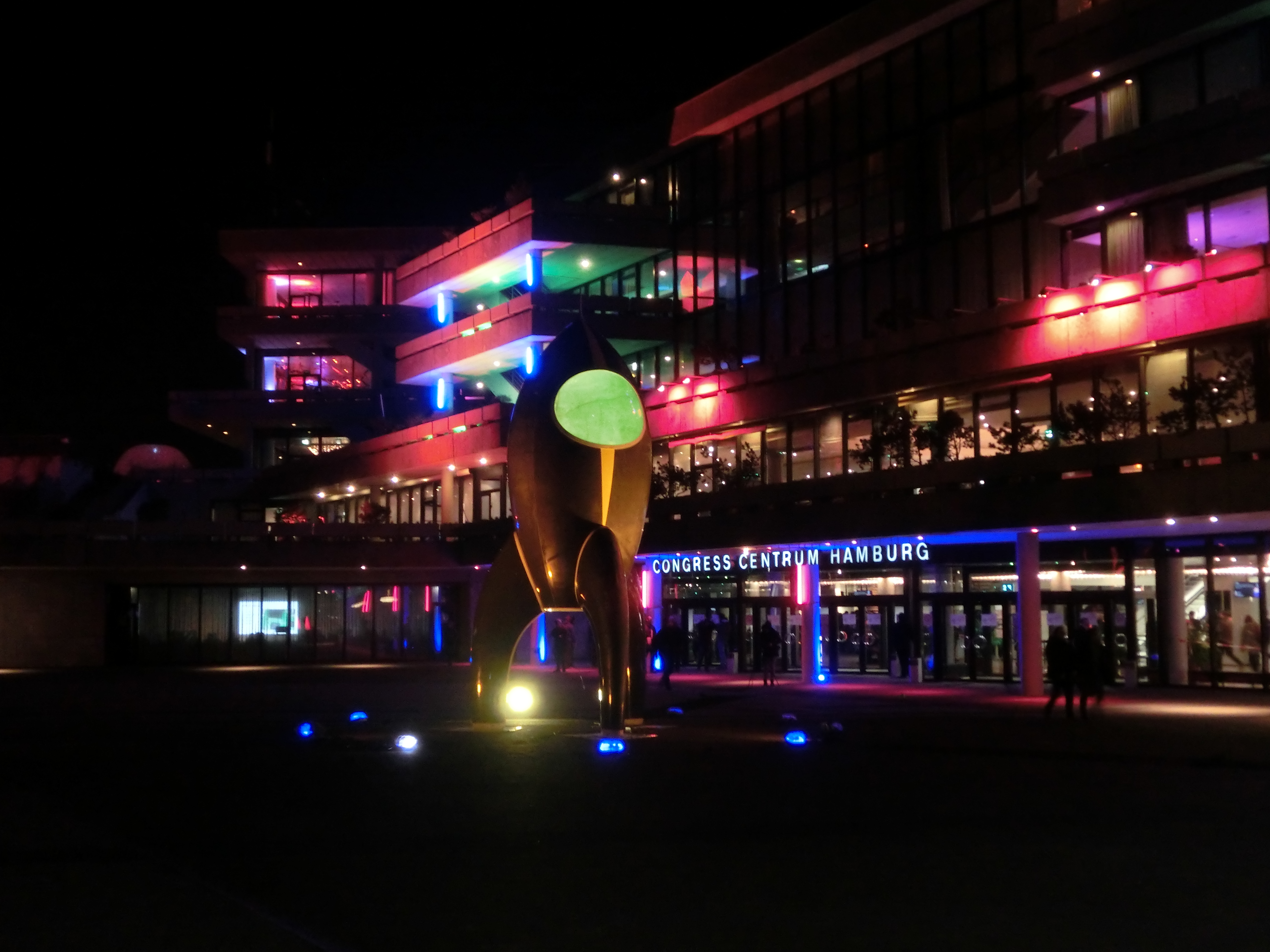
31C3 in Hamburg

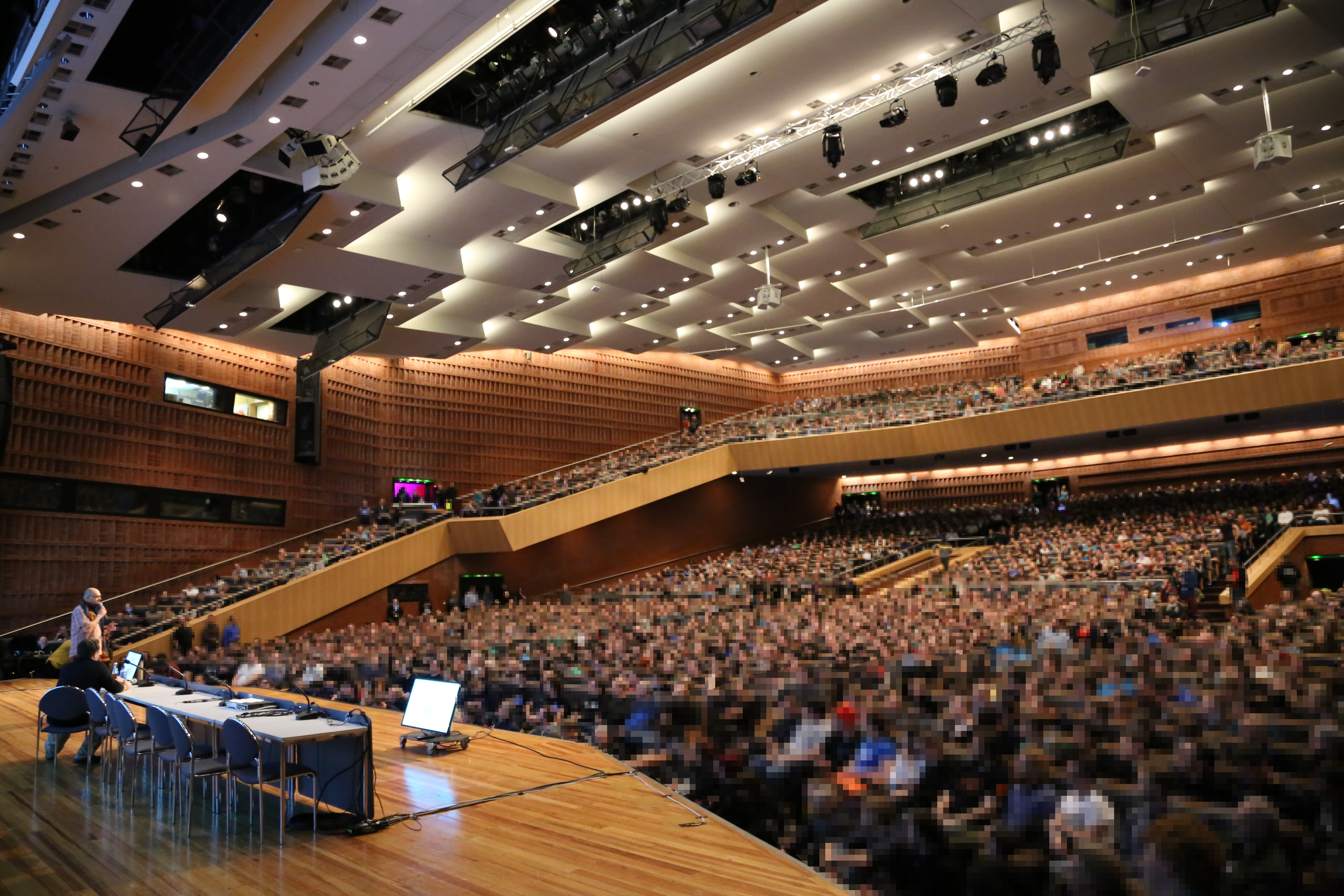
Audience at the keynote of Glenn Greenwald at 30C3

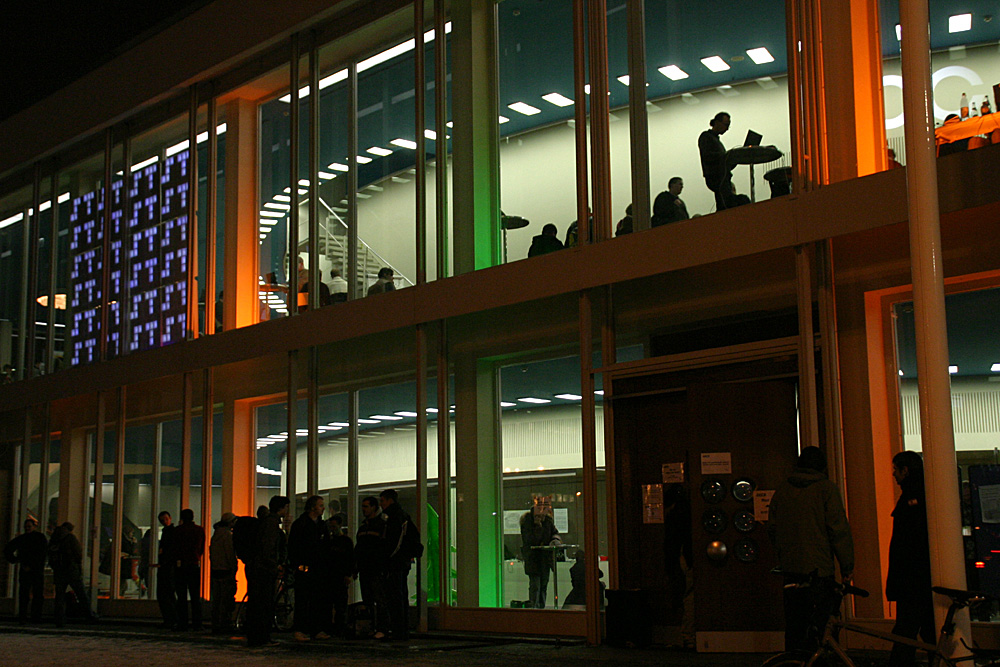
The 22C3 in December 2005

The Chaos Communication Congress is an annual hacker conference organized by the Chaos Computer Club. The congress features a variety of lectures and workshops on technical and political issues related to security, cryptography, privacy and online freedom of speech. It has taken place regularly at the end of the year since 1984, with the current date and duration (27–30 December) established in 2005. It is considered one of the largest events of its kind, alongside DEF CON in Las Vegas.

== History ==
The congress is held in Germany. It started in 1984 in Hamburg, moved to Berlin in 1998, and back to Hamburg in 2012, having exceeded the capacity of the Berlin venue with more than 4500 attendees. Since then, it attracts an increasing number of people: around 6600 attendees in 2012, over 13000 in 2015, and more than 15000 in 2017. From 2017 to 2019, it took place at the Trade Fair Grounds in Leipzig, since the Hamburg venue (CCH) was closed for renovation in 2017 and the existing space was not enough for the growing congress. The congress moved back to Hamburg in 2023, after the renovation of CCH was finished.

A large range of speakers are featured. The event is organized by volunteers called Chaos Angels. The non-members entry fee for four days was €100 in 2016, and was raised to €120 in 2018 to include a public transport ticket for the Leipzig area.

An important part of the congress are the assemblies, semi-open spaces with clusters of tables and internet connections for groups and individuals to collaborate and socialize in projects, workshops and hands-on talks. These assembly spaces, introduced at the 2012 meeting, combine the hack center project space and distributed group spaces of former years.

From 1997 to 2004 the congress also hosted the annual German Lockpicking Championships. 2005 was the first year the Congress lasted four days instead of three and lacked the German Lockpicking Championships.

2020 was the first year where the Congress did not take place at a physical location due to the COVID-19 pandemic, giving way to the first Remote Chaos Experience (rC3).

The Chaos Computer Club announced to return to the now newly renovated Congress Center Hamburg for the 37th edition of the Chaos Communication Congress. The announcement confirms the usual date of 27–30 December, notably omitting the year it will be held. On 18 October 2022, they confirmed that the congress will indeed not be held in 2022. On 6 October 2023, the CCC announced that 37C3 will take place again on the usual dates in 2023.

In the December 2025 conference, pseudonymous hacker Martha Root shut down WhiteDate, a white supremacist dating website, together with its affiliated websites WhiteChild (a service for connecting white supremacist sperm and egg donors) and WhiteDeal (a whites-only freelancing website). Root also breached WhiteDate's user database and published its user profiles online.

=== Timeline ===
Year	Motto	Short name	Visitors	Venue location
1984	"CCC'84 nach Orion'64"	—N/a	—N/a	Eidelstedter Bürgerhaus in Hamburg, Germany
1985	"Du Darfst"	—N/a	—N/a	Eidelstedter Bürgerhaus in Hamburg, Germany
1986	"Damit Sie auch morgen noch kraftvoll zubyten können"	—N/a	—N/a	Eidelstedter Bürgerhaus in Hamburg, Germany
1987	"Offene Netze – Jetzt!"	—N/a	—N/a	Eidelstedter Bürgerhaus in Hamburg, Germany
1988	"ich glaub' es hackt"	—N/a	—N/a	Eidelstedter Bürgerhaus in Hamburg, Germany
1989	"Offene Grenzen: Cocomed zuhauf"	—N/a	—N/a	Eidelstedter Bürgerhaus in Hamburg, Germany
1990	(No motto)	—N/a	—N/a	Eidelstedter Bürgerhaus in Hamburg, Germany
1991	"Per Anhalter durch die Netze"	—N/a	—N/a	Eidelstedter Bürgerhaus in Hamburg, Germany
1992	"Es liegt was in der Luft"	—N/a	—N/a	Eidelstedter Bürgerhaus in Hamburg, Germany
1993	"Ten years after Orwell"	—N/a	—N/a	Eidelstedter Bürgerhaus in Hamburg, Germany
1994	"Internet im Kinderzimmer – Big business is watching you?!"	—N/a	—N/a	Bikini-Haus in Berlin, Germany
1995	"Pretty Good Piracy – verdaten und verkauft"	—N/a	—N/a	Eidelstedter Bürgerhaus in Hamburg, Germany
1996	"Der futurologische Congress – Leben nach der Internetdepression"	—N/a	—N/a	Eidelstedter Bürgerhaus in Hamburg, Germany
1997	"Nichts ist wahr. Alles ist erlaubt."	—N/a	—N/a	Eidelstedter Bürgerhaus in Hamburg, Germany
1998	"All Rights Reversed"	—N/a	2300	Haus am Köllnischen Park in Berlin, Germany
1999	(No motto)	16C3	—N/a	Haus am Köllnischen Park in Berlin, Germany
2000	"Explicit Lyrics"	17C3	—N/a	Haus am Köllnischen Park in Berlin, Germany
2001	"Hacking Is Not A Crime"	18C3	—N/a	Haus am Köllnischen Park in Berlin, Germany
2002	"Out Of Order"	19C3	3000	Haus am Köllnischen Park in Berlin, Germany
2003	"Not A Number"	20C3; NaN	2500	Berliner Congress Center in Berlin, Germany
2004	"The Usual Suspects"	21C3	3500	Berliner Congress Center in Berlin, Germany
2005	"Private Investigations"	22C3	3000	Berliner Congress Center in Berlin, Germany
2006	"Who can you trust?"	23C3	4200	Berliner Congress Center in Berlin, Germany
2007	"Volldampf voraus!"	24C3	4013	Berliner Congress Center in Berlin, Germany
2008	"Nothing To Hide!"	25C3	4200	Berliner Congress Center in Berlin, Germany
2009	"Here Be Dragons"	26C3	9000 (including streaming viewers, unlike all other numbers in this table)	Berliner Congress Center in Berlin, Germany
2010	"We come in peace"	27C3	4000	Berliner Congress Center in Berlin, Germany
2011	"Behind enemy lines"	28C3	3000	Berliner Congress Center in Berlin, Germany
2012	"Not my department"	29C3	6500	Congress Center Hamburg in Hamburg, Germany
2013	(No motto) (Note: In the opening talk of the 30C3 (2013), Tim Pritlove stated that there was no motto because everyone was speechless after what happened that year: the Snowden revelations.)	30C3	9000	Congress Center Hamburg in Hamburg, Germany
2014	"A New Dawn"	31C3	12000	Congress Center Hamburg in Hamburg, Germany
2015	"Gated Communities"	32C3	13000	Congress Center Hamburg in Hamburg, Germany
2016	"Works for me"	33C3	12000	Congress Center Hamburg in Hamburg, Germany
2017	"tuwat"	34C3	15000	Leipziger Messe in Leipzig, Germany
2018	"Refreshing memories"	35C3	16000	Leipziger Messe in Leipzig, Germany
2019	"Resource Exhaustion"	36C3	17000	Leipziger Messe in Leipzig, Germany
2020	"remote Chaos Experience"	rC3	—N/a	Online
2021	"NOWHERE"	rC3 2021	—N/a	Online
2022	Cancelled due to effects of the COVID-19 pandemic			
2023	"Unlocked"	37C3	14500	Congress Center Hamburg in Hamburg, Germany
2024	"Illegal Instructions"	38C3	15000	Congress Center Hamburg in Hamburg, Germany
2025	"Power Cycles"	39C3	16000	Congress Center Hamburg in Hamburg, Germany
2026	"Model Citizens"	40C3		Messehallen in Hamburg, Germany

== See also ==
- Chaos Communication Camp
- DEF CON
- SIGINT
