= Gulaschprogrammiernacht =

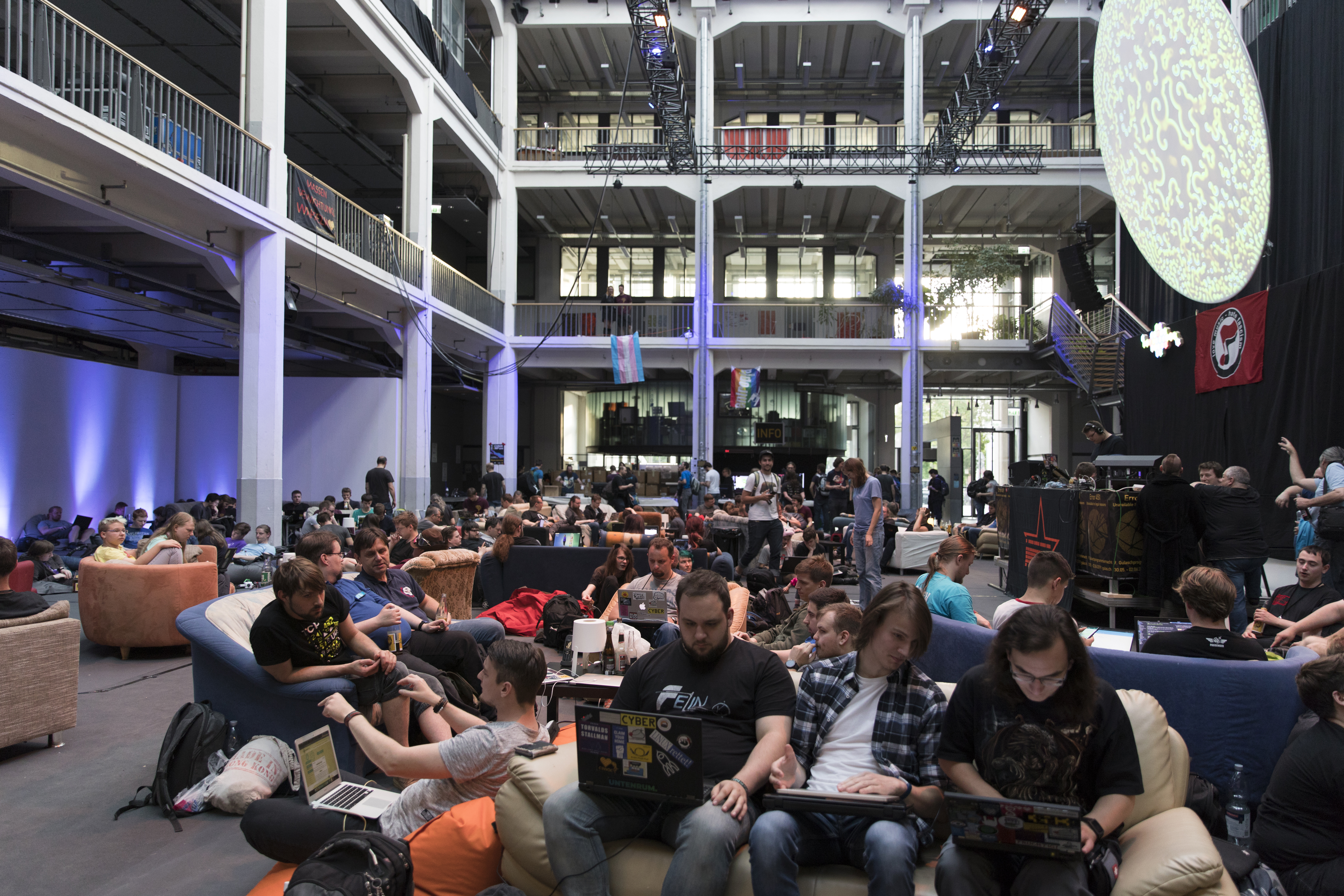
- GPN in 2019
- Duration: 4 days (annually)
- Venue: Karlsruhe University of Arts and Design, ZKM Center for Art and Media Karlsruhe
- Location: Karlsruhe, Germany
- Also known as: GPN
- Type: Hacker convention
- Organised by: Entropia (organization) and other volunteers
- Website: entropia.de/GPN

The Gulaschprogrammiernacht (lit. 'Goulash Programming Night'; GPN) is an annual hacker convention in Karlsruhe, Germany. It is organized by Entropia (organization) since 2002.

== History ==
The first GPN took place in the basement of the Gewerbehof in Karlsruhe. After the young Entropia e.V. threatened to run into financial difficulties, the members organized the first Goulash Programming Night between April 12 and 14, 2002. The name of the event is to be taken literally: During these three days, several dozen young people programmed and ate goulash, mostly at night.

Since 2009, GPN has been held in at the Karlsruhe University of Arts and Design (HfG). Since 2014, the rooms of the neighboring ZKM Center for Art and Media Karlsruhe have also been used.

GPN editions 9 and 10 both took place in 2010 due to a planning error. Since the planned premises were not available on the intended date, the 9th GPN was celebrated in a small circle, while the 10th GPN took place a few weeks later at the originally planned location of the HfG.

In 2017, over 1,000 visitors were counted simultaneously for the first time.

Due to increasing visitor counts, GPN23 in 2025 was the first edition where entry into the HfG and ZKM was limited. Visitors were required to either sign up ahead of time, or acquire a day pass on-site, of which there was a limited supply each day.

== Schedule ==
GPN typically starts on the day of the Feast of Corpus Christi (a public holiday in Baden-Württemberg, where Karlsruhe is located) and lasts from that Thursday until the following Sunday. In this period, the event is open continuously and has many visitors.

The lecture program is announced in the respective "schedule" and includes both challenging specialist lectures and beginner-friendly or humorous contributions, as well as workshops, show contributions, and panel discussions on technical, political, and social topics.

In addition to the lecture program, the GPN offers space in the Hack Center and the adjacent rooms for participants' own projects and activities. Infrastructure in the form of power supply, fast network access, and an internal DECT telephone network is provided. Bringing your own hardware, presenting current projects, and spontaneous activities by participants are an integral part of the program and are explicitly encouraged.

== Culture ==
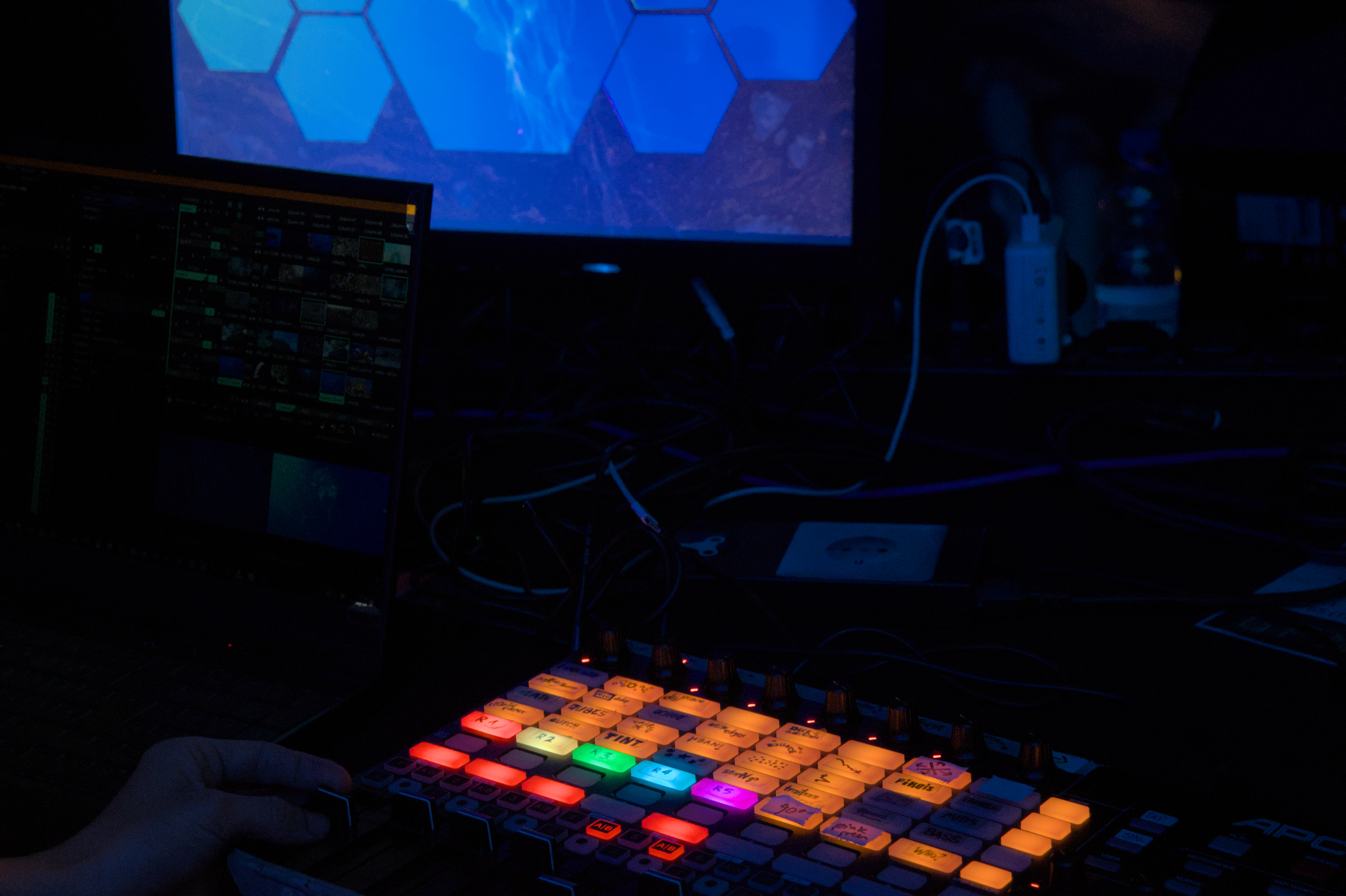
Lounge (DJ performance area) at the GPN22

Every year, smaller and larger artists perform at GPN. Among others, the band Systemabsturz, well-known in the Chaos Computer Club, performed at GPN21.
