= Forum Freies Theater =

German theatre

Coordinates: 51°13′03″N 6°46′50″E

Forum Freies Theater is a theatre in Düsseldorf, North Rhine-Westphalia, Germany.
