= Chaos Computer Club =

Hacker organization based in Germany

- Chaos Computer Club Logo (Chaosknoten aka Datenknoten)
- Formation: 12 September 1981; 45 years ago West Berlin, West Germany
- Type: NGO
- Purpose: Computer security hacking
- Headquarters: Hamburg, Germany
- Location: DACH
- Website: ccc.de/en
- ASN: 50472

The Chaos Computer Club (CCC) is Europe's largest association of hackers, with 7,700 registered members. Founded in 1981, the association is incorporated as an eingetragener Verein in Germany, with local chapters (called Erfa-Kreise) in various cities in Germany and the surrounding countries, particularly where there are German-speaking communities. Since 1985, some chapters in Switzerland have organized an independent sister association called the Chaos Computer Club Schweiz (CCC-CH) instead.

The CCC describes itself as "a galactic community of life forms, independent of age, sex, race or societal orientation, which strives across borders for freedom of information…". In general, the CCC advocates more transparency in government, freedom of information, and the human right to communication. Supporting the principles of the hacker ethic, the club also fights for free universal access to computers and technological infrastructure as well as the use of open-source software. The CCC spreads an entrepreneurial vision refusing capitalist control. It has been characterised as "…one of the most influential digital organisations anywhere, the centre of German digital culture, hacker culture, hacktivism, and the intersection of any discussion of democratic and digital rights".

Members of the CCC have demonstrated and publicized a number of important information security problems. The CCC frequently criticizes new legislation and products with weak information security which endanger citizen rights or the privacy of users. Notable members of the CCC regularly function as expert witnesses for the German constitutional court, organize lawsuits and campaigns, or otherwise influence the political process.

== Activities ==
=== Regular events ===
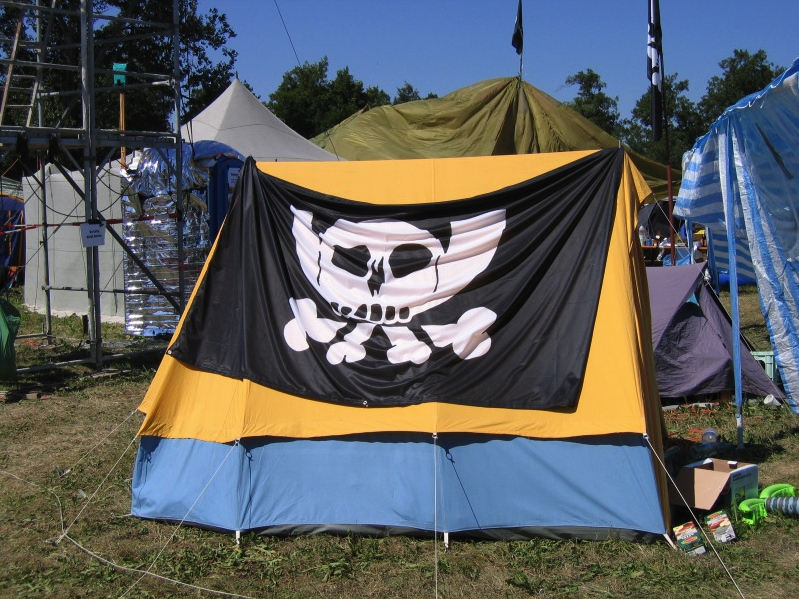
Chaos Communication Camp 2003 near Berlin, featuring the Pesthörnchen aka Datenpirat, a Jolly Roger malapropism to the logo of the former Deutsche Bundespost, the Federal Post of Germany

The CCC hosts the annual Chaos Communication Congress, Europe's biggest hacker gathering. When the event was held in the Hamburg congress center in 2013, it drew 9,000 guests. For the 2016 installment, 11,000 guests were expected, with additional viewers following the event via live streaming.

Every four years, the Chaos Communication Camp is the outdoor alternative for hackers worldwide. The CCC also held, from 2009 to 2013, a yearly conference called SIGINT in Cologne which focused on the impact of digitisation on society. The SIGINT conference was discontinued in 2014. The four-day conference Gulaschprogrammiernacht in Karlsruhe is with more than 1,500 participants the second largest annual event. Another yearly CCC event taking place on the Easter weekend is the Easterhegg, which is more workshop oriented than the other events.

The CCC often uses the c-base station located in Berlin as an event location or as function rooms.

=== Publications and outreach ===
Video

The CCC publishes the irregular magazine Datenschleuder (data slingshot) since 1984. The Berlin chapter produces a monthly radio show called Chaosradio which picks up various technical and political topics in a two-hour talk radio show. The program is aired on a local radio station called Fritz and on the internet. Other programs have emerged in the context of Chaosradio, including radio programs offered by some regional Chaos Groups and the podcast spin-off CRE by Tim Pritlove.

Many of the chapters of CCC participate in the volunteer project Chaos macht Schule which supports teaching in local schools. Its aims are to improve technology and media literacy of pupils, parents, and teachers.

CCC members are present in big tech companies and in administrative instances. One of the spokespersons of the CCC, as of 1986, Andy Müller-Maguhn, was a member of the executive committee of the ICANN (Internet Corporation for Assigned Names and Numbers) between 2000 and 2002.

=== CryptoParty ===
The CCC sensitises and introduces people to the questions of data privacy. Some of its local chapters support or organize so called CryptoParties to introduce people to the basics of practical cryptography and internet anonymity.

== History ==
=== Founding ===
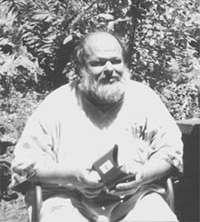
Wau Holland

The CCC was founded in West Berlin on 12 September 1981 at a table which had previously belonged to the Kommune 1 in the rooms of the newspaper Die Tageszeitung by Wau Holland and others in anticipation of the prominent role that information technology would play in the way people live and communicate. The Guardian reports it was founded in response to Deutsche Bundespost having a monopoly on telecoms, and the criminalisation of home computer networking and hacking.

=== BTX-Hack ===
The CCC became world-famous in 1984 when they drew public attention to the security flaws of the German Bildschirmtext computer network by causing it to debit DM 134,000 (equivalent to €131,600 in 2021) in a Hamburg bank in favor of the club. The money was returned the next day in front of the press. Prior to the incident, the system provider had failed to react to proof of the security flaw provided by the CCC, claiming to the public that their system was safe. Bildschirmtext was the biggest commercially available online system targeted at the general public in its region at that time, run and heavily advertised by the German telecommunications agency Deutsche Bundespost which also strove to keep up-to-date alternatives out of the market.

=== Karl Koch ===
In 1987, the CCC was peripherally involved in the first cyberespionage case to make international headlines. A group of German hackers led by Karl Koch, who was loosely affiliated with the CCC, was arrested for breaking into US government and corporate computers, and then selling operating-system source code to the Soviet KGB. This incident was portrayed in the movie 23.

=== GSM-Hack ===
In April 1998, the CCC successfully demonstrated the cloning of a GSM customer card, breaking the COMP128 encryption algorithm used at that time by many GSM SIMs.

=== Project Blinkenlights ===
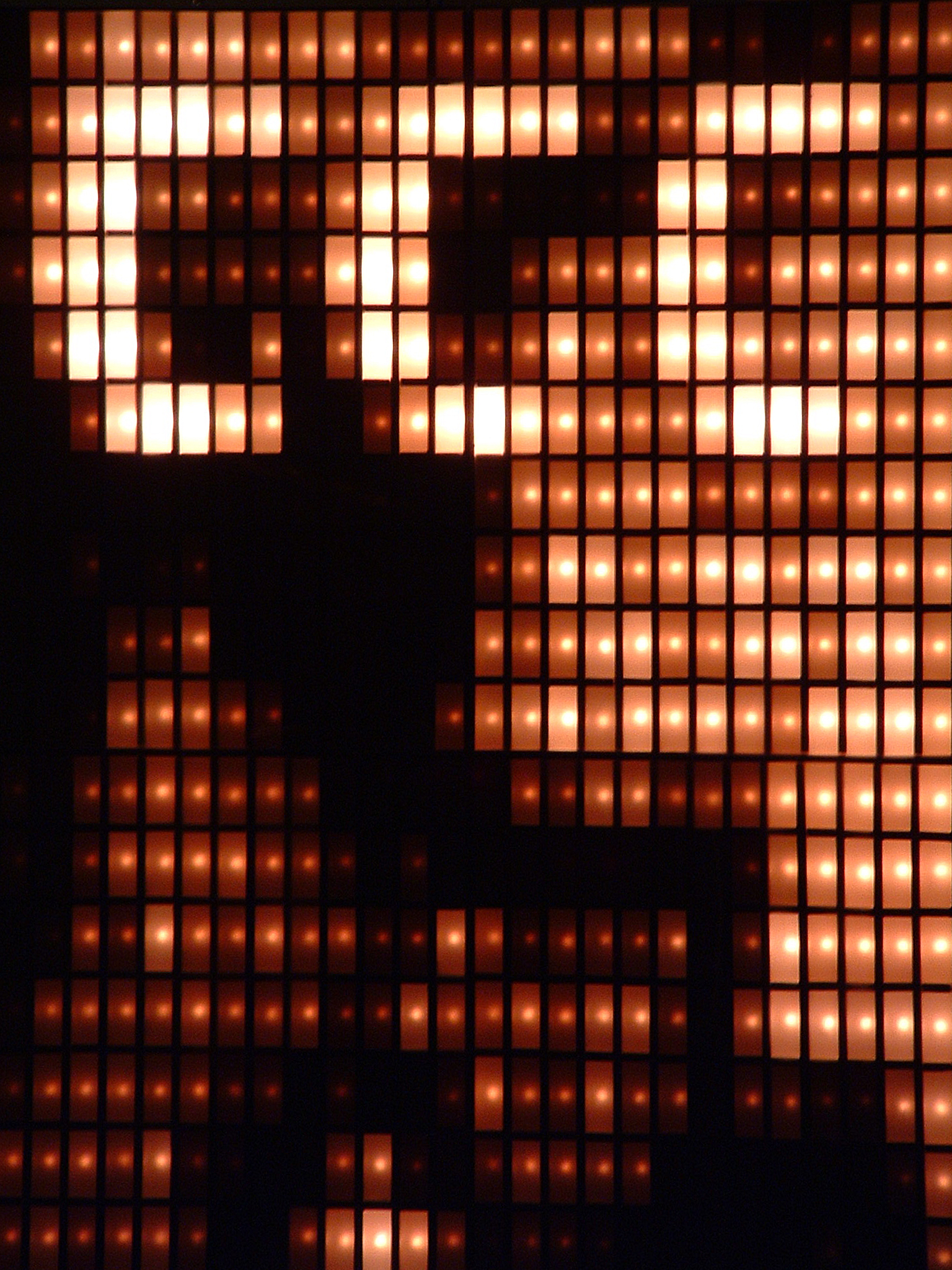
Blinkenlights at the 22nd Chaos Communication Congress

In 2001, the CCC celebrated its twentieth birthday with an interactive light installation dubbed Project Blinkenlights that turned the building Haus des Lehrers in Berlin into a giant computer screen. A follow-up installation, Arcade, was created in 2002 by the CCC for the Bibliothèque nationale de France. Later in October 2008 CCC's Project Blinkenlights went to Toronto, Ontario, Canada with project Stereoscope.

=== Schäuble fingerprints ===
In March 2008, the CCC acquired and published the fingerprints of German Minister of the Interior Wolfgang Schäuble. The magazine also included the fingerprint on a film that readers could use to fool fingerprint readers. This was done to protest the use of biometric data in German identity devices such as e-passports.

=== Staatstrojaner affair ===
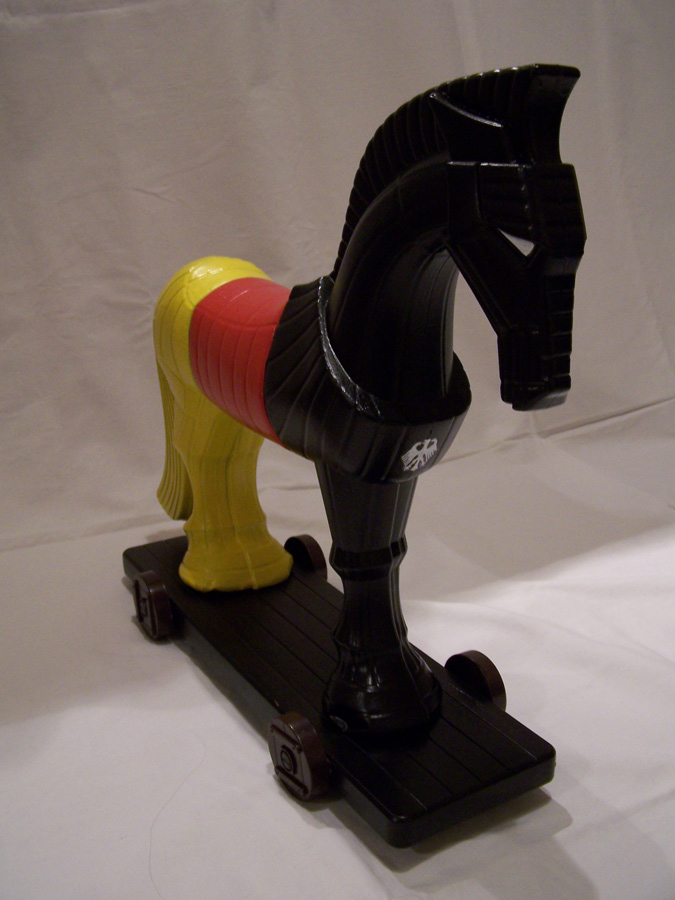
Mascot used to protest against the Staatstrojaner, a trojan horse

The Staatstrojaner (Federal Trojan horse) is a computer surveillance program installed secretly on a suspect's computer, which the German police uses to wiretap Internet telephony. This "source wiretapping" is the only feasible way to wiretap in this case, since Internet telephony programs will usually encrypt the data when it leaves the computer. The Federal Constitutional Court of Germany has ruled that the police may only use such programs for telephony wiretapping, and for no other purpose, and that this restriction should be enforced through technical and legal means.

On 8 October 2011, the CCC published an analysis of the Staatstrojaner software. The software was found to have the ability to remote control the target computer, to capture screenshots, and to fetch and run arbitrary extra code. The CCC says that having this functionality built in is in direct contradiction to the ruling of the constitutional court.

In addition, there were a number of security problems with the implementation. The software was controllable over the Internet, but the commands were sent completely unencrypted, with no checks for authentication or integrity. This leaves any computer under surveillance using this software vulnerable to attack. The captured screenshots and audio files were encrypted, but so incompetently that the encryption was ineffective. All captured data was sent over a proxy server in the United States, which is problematic since the data is then temporarily outside the German jurisdiction.

The CCC's findings were widely reported in the German press. This trojan has also been nicknamed R2-D2 because the string "C3PO-r2d2-POE" was found in its code; another alias for it is 0zapftis ("It's tapped!" in Bavarian, a sardonic reference to Oktoberfest). According to a Sophos analysis, the trojan's behavior matches that described in a confidential memo between the German Landeskriminalamt and a software firm called DigiTask; the memo was leaked on WikiLeaks in 2008. Among other correlations is the dropper's file name scuinst.exe, short for Skype Capture Unit Installer. The 64-bit Windows version installs a digitally signed driver, but signed by the non-existing certificate authority "Goose Cert". DigiTask later admitted selling spy software to governments.

The Federal Ministry of the Interior released a statement in which they denied that R2-D2 has been used by the Federal Criminal Police Office (BKA); this statement however does not eliminate the possibility that it has been used by state-level German police forces. The BKA had previously announced however (in 2007) that they had somewhat similar trojan software that can inspect a computer's hard drive.

=== Domscheit-Berg affair ===
Former WikiLeaks spokesman Daniel Domscheit-Berg was expelled from the national CCC (but not the Berlin chapter) in August 2011. This decision was revoked in February 2012. As a result of his role in the expulsion, board member Andy Müller-Maguhn was not reelected for another term.

=== Phone authentication systems ===
The CCC has repeatedly warned phone users of the weakness of biometric identification in the wake of the 2008 Schäuble fingerprints affair. In their "hacker ethics" the CCC includes "protect people data", but also "Computers can change your life for the better". The club regards privacy as an individual right: the CCC does not discourage people from sharing or storing personal information on their phones, but advocates better privacy protection, and the use of specific browsing and sharing techniques by users.

==== Apple TouchID ====
From a photograph of the user's fingerprint on a glass surface, using "easy everyday means", the biometrics hacking team of the CCC was able to unlock an iPhone 5S.

==== Samsung S8 iris recognition ====
The Samsung Galaxy S8's iris recognition system claims to be "one of the safest ways to keep your phone locked and the contents private" as "patterns in your irises are unique to you and are virtually impossible to replicate", as quoted in official Samsung content. However, in some cases, using a high resolution photograph of the phone owner's iris and a lens, the CCC claimed to be able to trick the authentication system.

== Fake Chaos Computer Club France ==
The Chaos Computer Club France (CCCF) was a fake hacker organisation created in 1989 in Lyon (France) by Jean-Bernard Condat, under the command of Jean-Luc Delacour, an agent of the Direction de la surveillance du territoire governmental agency. The primary goal of the CCCF was to watch and to gather information about the French hacker community, identifying the hackers who could harm the country. Journalist Jean Guisnel said that this organization also worked with the French National Gendarmerie.

The CCCF had an electronic magazine called Chaos Digest (ChaosD). Between 4 January 1993 and 5 August 1993, seventy-three issues were published (ISSN 1244-4901).

== See also ==
- 23 (film)
- c-base
- Chaos Communication Congress
- Chaosdorf, the local chapter of the Chaos Computer Club at Düsseldorf
- Datenschleuder
- Digitalcourage
- Digital identity
- Hacker culture
- Information privacy
- Netzpolitik.org
- Project Blinkenlights
- Security hacker
- Tron (hacker)
- Wau Holland Foundation
