= Hans Haacke =

German-born artist (born 1936)

- Born: August 12, 1936 (age 90); Cologne, Germany
- Education: Temple University
- Occupation: Visual artist
- Known for: Institutional Critique

Hans Haacke (born August 12, 1936) is a German-born artist who lives and works in New York City. Haacke is considered a "leading exponent" of institutional critique, and is considered to be the most harsh and consistent critic of museums among the Euro-American artists of his time.

== Early life ==
Haacke was born in Cologne, Germany. He studied at the Staatliche Werkakademie in Kassel, Germany, from 1956 to 1960. In 1959, Haacke was hired to assist with the second documenta, working as a guard and tour guide. He was a student of Stanley William Hayter, a well-known and influential English printmaker, draftsman, and painter. From 1961 to 1962, he studied on a Fulbright grant at the Tyler School of Art at Temple University in Philadelphia. From 1967 to 2002, Haacke was a professor at the Cooper Union in New York City.

Condensation Cube, (1963-1965); Plexiglas and water; Hirshhorn Museum and Sculpture Garden

During his formative years in Germany, he was a member of Zero (an international group of artists, active ca. 1957–1966). This group was held together with common motivations: the longing to re-harmonize man and nature and to restore art's metaphysical dimension. They sought to organize the pictorial surface without using traditional devices.

Although their methods differed greatly, most of the work was monochromatic, geometric, kinetic, and gestural. But most of all they used nontraditional materials such as industrial materials, fire and water, light, and kinetic effects. The influence of the Zero group and the materials they used is clear in Haacke's early work from his paintings that allude to movement and expression to his early installations that are formally minimal and use earthly elements as materials.

These early installations focused on systems and processes. Condensation Cube (1963–65) embodies a physical occurrence, of the condensation cycle, in real time. Some of the themes in these works from the 1960s include the interactions of physical and biological systems, living animals, plants, and the states of water and the wind. He also made forays into land art, but by the end of the 1960s, his art had found a more specific focus.

== Systems work (1970–present) ==
Haacke's interest in real-time systems propelled him into his criticism of social and political systems. In most of his work after the late 1960s, Haacke focused on the art world and the system of exchange between museums and corporations and corporate leaders; he often underlines its effects in site-specific ways.

Haacke has been outspoken throughout his career about demystifying the relationship between museums and businesses and their individual practices. He writes, "what we have here is a real exchange of capital: financial capital on the part of the sponsors and symbolic capital on the part of the sponsored". Using this concept from the work of Pierre Bourdieu, Haacke has underlined the idea that corporate sponsorship of art enhances the sponsoring corporations' public reputation, which is of material use to them. Haacke believes, moreover, that both parties are aware of this exchange, and as an artist, Haacke is intent on making this relationship clear to viewers.

In 1970, Hans Haacke proposed a work for the exhibition entitled Information to be held at the Museum of Modern Art in New York (an exhibition meant to be an overview of current younger artists), according to which the visitors would be asked to vote on a current socio-political issue. The proposal was accepted, and Haacke prepared his installation, entitled MoMA Poll, but did not hand in the specific question until right before the opening of the show. His query asked, "Would the fact that Governor Rockefeller has not denounced President Nixon's Indochina Policy be a reason for your not voting for him in November?" Visitors were asked to deposit their answers in the appropriate one of two transparent Plexiglas ballot boxes. At the end of the exhibition, there were approximately twice as many Yes ballots as No ballots. Haacke's question commented directly on the involvements of a major donor and board member at MoMA, Nelson Rockefeller. This installation is an early example of what in the art world came to be known as institutional critique. MoMA Poll was cited in 2019 by The New York Times as one of the works of art that defined the contemporary age.

In one of his best-known works, which quickly became an art historical landmark, Shapolsky et al. Manhattan Real Estate Holdings, A Real Time Social System, as of May 1, 1971, Haacke took on the real-estate holdings of one of New York City's biggest slum landlords. The work exposed, through meticulous documentation and photographs, the questionable transactions of Harry Shapolsky's real-estate business between 1951 and 1971. Haacke's solo show at the Solomon R. Guggenheim Museum, which was to include this work and which made an issue of the business and personal connections of the museum's trustees, was cancelled on the grounds of artistic impropriety by the museum's director six weeks before the opening. (Shapolsky was not such a trustee, although some have misunderstood the affair by assuming that he was.) Curator Edward F. Fry was consequently fired for his support of the work. This cancellation is widely considered as a turning point in the relationship between artists and museums in the United States, where such cooperation became conflicted.

Following the abrupt cancellation of his exhibition and the trouble it had caused with the museum, Haacke turned to other galleries, to Europe and his native country, where his work was more often accepted. Ten years later he included the Shapolsky work—by then widely known—at his solo exhibition at the New Museum of Contemporary Art, entitled "Hans Haacke: Unfinished Business".

At the John Weber gallery in New York, in 1972, on two separate occasions, Haacke created a sociological study, collecting data from gallery visitors. He requested the visitors fill out a questionnaire with 20 questions ranging from their personal demographic background information to opinions on social and political issues. The results of the questionnaires were translated into pie charts and bar graphs that were presented in the gallery at a later date. They revealed, among other things, that most visitors were related in some way to the professions of art, art teaching, and museology, and most were politically liberal.

In 1974, Haacke submitted another proposal that was subsequently rejected for an exhibition at the Wallraf–Richartz Museum in Cologne. The work described a well-documented history of the ownership (with individual biographies of each of the owners) of Manet's painting Bunch of Asparagus in the museum's collection, narrating how it came into the collection, and in which the Third Reich activities of its donor were revealed. Instead, the work was exhibited in the Paul Menz Gallery in Cologne with a color reproduction in place of the original.

In 1975, Haacke created a similar piece to the Manet project at the John Weber gallery in New York, exposing the history of ownership of Seurat's Models (Les Poseuses) (small version). In the same manner as the previous installation, this work showed the increase of the value of the work as it passed from one patron to another.

Also In 1975, he created one of his most memorable installations, entitled On Social Grease. The work, which takes its title from a speech by a corporate head of one of the world's major oil companies, is made up of carefully fractured plaques exhibiting quotes from business executives and important art world figures. These plaques display their opinions on the system of exchange between museums and businesses, speaking directly to the importance of the arts in business practices.

In 1978, Haacke had a solo exhibition at the Museum of Modern Art in Oxford, England, that included the new work A Breed Apart, which made explicit criticism of the state-owned British Leyland for exporting vehicles for police and military use to apartheid South Africa.

His 1979 solo exhibition at Chicago's Renaissance Society featured paintings that reproduced and altered print ads for Mobil, Allied Chemical, and Tiffany & Co.

=== 1980s ===
With extensive research Haacke continued throughout the 1980s to target corporations and museums in his work through larger scale installations and paintings. In 1982, at the documenta 7 exhibition, Haacke exhibited a very large work that included oil portraits of Ronald Reagan and Margaret Thatcher in 19th-century style, facing on the opposite wall a gigantic photograph of the demonstration against nuclear arms held earlier that year—the largest demonstration in Germany since the end of the Second World War. The clear implication, supported by Haacke's remarks, was that these two figures were attempting to roll back their respective nations to the socially and politically regressive, laissez-faire, and imperialist policies of the 19th century.

Becoming an increasingly strong critic of museums, Haacke wrote the polemical essay, "Museums, Managers of Consciousness," in 1984.

In 1988 he was given an exhibition at the Tate Gallery in London at which he exhibited the portrait of Margaret Thatcher, full of iconographic references featuring cameos of Maurice and Charles Saatchi. The Saatchis were well known not only as art collectors on an aggressive scale, widely affecting the course of the art world by their choices, but also as the managers of Thatcher's successful, fear-based political campaigns as well as that of the South African premier, P. W. Botha.

=== 1990s ===
Haacke's controversial 1990 painting Cowboy with Cigarette turned Picasso's Man with a Hat (1912–13) into a cigarette advertisement. The work was a reaction to the Phillip Morris company's sponsorship of a 1989–90 exhibition about Cubism at the Museum of Modern Art.

Haacke has had solo exhibitions since, at the New Museum of Contemporary Art, New York; the Van Abbemuseum, Eindhoven; and the Centre Georges Pompidou, Paris.

In 1993, Haacke shared, with Nam June Paik, the Golden Lion for the German Pavilion at the Venice Biennale. Haacke's installation Germania made explicit reference to the pavilion's roots in the politics of Nazi Germany. Haacke tore up the floor of the German pavilion as Hitler once had done. In 1993, looking through the doors of the pavilion, past the broken floor, the viewer witnesses the word on the wall: "Germania", Hitler's name for Nazi Berlin.

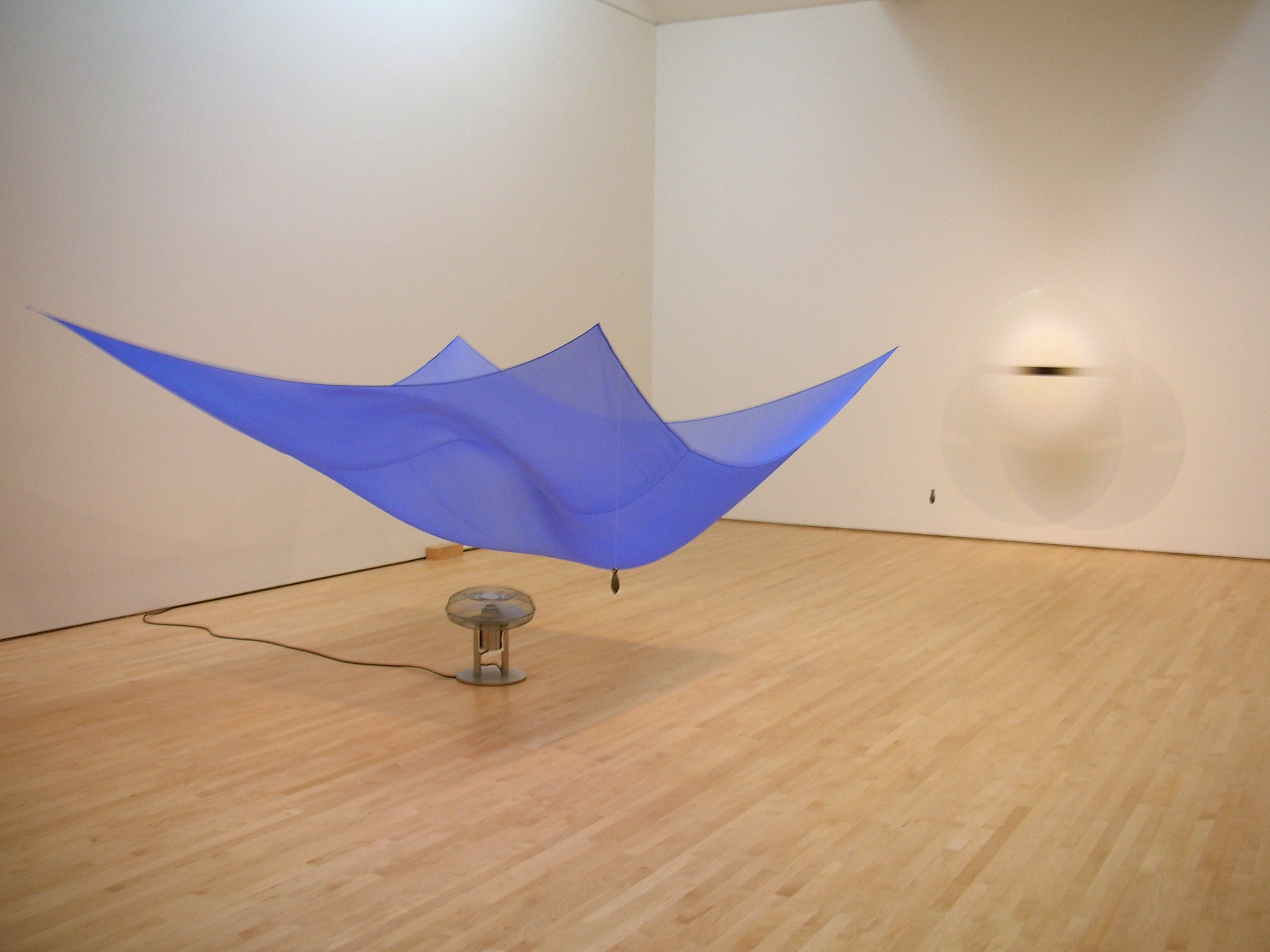
Blue Sail, photo was taken by Ed Schipul at the San Francisco Museum of Modern Art

=== 2000s ===
At the 2000 Whitney Biennial at the Whitney Museum of American Art in New York, Haacke presented a piece that is a direct reaction to art censorship. The piece called Sanitation featured six anti-art quotes from US political figures on each side of mounted American flags. The quotes were in a Gothic style script typeface once favored by Hitler's Third Reich. On the floor was an excerpt of the First Amendment of the U.S. Constitution, guaranteeing freedom of speech and expression. Lined up against the wall were a dozen garbage cans with speakers emitting military marching sounds. Haacke notes that "freedom of expression is the focus of the work".

=== Commissions ===
In 2000, the permanent installation DER BEVÖLKERUNG (To the Population) was inaugurated in the Reichstag, the German Parliament building in Berlin, and in 2006, a public commission commemorating Rosa Luxemburg was completed in a three-block area in the center of the city. In 2014, it was announced that Haacke would be installing one of his works as part of the annual Fourth Plinth commission in 2015. His winning commission of a bronze sculpture of a horse's skeleton, titled Gift Horse, comes with an electronic ribbon tied to its front leg that displays a live ticker of prices on the London Stock Exchange.

=== Use of law ===
Along with Adrian Piper and Michael Asher, Haacke uses a version of Seth Siegelaub and Robert Projansky's 1971 artist contract, The Artists Reserved Rights Transfer and Sale Agreement, in order to control the dissemination, display and ownership of his art works.

== Writing and publications ==
On being considered a political artist Haacke says: "it is uncomfortable for me to be a politicized artist.... the work of an artist with such a label is in danger of being understood one dimensionally without exception.... all artwork have a political component whether its intended or not". Jack Burnham comments on Haacke's political growth and links its roots to exposure to a time of political unrest in the US surrounding the Vietnam War. Burnham also points to Haacke's joining the Arts Workers Coalition and the boycott of the São Paulo Bienal in Brazil in 1969 as catalyst for the artist's work to take a political direction. Writing by Haacke and his close friends and colleagues, including documentation of his work, are collected in two separate books by the artist.

Hans Haacke first published a book about the ideas and processes behind his and other conceptual art called Framing and Being Framed. Published in 1995, Free Exchange, is a transcription of a conversation between Haacke and Pierre Bourdieu. The two men met in the 1980s and, as Bourdieu states in the introduction, "very quickly discovered how much they have in common".

== Notable works in public collections ==
- Condensation Cube (1963), Generali Foundation, Vienna (on permanent loan to Museum der Moderne Salzburg); Hirshhorn Museum and Sculpture Garden, Smithsonian Institution, Washington, DC; and Tate, London
- Blue Sail (1964-1965), San Francisco Museum of Modern Art
- Condensation Wall (1963/1966), National Gallery of Art, Washington, DC
- Shapolsky et al. Manhattan Real Estate Holdings, a Real-Time Social System, as of May 1, 1971 (1971), Centre Pompidou, Paris and Whitney Museum of American Art, New York City
- Sol Goldman and Alex DiLorenzo Manhattan Real Estate Holdings, A Real-Time Social System, as of May 1, 1971 (1971), Metropolitan Museum of Art, New York City and Tate, London
- Solomon R. Guggenheim Museum Board of Trustees (1974), Museum of Modern Art, New York City|
- A Breed Apart (1978), Tate, London
- Thank You, Paine Webber (1979), Metropolitan Museum of Art, New York City
- Oil Painting: Homage to Marcel Broodthaers (1982), Los Angeles County Museum of Art
- MetroMobiltan (1985), Centre Pompidou, Paris
- The Saatchi Collection (Simulations) (1987), The Broad, Los Angeles
- Mission Accomplished (2004-2005), National Gallery of Art, Washington, DC
- News (1969/2008), San Francisco Museum of Modern Art

== See also ==
- Autonomy Cube, a project by Trevor Paglen and Jacob Appelbaum inspired by Haacke's Condensation Cube
- Systems art
