= Torture Taxi =

2006 nonfiction book by Thompson & Paglen

Torture Taxi: On the Trail of the CIA's Rendition Flights
- Author: A. C. Thompson; Trevor Paglen
- Language: English
- Subject: Extraordinary rendition
- Genre: Non-fiction
- Publisher: Melville House
- Publication date: 2006
- Publication place: United States
- ISBN: 1-933633-09-3

Torture Taxi: On the Trail of the CIA's Rendition Flights is a 2006 book by A. C. Thompson and Trevor Paglen documenting the CIA's extraordinary rendition program.

The authors note the discovery of the program's means of transportation, rendition aircraft, by aviation enthusiasts, who spotted discrepancies in the flights of four aircraft, and correlations between their unusual flight patterns and the list of sites reputed to be the destination for ghost detainees.

A 2004 investigation by the San Francisco Bay Guardian examined an aircraft allegedly used in the CIA’s extraordinary rendition programme.

A review in Toward Freedom described Torture Taxi as a detailed investigation of the CIA’s extraordinary rendition programme, highlighting its use of flight logs, eyewitness testimony and official records.

== See also ==
- Aero Contractors (US) reputedly provides air transport services for the Central Intelligence Agency
- Air America former United States civilian airline operated by the Central Intelligence Agency during the Vietnam War
- Extrajudicial detention
- Ghost Plane: The True Story of the CIA Rendition and Torture Program – book by Stephen Grey
- Jeppesen
- Planespotting
- Taxi to the Dark Side – documentary film
- Tepper Aviation
- Traffic analysis
