= Berliner Hochschule für Technik =

Technical school in Berlin, Germany

- Berliner Hochschule für Technik
- Motto: Studiere Zukunft (German)
- Motto in English: Study the future
- Type: Public
- Established: 1823; 203 years ago 1971
- Budget: EUR 121.8 million (2023)
- President: Julia Neuhaus
- Academic staff: 297
- Administrative staff: 795
- Students: 11,640 (12 June 2025)
- Undergraduates: 8,614 (12 June 2025)
- Postgraduates: 3,026 (12 June 2025)
- Location: Berliner Hochschule für Technik; Luxemburger Str. 10; 13353, Berlin, Germany; 52°32′39″N 13°21′10″E
- Campus: Urban
- Website: www.bht-berlin.de

The Berliner Hochschule für Technik (BHT) (translated as "Berlin University of Applied Sciences and Technology") is the second largest University of Applied Sciences in Berlin, Germany. There are around 12,000 students studying at BHT in more than 70 majors and 843 employees, under which there are 297 professors and 36 guest lecturers.

It was formerly known as Technische Fachhochschule Berlin or TFH Berlin. From 2009 until 2021, it was named Beuth Hochschule für Technik Berlin, after Christian Peter Wilhelm Beuth. Due to Beuth's antisemitic history, the name was changed to the Berliner Hochschule für Technik, effective 1 October 2021.

== History ==
The BHT traces its roots back to the establishment of the Royal Academy for Gardening (German Königliche Gärtner-Lehranstalt) in 1823. In 1878 it was expanded into the Academy of Architectural Engineering followed and then into the Erste Handwerkerschule Berlin in 1878. Two years later the First School of Skilled Manual Workers Berlin was established as a university of applied sciences for carpenters and bricklayers.

In 1909 the Beuth Academy for Engineering Berlin was established. Followed by several smaller institutes and academies across the metropolitan area such as the Baugewerkschule Neukölln in 1919 and the School of Engineering the institution was upgraded amongst the years.

The present university of applied sciences called Technische Fachhochschule Berlin was established in 1971 when several faculties such as food technology were also integrated. Those faculties have since then been accommodated at the new campus at the Luxemburger Straße in Berlin. On January 17, 2008, the academic general assembly decided to change the name of the institution into Beuth Hochschule für Technik Berlin starting in 2009. The new name refers to Christian Peter Wilhelm Beuth, a former Prussian ministry representative who is being considered to be the spiritual father of engineering training in Germany because he was in charge of establishing the Technisches Institut in Berlin in 1821.

== Faculties ==
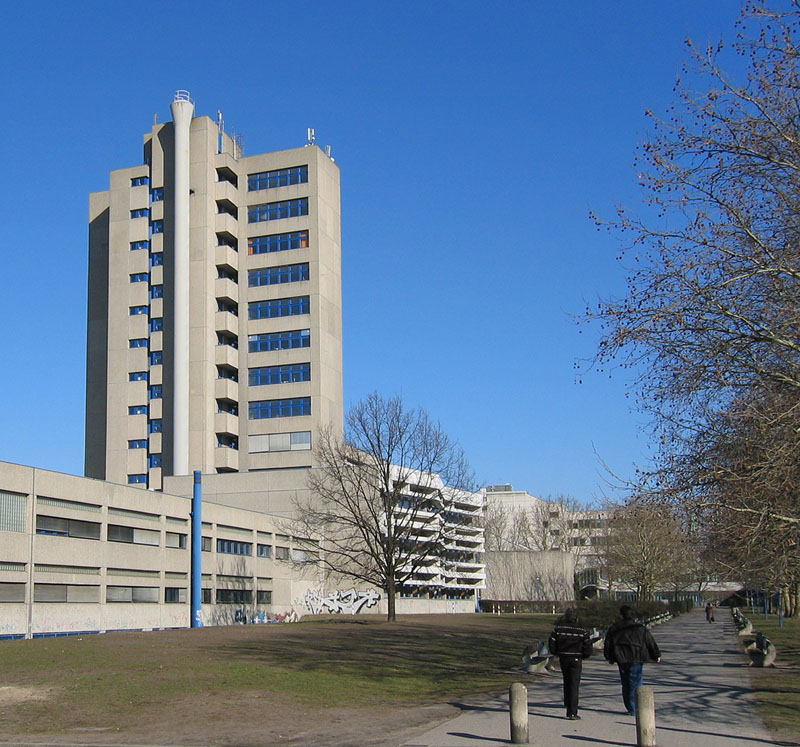
Grashof Building at BHT

The BHT is divided into several departments instead of faculties like general public universities. Currently, there are eight departments with varying numbers of degree programs.

Since 2005, BHT has offered degree programs for bachelor's or master's degree only. BHT is the only public institution in Germany that offers a degree program for Theater and Event Technology and Management.

== Educational partnerships ==
The BHT maintains a co-operative programme featuring national companies such as the Deutsche Bahn, Burger King, the Berlin promotion agency and Audi. The programme enables students to gain practical work experience via a co-operative education programme on-the-job.

=== International exchange programs ===
There are over 20 universities and educational institutions that hold student exchange programs with the BHT in Europe under "the Erasmus Partnerships" program, and the Partnerships worldwide for global network. To name a few, in the EU the Hogeschool Gent (HoGent) - University College Ghent in Belgium, the University of Food Technologies in Bulgaria, Copenhagen School of Design and Technology (KEA) in Denmark, Helsinki Metropolia in Finland, École Nationale Supérieure Agronomique de Toulouse in France, Hellenic Open University in Greece, Politecnico di Milano in Italy, Adam Mickiewicz University in Poland, and Glasgow Caledonian University in the UK. It is also a member of the Ge4, or Global Education: Exchanges for Engineers and Entrepreneurs, an independent non-profit network of universities established in 1996 for the purpose of connecting global industry and academic institutions.

=== Athletics ===
The BHT maintains a very famous institute for collegiate sports. It is also famous for being the Olympic Support Centre of Berlin. The faculties include a training centre for public security guards.

== Notable academic staff ==
- Stephan Braunfels (born 1950), German architect
- Felix Gers, German computer scientist and co-developer of Long short-term memory (LSTM)

== Notable people ==
- Julia Neuhaus (born 1983), German economist and president of Berliner Hochschule für Technik since 2023
- Hartmut Mehdorn (born 1942), German manager and former chairman of the board of the German Railway company
- Boris Floricic (1972–1998 in Berlin) was a German hacker and developer of the cryptophon

== Memberships ==
- Studentische Darlehnskasse e.V.

== See also ==
- Fachhochschule
