= Burkhard Schröder =

German journalist based in Berlin

Burkhard Schröder is a German journalist based in Berlin. From 2005 to 2007, he was the editor of Berliner Journalisten.

== Life ==
Schroeder writes for the online magazine Telepolis and deals primarily with the themes of Internet culture, Internet and right-wing radicalism. One of his most known books is entitled Nazis and Pop appeared in the espresso-Verlag.

Schroeder's book Tron - Death of a Hacker Under the Alias of the "Tron" about the late German hacker Boris Floricic has been a source of controversy in the German hacker subculture. While the then Speaker of the Chaos Computer Club, Andy Mueller-Maguhn and the relatives of the dead believe Floricic was murdered, Schroeder's research findings suggest how the results of the police investigation concluded that Floricic committed suicide.

On 12 November 2008, Berlin police searched Schroeder's home and confiscated his computer. The search warrant was based on the suspicion of an offense "aiding and abetting access" to material published by people "inciting racial hatred [and] denying the Holocaust" - a criminal offense in Germany. He was accused of having bomb-making instructions with the intent to publish them. On 30 June 2009, he spoke freely, the District Court Berlin-Tiergarten. He was ultimately acquitted in October 2010.

Schroeder is co-founder of the nonprofit association German Privacy Foundation (GPF). The GPF provides information under the statutes of secure communications on the Internet and wants to ensure that the topics of encryption and anonymity on the net are shown better in the media.

== Works ==
=== Books ===
- Among men. Brothers, buddies, comrades. Universe Books, New 1988, ISBN 3-499-18236-X
- From cuts. About power and powerlessness of emotions after a breakup. Universe Books, New 1989, ISBN 3-499-18250-5
- Traces of Power. Cowards, Schumacker, muscular men. Universe Books, New 1990, ISBN 3-499-18264-5
- Right guys. Skinheads, fascists, hooligans. Universe Books, New 1992, ISBN 3-499-18271-8
- Heroin. Corner addiction? - An educational book Universe Books, New 1993, ISBN 3-499-13276-1
- I was a neo-Nazi. Report on the dropout Ingo Hasselbach. Ravensburger Verlag, Ravensburg, 1994, ISBN 3-473-35139-3
- Neo-Nazis and computer networks. Universe Books, New 1995, ISBN 3-499-19912-2
- The V-man. Red Book publishing, Hamburg 1997, ISBN 3-88022-516-8
- In the grip of right-wing scene -. East German cities in fear Universe Books, New 1997, ISBN 3-499-22125-X
- Tron - Death of a Hacker Universe Books, New 1999. ISBN 3-499-60857-X
- Nazis are pop. Espresso Verlag, Berlin 2000, ISBN 3-88520-779-6
- The conquistadors. Universe Books, New 2001, ISBN 3-499-22754-1
- Dropouts. Ravensburger Verlag, Ravensburg, 2002, ISBN 3-473-58175-5
- The on-line search (with Claudia Schröder), dpunkt.verlag / Telepolis, Hanover, 2008, ISBN 978-3-936931-53-2

=== Science fiction ===
- The Einstein-Bose condensate - published in June 1997 in the Isaac Asimov-Magazine No. 49, entitled Guerrilla Cypher, Heyne Verlag
- Brother - published in the EU 3/2000
- Eidolon - published in c't 17/2002
- Salvaje - published in ThunderYEAR2002

=== Collaborative works ===
- Klaus Farin, Henning Flad, Frauke chair, Rainer Erb, Burkhard Schröder: Reactionary rebels: far-right music publisher in Germany Tilsner, Bad Tolz 2001. ISBN 3-936068-04-6
- A career in German: Günter Grass, Daniela Dahn, Johano Strasser (eds.). In a rich country - testimony to the suffering everyday society Steidl Verlag, Göttingen, 2002. ISBN 3-88243-841-X
