= Jacob Appelbaum =

American computer security researcher (born 1983)

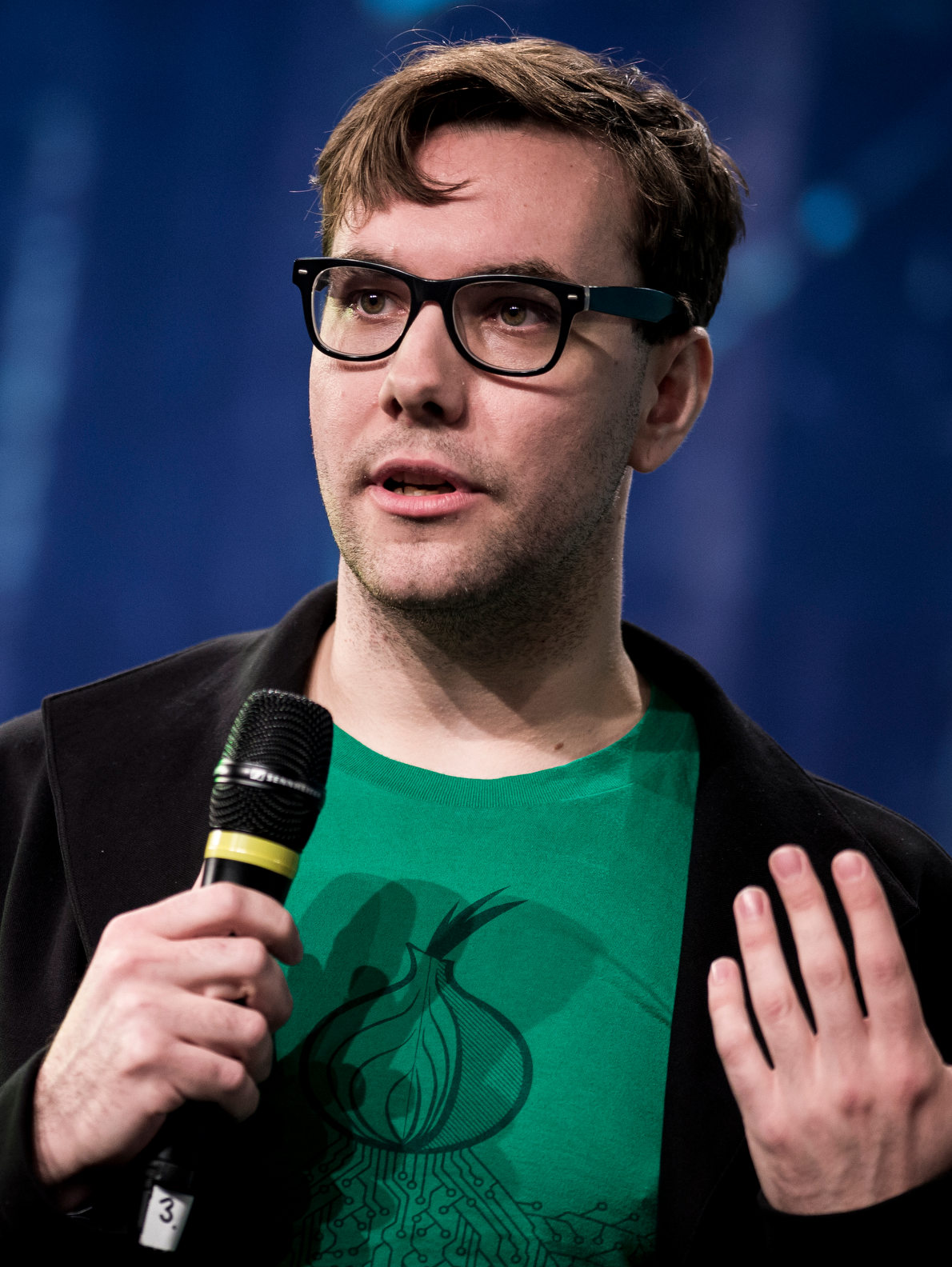
- Appelbaum in 2014
- Born: April 1, 1983 (age 43)
- Known for: Computer security research; Spokesperson for WikiLeaks; Developer for The Tor Project; Journalist dealing with Edward Snowden documents; Sexual abuse allegations; Documentary Nobody Wants to Talk About Jacob Appelbaum
- Awards: 2014 Henri Nannen Prize
- Scientific career
- Fields: Computer security, Cryptography
- Workplaces: University of Washington, Eindhoven University of Technology, Noisebridge, WikiLeaks

Jacob Appelbaum (born April 1, 1983) is an American independent journalist, computer security researcher, and hacker. Appelbaum, who earned his PhD from the Eindhoven University of Technology, first became notable for his work as a core member of the Tor Project, a free software network designed to provide online anonymity. Appelbaum collaborated with WikiLeaks and made journalistic contributions at Der Spiegel based on the NSA documents leaked by Edward Snowden that brought him widespread recognition. He stood in for Julian Assange at computer security and hacker forums when Assange could no longer travel to the United States. Under the pseudonym "ioerror", Appelbaum was an active member of the Cult of the Dead Cow hacker collective from 2008 to 2016. He was the co-founder of the San Francisco hackerspace Noisebridge with Mitch Altman. He worked for the internet pornography company Kink.com and Greenpeace and volunteered for the Ruckus Society and the Rainforest Action Network. He was on the Technical Advisory Board of the Freedom of the Press Foundation.

In 2013, Appelbaum was one of a small group of journalists who had direct access to the NSA documents leaked by Edward Snowden, he was then part of publication of the stories in Der Spiegel on U.S. spying on German Chancellor Angela Merkel, on United Nations diplomats, and other stories. In 2014, Appelbaum was awarded the Henri Nannen Prize, the equivalent of the Pulitzer Prize in Germany, for his work on the U.S-Merkel-spying story. Later that year, he accepted awards on-behalf of Snowden, who was marooned in Russia as an asylee.

In 2016, he was the object of allegations of sexual misconduct, and alleged assault. No formal charges were filed. Within a short-period around June 2016, Appelbaum withdrew or was asked to step down from many of the organizations for which he was well-known as a key member, as well as his employer Tor. Tor performed an external investigation, the results of which supported the accusers. Appelbaum denied the allegations. German press outlet Die Zeit defended Appelbaum (who is a resident of Germany), citing the lack of formal charges by accusers as well as inconsistencies and contradictions in the allegations. Appelbaum was defended by a group of female lawyers, activists and journalists with whom he had worked closely. These women launched an online appeal for support to contest the allegations, voicing concerns about due process, trial by social media, and questioning the claims.

In 2024, a documentary about Appelbaum, Nobody Wants to Talk About Jacob Appelbaum, directed and produced by Jamie Kastner, which addressed the allegations and accusers, and Appelbaum's position on events, became available on Apple TV. Appelbaum's life in Berlin was shown, including challenges faced due to pressure from the United States Department of Justice to testify against the imprisoned Julian Assange, interviews with WikiLeaks lawyer Margaret Ratner Kunstler, and his personal experiences with U.S. surveillance.

== Early life and education ==
Appelbaum says that he tested out of high school and attended junior college briefly before he "stopped college and continued [his] education". In a wide-ranging interview with Rolling Stone magazine in 2010, Appelbaum stated that he comes from "a family of lunatics... [a]ctual, raving lunatics". He stated that his mother "is a paranoid schizophrenic" who "insisted that Jake had somehow been molested by his father while he was still in the womb".

Appelbaum was taken away from his mother by his aunt when he was six years old. Two years later, he was placed in a children's home in Sonoma County, California. At age 10, his indigent father was awarded custody of him. According to Appelbaum, being introduced to computer programming by a friend's father saved his life: "The Internet is the only reason I'm alive today." Appelbaum says that he developed OCD at a young age. He has also stated that his father, who struggled with heroin addiction, was murdered by poisoning.

Starting in 2015, Appelbaum was a Ph.D. student studying under at the Eindhoven University of Technology. He received his Ph.D. in March 2022. which is published under the title "Communication in a world of pervasive surveillance".

== Career ==
=== Journalism ===
Appelbaum was among several people to gain access to former NSA contractor Edward Snowden's top secret documents released in 2013.

On 23 October 2013, Appelbaum and other writers and editors at Der Spiegel reported that their investigations had led German Chancellor Angela Merkel to confront the U.S. government over evidence that it was monitoring her personal cell phone. US President Barack Obama denied the report. The Der Spiegel team reported on the resulting controversy and detailed a further claim that the Embassy of the United States, Berlin, was being used as a base of operations for electronic surveillance of its German ally. The BBC's Damien McGuinness commented that "The scandal has caused one of the biggest diplomatic rifts between Germany and the U.S." At the scandal's peak, Merkel compared the National Security Agency with the East German Stasi secret police during an angry conversation with Obama.

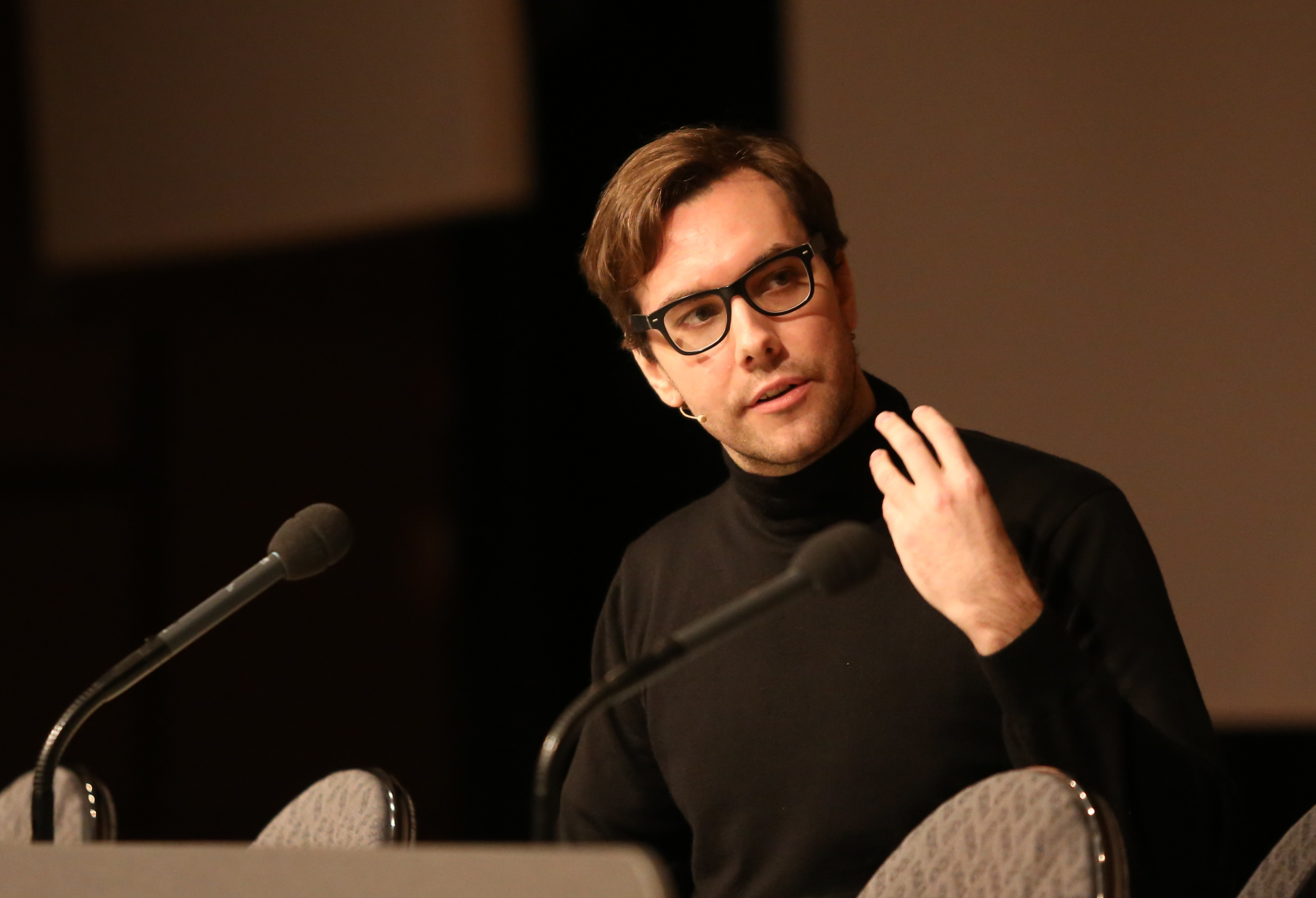
Appelbaum at a talk at 30C3 in Hamburg (2013).

The Der Spiegel team's reporting about Merkel earned the 2014 Henri Nannen prize for investigative journalism. Appelbaum shared the prize with Der Spiegel writers and editors Marcel Rosenbach, Jörg Schindler, and Holger Stark. A few days later he provoked a furor by condemning Nannen, the prize's namesake, for his Nazi collaboration, declaring that he would have his bronze bust of Nannen melted down and recast, and donate his prize money to anti-fascist groups.

On 28 December 2013, at the Chaos Communication Congress, he presented documents showing that the NSA can turn iPhones into eavesdropping tools and has developed devices to harvest electronic information from a computer even if the computer is not online. An investigative team at Der Spiegel, including Appelbaum, simultaneously published their findings, along with a descriptive list of the surveillance devices making up the NSA ANT catalog.

On 3 July 2014, German broadcaster NDR/ARD carried disclosures by Appelbaum and others about the operation of NSA's top-secret XKeyscore surveillance software, including source code proving that a computer of Appelbaum's had been targeted.

On 28 December 2014, Der Spiegel again drew from the Snowden documents to assess the NSA's ability to crack encrypted Internet communications. In a separate article, they described how British and American intelligence used covert surveillance to target, often inaccurately, suspected Taliban fighters and drug smugglers for killing.

Appelbaum has appeared several times on Democracy Now! as a security researcher, privacy activist, and target of government surveillance. He appeared with Julian Assange on Episode 8 & 9 of World Tomorrow, "Cypherpunks".

He is a contributor to Julian Assange's 2012 book Cypherpunks: Freedom and the Future of the Internet along with Andy Müller-Maguhn and Jérémie Zimmermann.

Appelbaum was a member of the outside volunteer technical advisory board of the Freedom of the Press Foundation until 8 June 2016.

=== Technology ===
In 2005, Appelbaum gave two talks at the 22nd Chaos Communication Congress, Personal Experiences: Bringing Technology and New Media to Disaster Areas, and A Discussion About Modern Disk Encryption Systems. At the 2006 23rd Chaos Communication Congress, he gave a talk with Ralf-Philipp Weinmann titled Unlocking FileVault: An Analysis of Apple's Encrypted Disk Storage System.

Appelbaum has collaborated on several other high-profile research projects.

- The cold boot attack, with J. Alex Halderman, Seth Schoen, Nadia Heninger, William Clarkson, William Paul, Joseph A. Calandrino, Ariel J. Feldman, and Edward W. Felten. Winner of USENIX Security Best Student Paper award and the Pwnie Award for Most Innovative Research.
- The MD5 collision attack, with Alexander Sotirov, Marc Stevens, Arjen Lenstra, David Molnar, Dag Arne Osvik, and Benne de Weger. The proof of concept was to use a cluster of 200 Sony PlayStation 3 systems to create two valid SSL certificates containing an MD5 collision. The bogus "MD5 Collisions Inc." certificate authority still appears (blacklisted) in the Mozilla Firefox certificate store.
- Smart parking meter vulnerabilities, with Joe Grand and Chris Tarnovsky, presented as "'Smart' Parking Meter Implementations, Globalism, and You" at Black Hat 2008.
- The Open Observatory of Network Interference (OONI), founded in collaboration with Arturo Filastò to collect "data which will show an accurate topology of network surveillance, interference and outright censorship".

=== Art ===
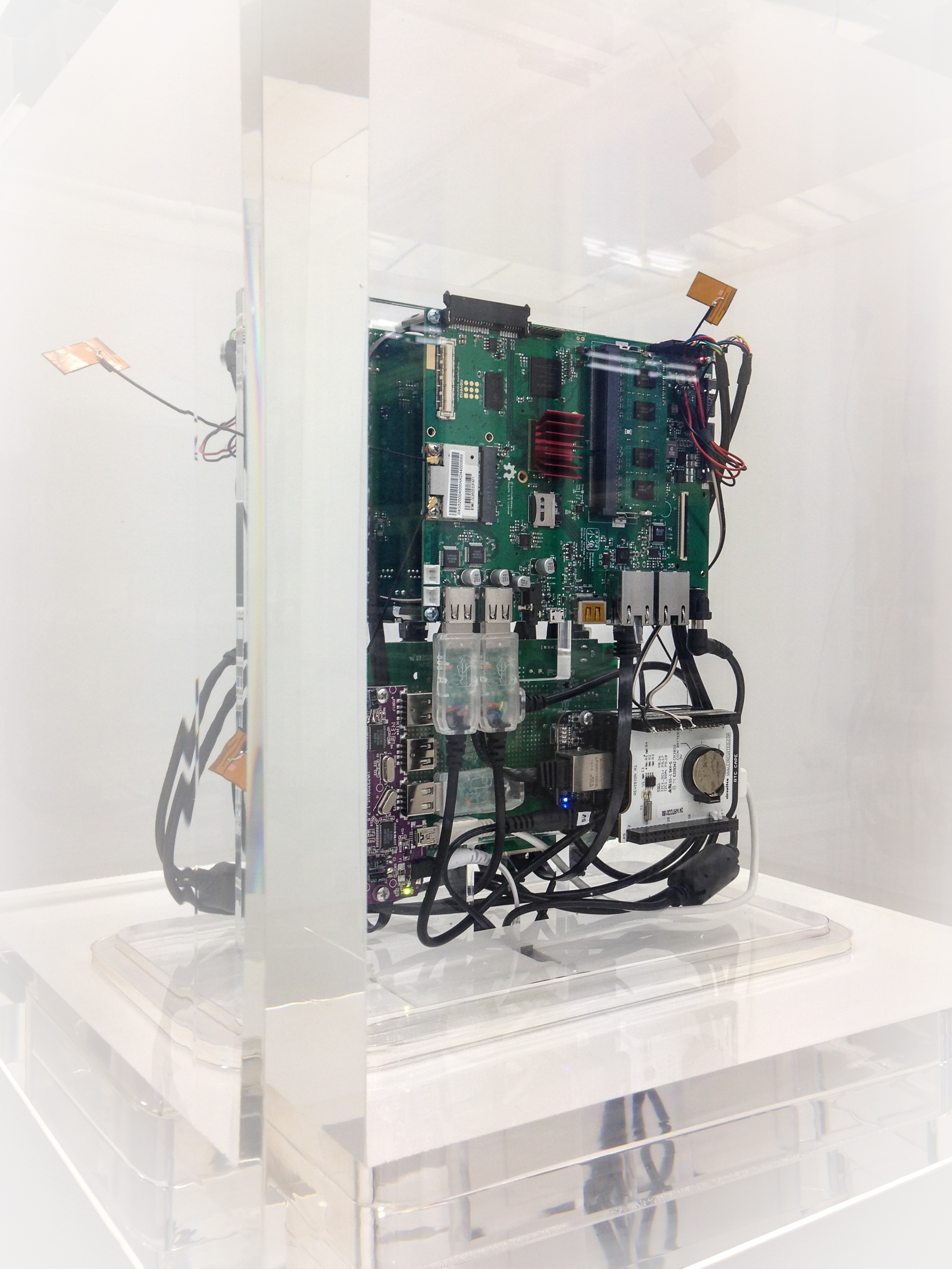
One of several Autonomy Cubes on display.

Appelbaum has taken part in a number of art projects with dissident artists including Laura Poitras, Trevor Paglen, Ai Weiwei, and Angela Richter. His art has given rise to projects such as Panda to Panda (P2P) and the Autonomy Cube.

Appelbaum is also a photographer who has contributed still photographs to film and game projects. He exhibited his work in a solo show at NOME in 2016.

Appelbaum appeared in Laura Poitras's Academy Award-winning film Citizenfour (2014), which documents the public emergence of NSA whistle-blower Edward Snowden and the political circumstances leading to his actions. Appelbaum stars in Poitras's portrait of WikiLeaks founder Julian Assange, Risk (2016). Appelbaum worked with Canadian film-maker Jamie Kastner for his documentary, "Nobody Wants to Talk About Jacob Appelbaum." The film was screened for buyers in September 2023.

He was an artist in residence for the art group monochrom at Museumsquartier in 2006.

== Activism ==
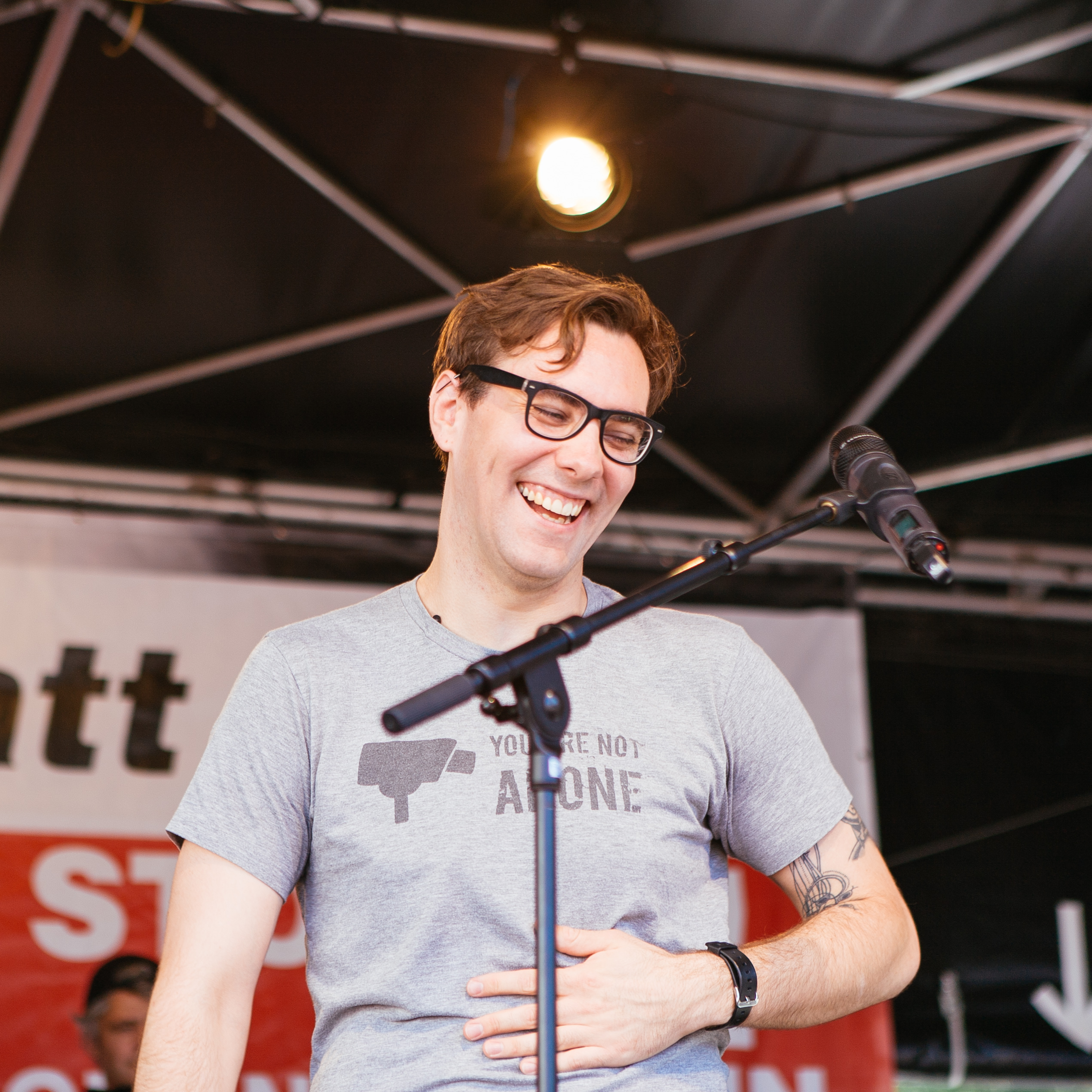
Appelbaum talks at the protest march, Freedom not fear, in Berlin (2013).

Appelbaum represented Wikileaks founder Julian Assange in a keynote address at the 2010 HOPE conference.

In August 2013, Appelbaum delivered Edward Snowden's acceptance speech after he was awarded the biannual Whistleblower Prize by a group of NGOs at the Berlin-Brandenburg Academy of Sciences and Humanities.

== Surveillance, airport detention, and WikiLeaks investigation ==
Appelbaum says he believes he has been under government surveillance since 2009, to the detriment of himself, his friends, and his close relations. In interviews he has stated that living in Germany has given him a sense of relief from U.S. surveillance. Appelbaum has described various aggressive surveillance events, and implies they are related to his work with WikiLeaks, to his privacy activism, and to relationships with other privacy activists, notably reporters linked to Edward Snowden. In December 2013, Appelbaum said he suspected the U.S. government of breaking into his Berlin apartment and using his computer.

While traveling, Appelbaum has been detained at airports and had his electronic equipment seized several times.

In 2010, the US Department of Justice obtained a court order compelling Twitter to provide data associated with the user accounts of Appelbaum, as well as several other individuals associated with WikiLeaks. While the order was originally sealed, Twitter successfully petitioned the court to unseal it, permitting the company to inform its users that their account information had been requested.

In September 2013, he testified before the European Parliament, mentioning that his partner had been spied on by men in night-vision goggles as she slept.

In 2015, it was revealed that Google had been forced to turn over information from his Gmail account.

In 2019, he told reporters that he had been contacted by Alexandria prosecutors about cooperating with the WikiLeaks grand jury for immunity, but had refused.

== Allegations of sexual misconduct ==
In March 2015, Appelbaum was suspended from his position at the Tor Project for ten days due to alleged incidents of harassment.

On 25 May 2016, Appelbaum stepped down from his position at Tor; this was announced on 2 June by the non-profit in a short statement. On 4 June, Shari Steele, the former executive director of the Tor Project, published a much longer statement, noting that although prior allegations of sexual abuse regarding Appelbaum were consistent with "rumors some of us had been hearing for some time" that "the most recent allegations are much more serious and concrete than anything we had heard previously."

Also on 4 June, a website appeared with anonymous accounts of mistreatment by Appelbaum. On 6 June, Appelbaum issued a statement denouncing the allegations as part of a concerted strategy to damage his reputation. Security engineer Leigh Honeywell came forward on 7 June to publicly relate the website's stories with her relationship with Appelbaum, in which she described Appelbaum ignoring a safeword and becoming violent. An anonymously leaked letter that the Tor Project's human resources manager had written to Appelbaum in conjunction with his March 2015 suspension for unprofessional conduct was published on 7 June. On 15 June, Alison Macrina (the director of the Library Freedom Project) and Isis Lovecruft (a Tor developer) publicly announced that the website's anonymous accounts of sexual abuse, under the pseudonyms of "Sam" and "Forest", respectively, were their own.

In response to the allegations, the Cult of the Dead Cow ejected Appelbaum on 7 June, and the Freedom of the Press Foundation removed him from their volunteer technical advisory board on 8 June. Noisebridge announced on 10 June that co-founder Appelbaum had triggered their Anti-Harassment policy and is "no longer welcome in our community, either in its physical or online spaces", and on 17 June the Chaos Computer Club announced that he was not welcome. On 18 June his status as a Debian project developer was revoked. On 1 July Linux Australia barred Appelbaum from future events.

On 10 June, a woman whom three witnesses claimed to have seen being abused, denied the abuse allegations. In a statement released by Gizmodo journalist William Turton, she wrote that her experience was distorted and reported without her consent. On 17 June 2016, activists, journalists and legal professionals supporting Appelbaum signed a document defending his right to due process, and deploring the story's treatment by social media. In June 2016, the façade of the building in which Appelbaum's Berlin apartment is located was defaced in English and German with graffiti directly referencing the allegations.

In July 2016, the Tor Project announced it had completed a seven-week investigation led by a hired investigator. According to Shari Steele, Tor Project "did everything in our power" to treat Mr. Appelbaum fairly, and "we determined that the allegations against him appear to be true."

In July 2016, Süddeutsche Zeitung reported that allegations against Appelbaum had been known in Berlin hacker circles for years. A hacker from Berlin told the newspaper that "I can feel a huge sense of relief that the silence has at last been broke." On 11 August 2016, the German weekly Die Zeit published a lengthy investigation into the rape charges, including interviews with three people present at the scene of the alleged rape. None of these witnesses corroborated the claims made by the anonymous victim. The article also reports that a second falsely identified victim had demanded that her story be removed from the anonymous website. A change in attitude in the information security community towards calling out known abusers and believing reports of sexual misconduct was partially credited to Appelbaum's precedent.

Jamie Kastner directed and produced the documentary Nobody Wants to Talk About Jacob Appelbaum. The documentary partly addresses the sexual misconduct allegations against Appelbaum. The documentary was presented at film festivals in the U.S. and Canada, before being released on Canadian television in 2024.

== Personal life ==
Appelbaum is an atheist of Jewish background and is queer. Politically, he is an anarchist.

In 2012, he moved to Berlin. He has stated that he does not want to go back to the United States because he doesn't feel safe there and in interviews he has provided specific examples of experiences that left him feeling unsafe.

== See also ==
- Hacktivism
