= Risk (2016 film) =

2016 film

- Theatrical release poster
- Directed by: Laura Poitras
- Written by: Laura Poitras
- Starring: Julian Assange; Laura Poitras; Jacob Appelbaum; Sarah Harrison
- Cinematography: Kirsten Johnson; Laura Poitras; Katy Scoggin
- Edited by: Erin Casper; Melody London; Laura Poitras
- Music by: Jeremy Flower
- Production companies: Praxis Films; Field of Vision; First Look Media
- Distributed by: Neon; Showtime Documentary Films
- Release dates: May 19, 2016 (Cannes); May 5, 2017 (United States)
- Running time: 91 minutes
- Country: United States
- Language: English
- Box office: $219,599

Risk is a 2016 American documentary film written and directed by Laura Poitras about the WikiLeaks founder Julian Assange. It was screened in the Directors' Fortnight section at the 2016 Cannes Film Festival and received generally favorable reviews.

Originally titled "Asylum", the film becomes a journey into Poitras's disillusionment with Assange. In the 2016 version of the film, Poitras presents a more sympathetic position towards Assange. The 2017 re-cut version focuses more on a critique of Assange as a flawed character, including his alleged sexual assaults and his "troubling" statements about women and responses to accusations against him.

== Overview ==
The film's original premise was to address the life of Julian Assange, documenting scenes showing "motives and contradictions of Assange and his inner circle", focusing on the risks taken by persons involved in the well-known Wikileaks website, including Assange. The documentary begins in 2010, addressing the judicial measures he came to face on the part of the Swedish authorities, which sought his extradition from the U.K. in 2012. Assange alleges that any such Swedish extradition would have culminated in an eventual extradition to the United States. The opening scene shows Assange (with Wikileaks staffer Sarah Harrison) calling the U.S. State Department, asking them to step-up security procedures. This segues into a presentation of Assange's angst about the fate of Chelsea Manning and Assange's plans to avoid U.S. capture. The film then presents documentation of Assange's asylum claim, and the disguising of himself to sneak into the Embassy of Ecuador in London for refuge.

Originally titled "Asylum", the film becomes a journey into Poitras's disillusionment with Assange. In the re-cut of the film, she altered the film's focus on the experience of risk-taking media work (Assange's as well as her own), towards a critique of Assange as a flawed character, including his alleged sexual assaults and "troubling" statements about women.

In the 2016 version of the film, Poitras presents a more sympathetic position towards Assange. The 2017 re-cut version focuses more on Assange's responses to accusations against him.

In mid-2016, directly after the Cannes screening, Assange friend and Wikileaks supporter Jacob Appelbaum was publicly accused of abusing women while working with Wikileaks and serving as a computer security activist at Tor. At one point in the film Poitras states in a voice-over her personal disappointment with Appelbaum, and her anger at Appelbaum's alleged abuse of one of her friends. In interviews, she stated that Julian Assange frantically attempted to get her to remove scenes in which he refers to the sexual assault allegations against him as a "radical feminist conspiracy" by lesbians, and that included him saying "an actual court case is going to be very hard for these women … they will be reviled for ever by a large segment of the world population. I don’t think it’s in their interest to proceed that way."

Assanges lawyers contacted her directly before Cannes. Poitras said that Assange sent her an SMS message "saying the film is a threat to his freedom and he is forced to treat it accordingly.". According to Poitras, this was what led her to refocus on the same accusations, to add the Appelbaum story to the film, and to change the overall message of the film.

The film touches briefly on the role played by Wikileaks in the 2016 U.S. election.

On April 9, 2017, Showtime released a trailer for the film, executive produced by Sam Esmail and set to be released in the "summer". In July 2017, the producers of Risk wrote an open letter saying that WikiLeaks had attempted to "censor the content of the film" and "add more scenes with attorney Amal Clooney because she makes WikiLeaks look good".

== Cast ==
- Jacob Appelbaum
- Laura Poitras
- Julian Assange
- Sarah Harrison
- Lady Gaga

== Reception ==
Review aggregator Rotten Tomatoes collected 101 reviews with an average rating of 7/10 As of July 18, 2018, of which 82% were positive. The website's critical consensus states: "Risk poses knotty questions regarding documentary filmmaking ethics, but remains consistently compelling despite its flaws." Metacritic gave the film a score of 72 out of 100 based on 27 critics, indicating "generally favorable reviews".

The New Republic wrote that "the scenes Poitras captures in RISK are remarkable". Some reviewers highlighted Poitras' complex relationship with WikiLeaks, Assange and Appelbaum. The Washington Post noted that WikiLeaks lawyer Melinda Taylor criticised the film based on a description without seeing it and that her comments "seem particularly off-base".

The film drew only $145,000 in box office remittances, a sharp drop from the $3 million earned by Citizenfour, Poitras' documentary about Edward Snowden.
