= Trevor Paglen =

American artist, geographer, and author (born 1974)

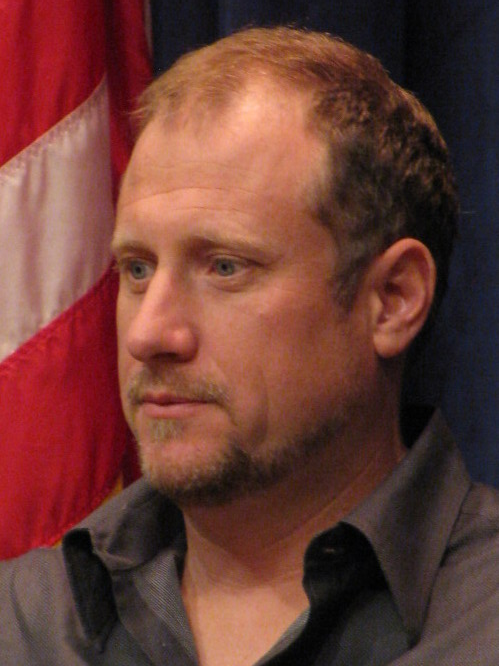
- Paglen in 2013
- Born: 1974 (age 51–52)
- Education: School of the Art Institute of Chicago (MFA); University of California at Berkeley (BA, Ph.D.)
- Awards: 2016 Deutsche Börse Photography Foundation Prize; 2017 MacArthur Fellowship

Trevor Paglen (born 1974) is an American artist, geographer, and author whose work covers mass surveillance and data collection.

In 2016, Paglen won the Deutsche Börse Photography Foundation Prize and he has also won The Cultural Award from the German Society for Photography. In 2017, he was a recipient of a MacArthur Fellowship. On March 17, 2026, Paglen was awarded the 2026 LG Guggenheim Award (a collaboration between LG and Guggenheim New York).

== Early life and education ==
Paglen earned a B.A. degree in religious studies in 1998 from the University of California at Berkeley, a M.F.A. degree in 2002 from the School of the Art Institute of Chicago, and a Ph.D. in Geography in 2008 from the University of California at Berkeley.

While at UC Berkeley, Paglen lived in the Berkeley Student Cooperative, residing in Chateau, Fenwick, and Rochdale co-ops.

== Work ==
Sean O'Hagan, writing in The Guardian in 2015, said that Paglen, whose "ongoing grand project [is] the murky world of global state surveillance and the ethics of drone warfare", "is one of the most conceptually adventurous political artists working today, and has collaborated with scientists and human rights activists on his always ambitious multimedia projects." His visual work such as his "Limit Telephotography" and "The Other Night Sky" series have received widespread attention for both his technical innovations and for his conceptual project that involves simultaneously making and negating documentary-style truth-claims. Paglen's work relies on contemporary technology in two meaningful ways. Firstly, the views he photographs would be impossible to shoot without media tech, that includes the cameras, the microscopes, and even helicopters. But interestingly enough, the shots would not be possible if not for the existence of the subject. The contrasts between secrecy and revelation, evidence and abstraction distinguish Paglen's work. With that the artist presents not so much "evidence" as admonitions to awareness.

He was an Eyebeam Commissioned Artist in 2007.

In 2008 the Berkeley Art Museum devoted a comprehensive solo exhibition to his work. In the next year, Paglen took part in the Istanbul Biennial, and in 2010 he exhibited at the Vienna Secession.

Autonomy Cube was a project by Paglen and Jacob Appelbaum that placed relays for the anonymous communication network Tor in traditional art museums.

He contributed to the Oscar-winning documentary film Citizenfour (2014), directed by Laura Poitras.

Paglen features in the nerd-culture documentary Traceroute (2016).

Orbital Reflector was a reflective, mylar sculpture by Paglen intended to be the first "purely artistic" object in space. The temporary satellite, containing an inflatable mylar balloon with reflective surface, launched into space 3 December 2018.

A mid-career survey in 2018–2019, Trevor Paglen: Sites Unseen, was a traveling exhibition shown at the Smithsonian American Art Museum in Washington DC and the Museum of Contemporary Art San Diego.

In September 2020, Pace Gallery in London held an exhibition of Paglen's work, exploring "the weird, partial ways computers look back at us".

His work is included in the permanent collections of the San Francisco Museum of Modern Art, the Columbus Museum of Art, and the Metropolitan Museum.

=== Experimental Geography ===
Paglen is credited with coining the term "Experimental Geography" to describe practices coupling experimental cultural production and art-making with ideas from critical human geography about the production of space, materialism, and praxis. The 2009 book Experimental Geography: Radical Approaches to Landscape, Cartography, and Urbanism is largely inspired by Paglen's work.

== Publications ==
Paglen has published a number of books. Torture Taxi (2006) (co-authored with investigative journalist A. C. Thompson) was the first book to comprehensively describe the CIA's extraordinary rendition program. I Could Tell You But Then You Would Have to be Destroyed by Me (2007), is a look at the world of black projects through unit patches and memorabilia created for top-secret programs. Blank Spots on the Map: The Dark Geography of the Pentagon's Secret World (2009) is a broader look at secrecy in the United States. The Last Pictures (2012) is a collection of 100 images to be placed on permanent media and launched into space on EchoStar XVI, as a repository available for future civilizations (alien or human) to find.

=== Publications by Paglen ===
- I Could Tell You But Then You Would Have to be Destroyed by Me. Brooklyn, NY: Melville House, 2007. ISBN 1-933633-32-8.
- Blank Spots on the Map: The Dark Geography of the Pentagon's Secret World. New York: Dutton, 2009. ISBN 9781101011492.
- Invisible: Covert Operations and Classified Landscapes, Photographs by Trevor Paglen. New York: Aperture, 2010. ISBN 9781597111300. With an essay by Rebecca Solnit.
- The Last Pictures. Oakland, CA: University of California, 2012. ISBN 9780520275003.
- Trevor Paglen. London: Phaidon, 2018. ISBN 0714873446. With essays by Laren Cornell, Julia Bryan-Wilson, Omar Kholeif.
- How to See Like a Machine: Images After AI. London: Verso, 2026. ISBN 9781836742166.

=== Publications co-authored ===
- Torture Taxi. Co-authored with A. C. Thompson. Brooklyn, NY: Melville House Publishing, 2006. ISBN 1-933633-09-3.
  - Icon, 2007. ISBN 9781840468304.

=== Publications with contributions by Paglen ===
- Experimental Geography: Radical Approaches to Landscape, Cartography, and Urbanism. Brooklyn, NY: Melville House, 2009. ISBN 978-0091636586. Edited by Nato Thompson. With essays by Paglen, Thompson, and Jeffrey Kastner.
- Trevor Paglen and Jacob Appelbaum – Autonomy Cube. Revolver, 2016. ISBN 978-3957633026. Essays by Luke Skrebowski and Keller Easterling on Autonomy Cube, a piece of sculpture by Paglen and Jacob Appelbaum. In English and German.

== Exhibitions ==
- Bellwether Gallery, New York, November–December 2006
- The Other Night Sky, Berkeley Art Museum, 2008
- A Compendium of Secrets, Cologne
- Still Revolution: Suspended in Time, Museum of Contemporary Canadian Art, Toronto, May–June 2009. Group exhibition with Paglen, Barbara Astman, Walead Beshty, Mat Collishaw, Stan Douglas, Idris Khan, Martha Rosler, and Mikhael Subotzky
- A Hidden Landscape, Aksioma, Ljubljana, Slowenia
- Geographies of Seeing, Lighthouse, Brighton, England, October–November 2012
- The Last Pictures, New York, 2012–13
- Trevor Paglen, Altman Siegel gallery, San Francisco, CA, March–May 2015
- The Octopus, Frankfurter Kunstverein, Frankfurt am Main, 2015
- Autonomy Cube, Edith-Russ-Haus, Oldenburg, Germany, October 2015 – January 2016. Sculpture by Paglen and Jacob Appelbaum.
- Deutsche Börse Photography Foundation Prize 2016, The Photographers' Gallery, London, April–July 2016. Deutsche Börse Photography Prize shortlist with Paglen, Erik Kessels, Laura El-Tantawy, and Tobias Zielony.
- Radical Landscapes, di Rosa, Napa, February–April 2016
- L’Image volée, Americas II, Bahamas Internet Cable System (BICS-1) and Globenet, Fondazione Prada, Milan (group exhibition), 2016
- A Study of Invisible Images, Metro Pictures, New York, September–October 2017

== Awards ==
- 2014: Pioneer Award from the Electronic Frontier Foundation.
- 2015: The Cultural Award from the German Society for Photography (DGPh)
- 2015: Academy Award as cameraman and director for the documentary film Citzenfour.
- 2016: Deutsche Börse Photography Foundation Prize
- 2017: MacArthur Fellowship, John D. and Catherine T. MacArthur Foundation, Chicago, IL
- 2018: Nam June Paik Art Center Prize
- 2026: LG Guggenheim Award

== Films about Paglen ==
- Unseen Skies (2021)

== Works ==
Free works of Trevor Paglen at Wikimedia Commons

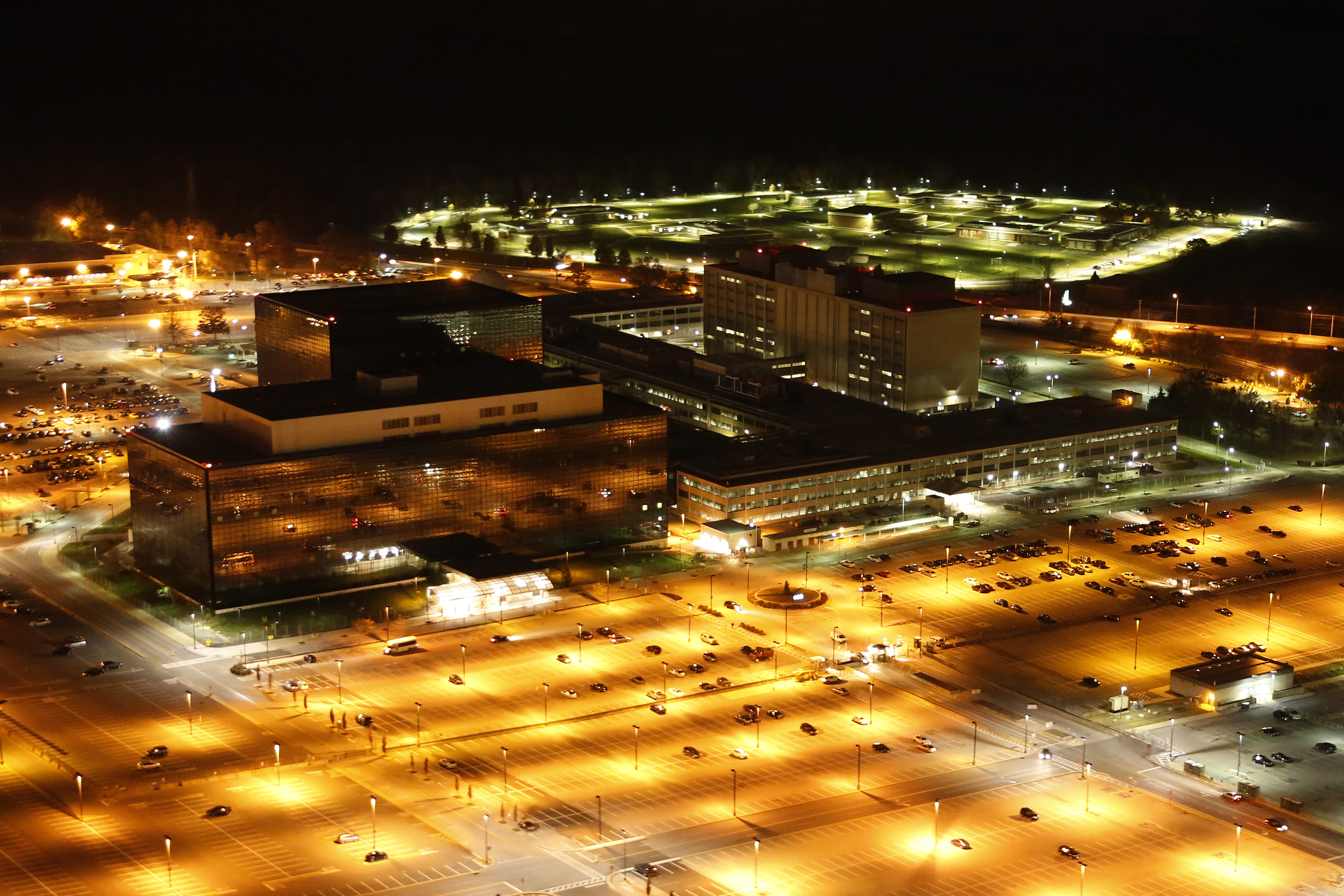
Headquarters of the National Security Agency on Fort Meade, Maryland

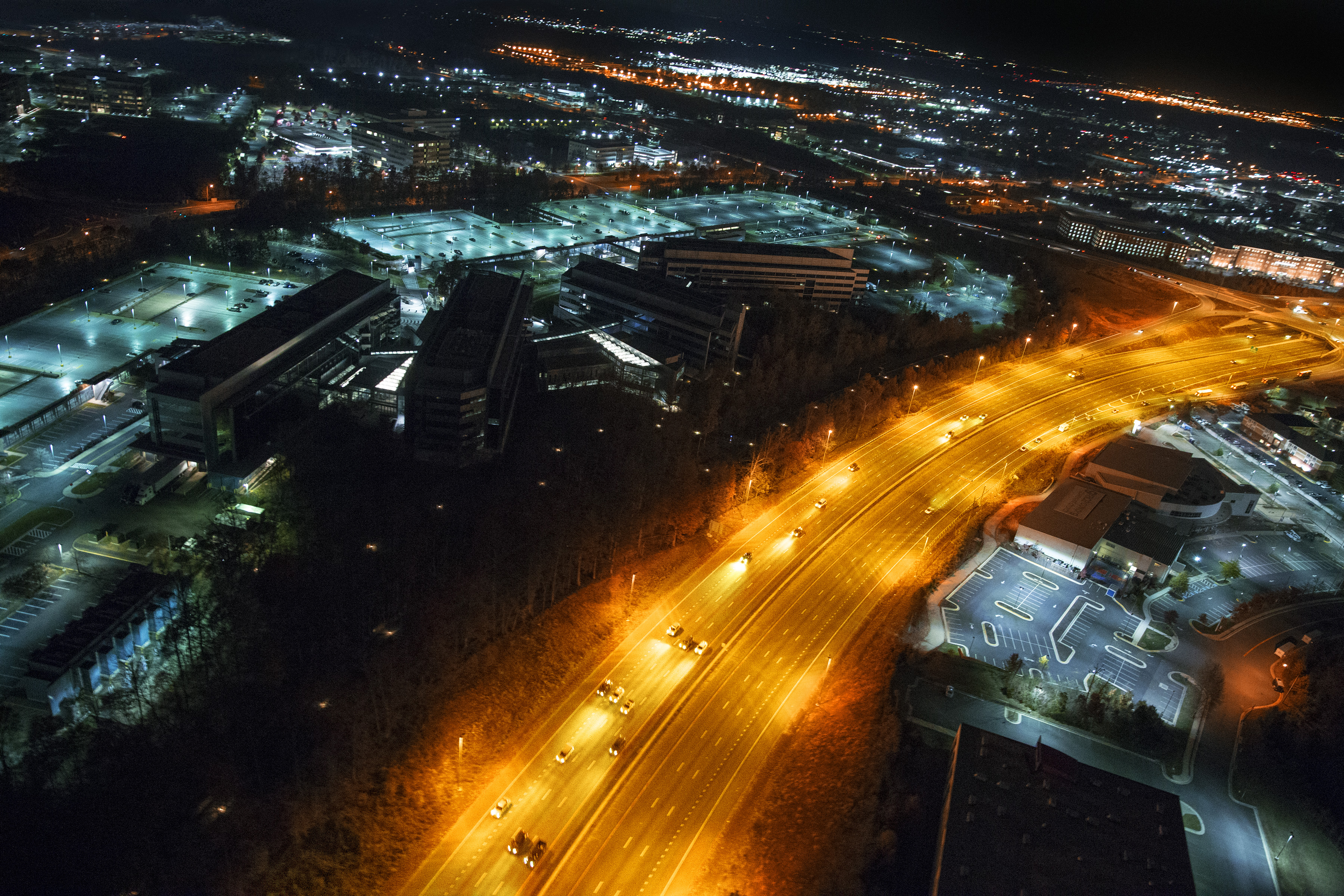
Headquarters of the National Reconnaissance Office in Chantilly, Virginia

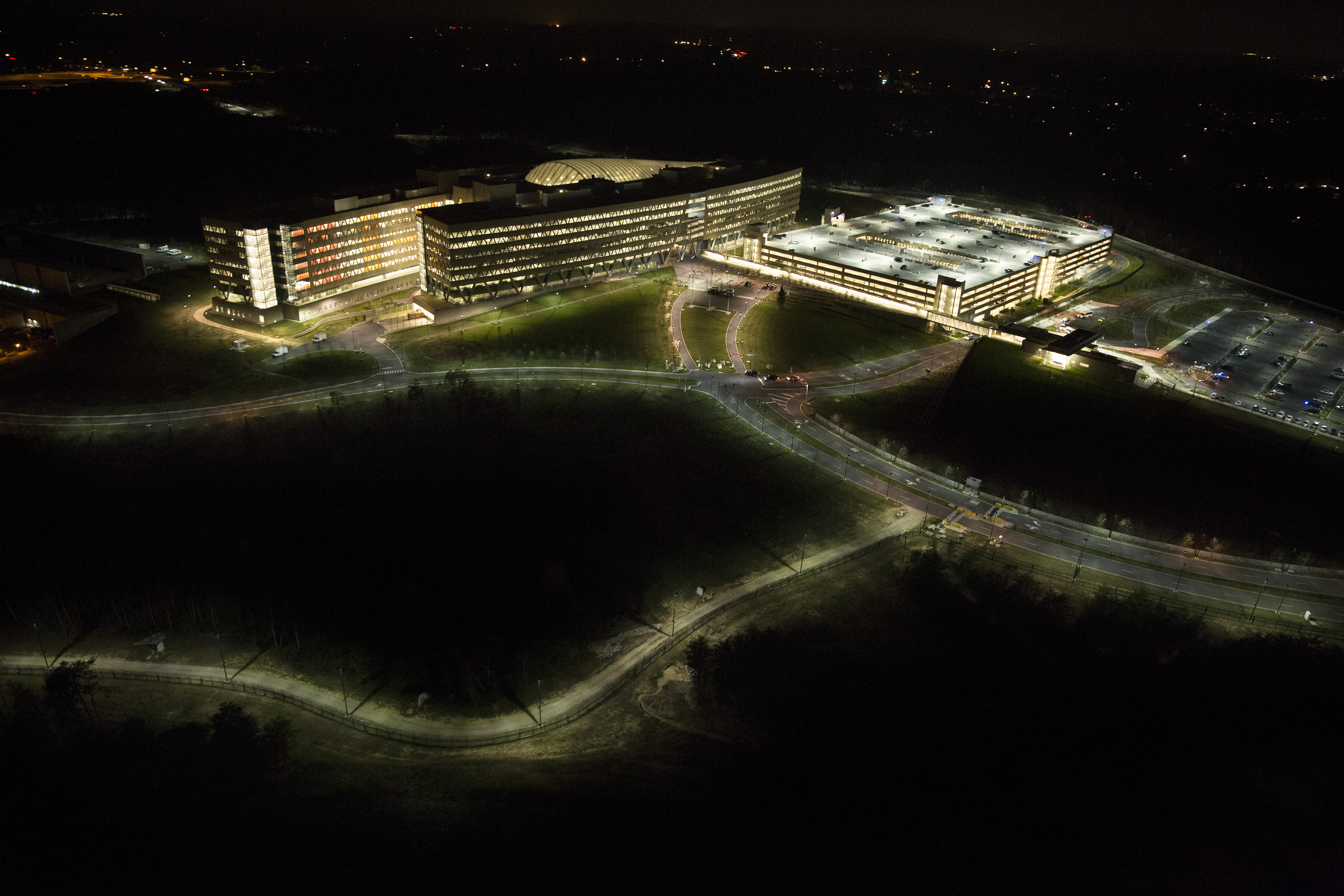
Headquarters of the National Geospatial-Intelligence Agency in Springfield, Virginia
