= Der Bevölkerung =

Inscription on the Reichstag, Berlin

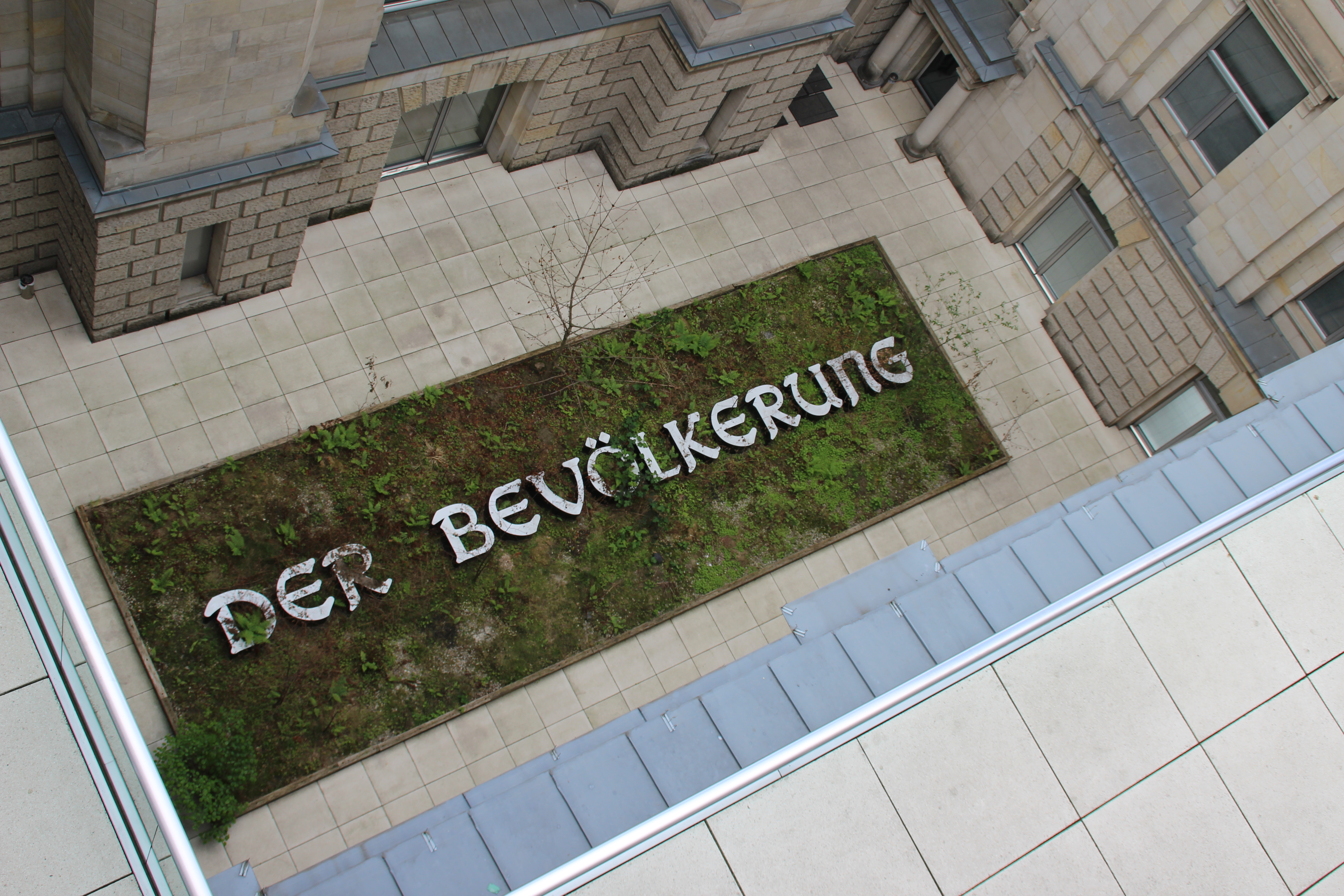

The artwork DER BEVÖLKERUNG by Hans Haacke was as commissioned and installed in 2000. It was erected in the north courtyard of the German Reichstag building in the year 2000 by resolution of the German Bundestag. The work consists of a trough measuring 21 x 7 meters, bounded by wooden beams, from the center of which the words "DER BEVÖLKERUNG" ("To the Population") radiate toward the sky in white neon letters. The words can be seen from all levels of the building: from the assembly hall, the floor reserved for the political parties and the press, as well as by visitors on the roof. The public funds allocated to the project were the equivalent of approx. 200,000 euros. The artwork was realized within the framework of the Reichstag's art in architecture program.

== Title ==
The title refers to the historic inscription "DEM DEUTSCHEN VOLKE" ("To the German People") affixed to the Reichstag building in 1916. This reference is underscored by the use of the same lettering designed by Peter Behrens at the time. Hans Haacke emphasizes the difference in meaning between "Volk" (people) and "Bevölkerung" (population): the latter includes all people who live in a country. A key source of inspiration for the project was a statement by Bertolt Brecht:

In our times, anyone who says 'population' instead of 'people' [...] is by that simple act refusing to support a great many lies.

Members of the German Bundestag are invited to bring soil from their constituency and deposit it in the spaces around the lettering. The plants grow from seeds that have landed by chance on the work or which are contained in the soil contributions. The biotope, which has come into being over time, is to remain untouched.

In another work, titled We (all) are the people, and conceived for Documenta 14 in 2017, Hans Haacke takes up the terminology and the associated debates. Since then, the work has been shown internationally several times in the form of flags and banners, and adapted to each site accordingly.

== Controversies ==
=== Members of the German Bundestag before the vote ===
The political nature of the artwork sparked controversy. Volker Kauder, was the only member of the art committee of the German Bundestag to oppose the work:

I say "no" to this simple work of art, unworthy of our house. I say "no" to the fact that an attempt is being made to belittle the German people, to reduce it to a short period of its history. I say ‘no’ to the attempt to distance the German Bundestag from its own people.

In the Bundestag, members of the CDU in particular, such as Norbert Lammert, but also Antje Vollmer of the Green Party, who was then Vice President of the Bundestag, initially opposed the artwork's acquisition. According to Lammert, it was a “bizarre federal garden show” and a “silliness”, adding that if Bundestag members were to be involved in practical matters, they should also be allowed to discuss them.

Gert Weisskirchen (SPD) championed the work:

Here, the dedications "to the German people" and "to the population" are not diametrically opposed; both concepts are placed in relation to each other in order to engage in dialogue on the question: What kind of a society do we want to live in, in the future? That's what the artist is trying to tell us.

For the FDP politician Ulrich Heinrich, Haacke's work of art symbolizes the transition from jus sanguinis to jus soli.

Haacke's work raises questions of a highly political nature, according to Wolfgang Thierse, then president of the German Bundestag and one of the project's main supporters:

They aim at the ethos of the parliamentarian, asking what norms he is committed to and what responsibility he feels he has toward people living in our country.

According to Thierse, what is important is that viewers develop their own position and think critically about Haacke's project. A cross-party group motion against the erection of the work of art was ultimately rejected by 260 votes to 258.

Up to the current legislative period (June 2020), about 400 Bundestag members from all political groups have participated by depositing soil from their constituencies into the artwork.

=== Comments from the media and general population ===
In a commentary, the Frankfurter Allgemeine Zeitung accused Haacke of wanting to "take away" the Bundestag from the German people, and that the work was unconstitutional – a judgement that was also reached by a legal opinion commissioned by the CDU.

That each member of the Bundestag should pour a sack of earth from his constituency into a trough was evaluated by aesthetes among Haacke's critics as being akin to a "kitschy church day community ritual"; other critics saw it "as a problematic reminiscence of Nazi soil rituals."

The Bundesverband Bildender Künstlerinnen und Künstler (Federal Association of Fine Artists) criticized the fact that it was not the Bundestag's art committee but the German Bundestag that was taking the final decision regarding the artwork's acquisition; that individual members of parliament were trying “by means of plenary votes to win a majority based on judgements of personal taste, particularly regarding Hans Haacke’s artwork, and thus to refer decisions on the quality of artworks to an incompetent body, namely the plenary of the German Bundestag.”

== Copyright of the artwork ==
The artwork later attracted unexpected online attention when a photo of the installation was forbidden by the artist to be shown on a private website. Via the German copyright agency VG Bild-Kunst, Haacke denied the blog owner the right to present a photographic reproduction of his work on the internet. While the artist is legally entitled to this under German copyright law (a general right to present photographs of artworks in public exists only insofar as these artworks are in public space; the interior of the Reichstag building is not considered public space), online comments repeatedly point out how the legal action contradicts the message expressed by the artwork itself.
