= Orbital Reflector =

2018 sculpture and passive satellite by Trevor Paglen

- Artist: Trevor Paglen
- Year: 2018
- Website: www.orbitalreflector.com

Orbital Reflector is a reflective, mylar sculpture by Trevor Paglen launched into space as a temporary satellite. Co-produced by the Nevada Museum of Art, the $1.3 million project had the objective of being the first "purely artistic" object in space. The satellite, containing an inflatable mylar balloon with reflective surface, launched into space 3 December 2018.

Orbital Reflector launched on Monday, December 3, at 10:34 a.m. EST on board the SpaceX Spaceflight SSO-A: SmallSat Express.

Originally it was expected to remain in orbit for three months, after which it would disintegrate upon reentry to the Earth's atmosphere. However, the deployment was delayed by the 2018–2019 United States federal government shutdown — by the time the 35-day shutdown had ended, the museum's engineers had lost contact with the satellite, the electronics and hardware of which "were not hardened for long-term functionality in space".

It became lost in orbit, constituting space junk.

== See also ==
- Humanity Star, a passive satellite to reflect flares visible from Earth
- Znamya (satellite)
- Reflect Orbital
