= World Tomorrow =

- Also known as: عالم الغد, El Mundo del Mañana, The Julian Assange Show
- Genre: Political talk show
- Created by: Julian Assange
- Presented by: Julian Assange
- Theme music composer: M.I.A.
- Original languages: English; Arabic; Russian; Spanish
- No. of seasons: 1
- No. of episodes: 12

Production
- Production location: Ellingham Hall, Norfolk
- Camera setup: Multi-camera
- Running time: 26 minutes
- Production companies: Quick Roll Productions; Dartmouth Films

Original release
- Network: RT
- Release: 17 April – 3 July 2012

World Tomorrow, or The Julian Assange Show, is a 2012 television program series of 26-minute political interviews hosted by WikiLeaks founder and editor Julian Assange and funded by RT, the Kremlin-controlled media outlet. Twelve episodes were shot prior to the program's premiere. It first aired on RT on 17 April 2012, the 500th day of the "financial blockade" of WikiLeaks, and last aired on 3 July 2012.

== List of episodes ==
# (Note: Original weekly transmission order on RT. "Cypherpunks" was transmitted in slots 8/9. The later transmission slots numbered 10–12 are alternatively referenced as episodes 9–11 in some locations.)	Episode title	Originally aired	Guest(s)	Ref.
1	Nasrallah	17 April 2012	Hassan Nasrallah	
2	Horowitz-Zizek	24 April 2012	Slavoj Žižek; David Horowitz	
3	Marzouki	1 May 2012	Moncef Marzouki	
4	Alaa-Nabeel	8 May 2012	Alaa Abd El-Fattah; Nabeel Rajab	
5	Cageprisoners	15 May 2012	Moazzam Begg; Asim Qureshi	
6	Correa	22 May 2012	Rafael Correa	
7	Occupy	29 May 2012	David Graeber; Marisa Holmes; Alexa O'Brien; Aaron Peters; Naomi Colvin	
8	Cypherpunks 1	5 June 2012	Andy Müller-Maguhn; Jérémie Zimmermann; Jacob Appelbaum	
9	Cypherpunks 2	12 June 2012	Andy Müller-Maguhn; Jérémie Zimmermann; Jacob Appelbaum	
10	Khan	19 June 2012	Imran Khan	
11	Chomsky-Ali	26 June 2012	Noam Chomsky; Tariq Ali	
12	Anwar	3 July 2012	Anwar Ibrahim	

== Production ==
The show is produced by Quick Roll Productions, which was established by Julian Assange with the assistance of Dartmouth Films. It is distributed by Journeyman Pictures and broadcast internationally in English, Arabic, and Spanish by RT and Italian newspaper L'espresso, who both make the program available online. The theme for the show was composed by M.I.A.

Margarita Simonyan, editor-in-chief of RT, told the daily Moskovskii Komsomolets that Assange will resume making shows and allowing them to be broadcast on Russian television once his legal troubles are over.

== Reception ==
In his The New York Times blog, Robert Mackey called RT "a strange partner" for Assange while Robert Colvile inveighed Assange's show by writing, "After Wikileaks – and its mission to change the world – collapsed under the weight of its leader’s ego, Assange started hosting a TV show sponsored by that noted friend of freedom, Vladimir Putin." In an article for The Guardian, Luke Harding described the show as proof that Assange was a "useful idiot". Another article in The Guardian by Miriam Elder said that it was doubtful Russian "revolutionaries" will make the show's guestlist and reported a tweet by Alexander Lebedev lambasting Assange, tweeting that it was, "Hard to imagine [a] more miserable final[e] for [a] 'world order challenger' than employee of state-controlled 'Russia Today'." New York magazine called the show a letdown and said "it wasn't even interesting" and that "the most charged few seconds of the broadcast" was the theme song.

Glenn Greenwald of Salon magazine praised the show and condemned the detractors writing for The New York Times and The Guardian. At the end of the season, Tracy Quan wrote an article called "I Love the Julian Assange Show!", describing the show as "addictive, lively, wide-ranging, and informative".
