= Autonomy Cube =

Tor-related art project

Autonomy cube
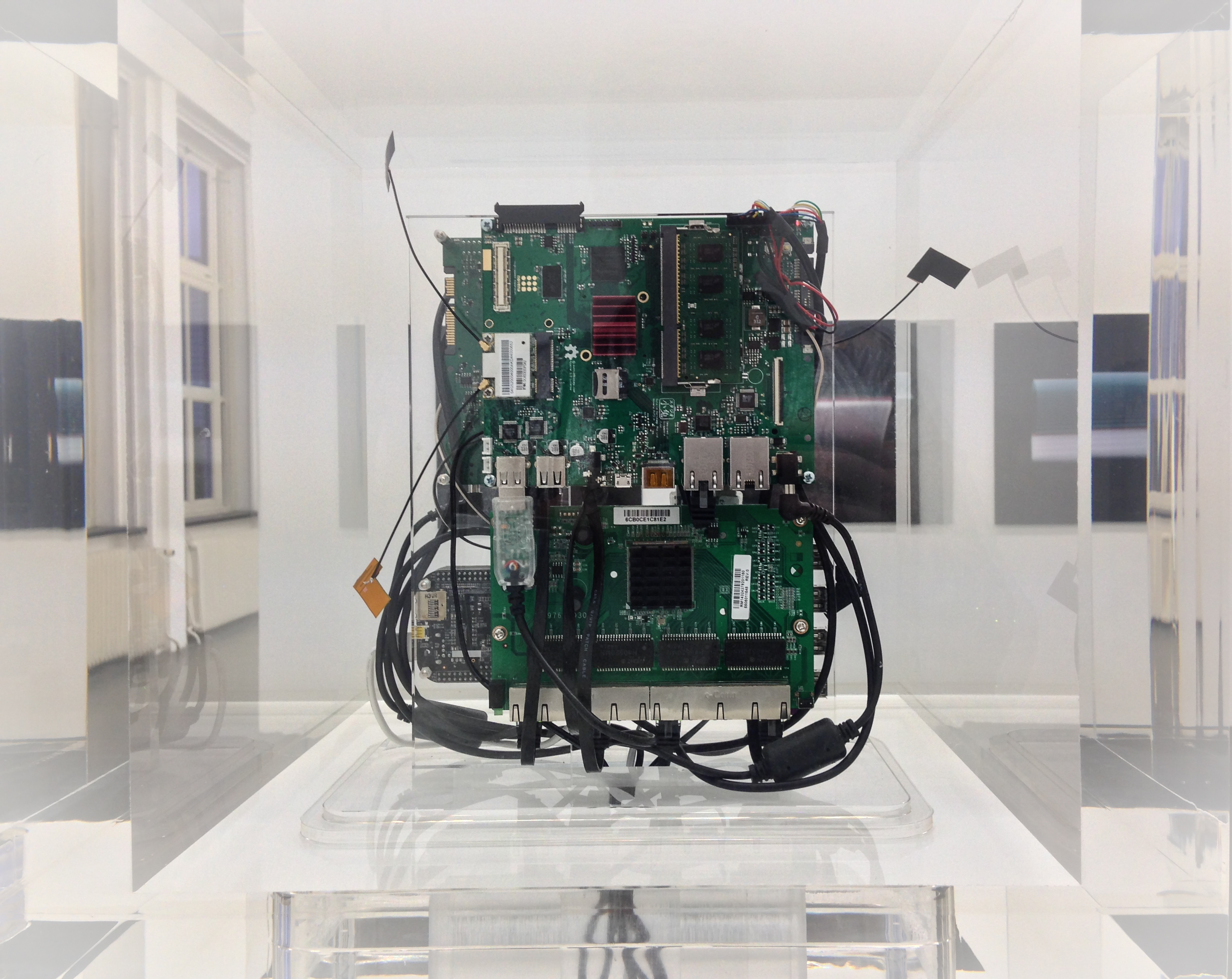
- One of the Autonomy Cubes on display as part of Art In The Age Of…Planetary Computation (2015) at Witte de With Center for Contemporary Art.
- Artist: Trevor Paglen, Jacob Appelbaum
- Year: 2014–2018
- Type: Sculpture
- Medium: Lucite, Novena motherboards

Hans Haacke's Condensation Cube, this one completed 2008; Plexiglas and water; Hirshhorn Museum and Sculpture Garden was an inspiration for the Autonomy Cube

The Autonomy Cube was an art project run by American artists and technologists Trevor Paglen and Jacob Appelbaum that places relays for the anonymous communication network Tor in traditional art museums. Both have previously created art pieces that straddle the border between art and technology.

The cube is in line with much of Paglen's and Appelbaum's earlier pieces in targeting the field of surveillance and government snooping. The sculptures consist of 1.25 ft blocks of acrylic Lucite containing Wifi-routers based upon two open source hardware Novena-motherboards.

== Overview ==
The first sculpture was installed in Oldenburg, Germany in 2014 and acts as both a Tor exit-relay and Wifi-hub for visitors of the museum. Any user who connects to the museum open Wifi called Autonomy Cube is directed through the Tor-network for all their activity. This effectively anonymizes and hides the traffic from many forms of surveillance and interception.

In January 2016, four installations had been made in New York, London and Frankfurt, beyond the one in Oldenburg. More sculptures are planned, with three coming during May 2016, one at Altman Siegel Gallery in San Francisco. Institutions that have shown the cube in limited exhibitions include Metro Pictures Gallery on Manhattan which exhibited Paglen's work, Whitechapel Gallery in London as part of the Electronic Superhighway (2016–1966) exhibition and the Smithsonian American Art Museum in Trevor Paglen: Sites Unseen.

The willingness of museums to host these installations was a surprise, says Paglen, who hopes the relays can play a potentially important role in the Tor network. Omar Kholeif at Whitechapel Gallery has commented on the idea that "when we enter civic institutions we expect them to have Wi-Fi, [and] we just hand over our data", and how the Cubes bring this agreement forth to discussion.

Inspiration for the Cube came from a 1962 art project by Hans Haacke called Condensation Cube. It similarly consisted of a plexiglass cube but instead contained water that would move through different states of liquid to gas. Paglen also states he wants to raise the question: "What would a more civic-minded version of the Internet look like? What could the Internet look like if the Internet hadn't been turned into the greatest means of mass surveillance in the history of humanity?"

== See also ==
- Torservers.net
