= Julia Neuhaus =

German economist

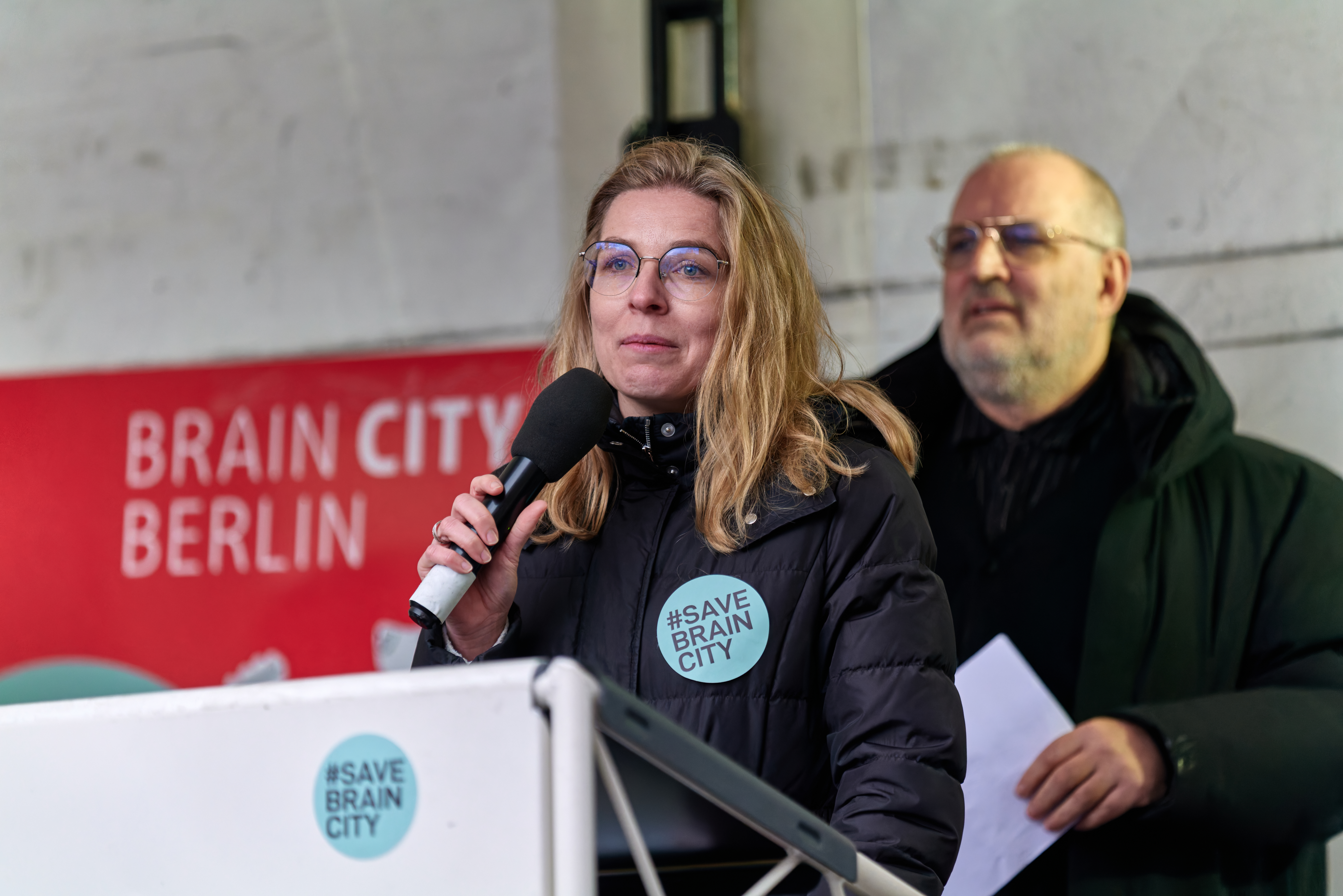

Julia Neuhaus (formerly Julia Reilich, * 1983) is a German economist. Since October 2023 she has been the president of the Berliner Hochschule für Technik (BHT).

== Education ==
Julia Neuhaus began her studies in 2002 at the University of Potsdam Economics in 2002 and completed her intermediate diploma in 2005. She completed her master's degree at the University of Wisconsin-Milwaukee the following year. Her master's thesis was awarded the university's Richard Perlman Prize.

She then moved back to the University of Potsdam, where she worked as a research assistant and lecturer in statistics, economic theory and accounting. She completed her doctorate with the dissertation on the regional return on education with distinction in 2012. In 2012, she received the Young Scientist Award from the Gesellschaft für Regionalforschung (English: Society for Regional Research).

== Professional career ==
From 2013 to 2018, Neuhaus was managing director of the Verwaltungs- und Wirtschaftsakademie (English: Academy of Management and Economics) in Berlin and the German Open Business School as well as deputy site manager for the FOM University of Applied Sciences.

She then headed the Berlin Future Places office at WISTA Management GmbH.

In 2021, she became dean of the Department of Social Insurance at the Federal University of Applied Sciences for Public Administration and head of the Education Department at Deutsche Rentenversicherung Bund (English: German Federal Pension Insurance).

Neuhaus succeeded Werner Ullmann as president of the Berlin University of Applied Sciences in October 2023.

== Memberships ==
- Landeskonferenz der Rektor*innen und Präsident*innen der Berliner Hochschulen
  - Deputy chair of executive board
  - Speaker of Berlin Universities of Applied Sciences (since October 2024)
- Advisory board of Technologiestiftung Berlin (English: Berlin Technology Foundation)
- Verein für Socialpolitik
- Verein für Regionalökonomik

== Publications (selection) ==
- Bildungsrenditen in Deutschland : eine nationale und regionale Analyse, Universität Potsdam, 2013, ISBN 978-3-86956-219-3
- Smoking and Returns to Education - Empirical Evidence for Germany, Deutsches Institut für Wirtschaftsforschung e.V., Berlin, 2011
- Return to schooling in Germany, Universität Potsdam, 2006

=== As editor ===
- With Sascha Frohwerk: Eine Sonate der Ökonomie, Roderer Verlag, Regensburg, 2013, ISBN 978-3-89783-761-4
