= A. C. Thompson =

American journalist

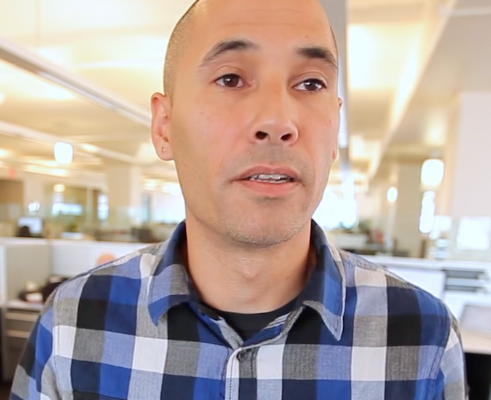
Thompson at the ProPublica offices in 2015.

A.C. Thompson (born c.1972) is an investigative journalist, producer, and senior reporter with ProPublica and a correspondent for the PBS series Frontline.

== Career ==
Before going into journalism, Thompson held many jobs, including pharmaceutical study test subject, trash collector, bike messenger, punk band roadie, and a martial arts fighter. He has traveled to Afghanistan, where he was reporting for a book written with Trevor Paglen, then a Ph.D graduate student at UC Berkeley.

Thompson has been a reporter for the San Francisco Bay Guardian, SF Weekly, and the Center for Investigative Reporting.

He has also been faculty at New College of California, an instructor in the Media Studies Graduate Program, and taught at the Raising Our Voices program, to train street reporters.

== Selected documentaries ==
Frontline/ProPublica Documentaries
Year	Air Date(s)	Title	Summary
2010	August 16 and 25	Law and Disorder	An investigation, in collaboration with The Times-Picayune/The New Orleans Advocate, into charges and the cover up of illegal use of force by the New Orleans Police Department against citizens.
2012	February 21, June 28	The Child Cases	An investigation, in collaboration with NPR, into deaths of children, for which people were wrongly convicted or imprisoned based on unreliable or wrong medical evidence.
2013	July 30, September 24	Life and Death in Assisted Living	An investigation into Emeritus Senior Living, the largest assisted-living company in the United States.
2015	August 15, November 3	Terror in Little Saigon	An investigation into unsolved murders of Vietnamese-American journalists.
2018	August 7	Documenting Hate: Charlottesville	An investigation into the 2017 Unite the Right rally and the under-preparedness of the local law enforcement.
2018	February 4, June 18, November 20	Documenting Hate: New American Nazis	An investigation following the Pittsburgh synagogue shooting, focusing on American white supremacist groups, specifically Atomwaffen Division.
2021	April 13	American Insurrection (2021)	An investigation, in collaboration with Berkeley Journalism's Investigative Reporting Program, into far-right extremist groups (e.g., the Proud Boys, Oath Keepers) following the 2017 Charlottesville car attack and rally.
2022	January 4	American Insurrection (2022)	An update of the original, including more recent events.
2022	March 29	Plot to Overturn the Election	An investigation into the misinformation and causes that led to the January 6 United States Capitol attack.
2023	June 13	America's Dangerous Trucks	An investigation into deadly accidents between passenger vehicles and large trucks (e.g., Semi-trailer truck).

== Awards ==
- 2005 George Polk Award for Local Reporting for his series “Forgotten City,” about San Francisco's public housing
- 2011 Emmy nominee for "Law & Disorder"
- 2011 I.F. Stone Medal for Journalistic Independence
- 2012 Emmy nominee for "Child Cases"
- 2013 Elijah Parish Lovejoy Award for investigative journalism in connection with the shooting of civilians by police after Hurricane Katrina.
- 2013 Honorary Doctorate from Colby College
- 2016 Emmy nominee for "Terror in Little Saigon"
- 2019 Emmy winner for "Documenting Hate"
- 2019 Walter Cronkite Award for Excellent in Television Political Journalism for "Documenting Hate"
- 2021 Peabody Award nominee for News Coverage his work co-producing the "American Insurrection"
- 2022 Emmy nominee for Best Documentary and Outstanding Current Affairs Documentary for co-producing the "American Insurrection"
- 2024 Emmy nominee for his work co-producing, reporting and writing "America's Dangerous Trucks"

== Publications with others ==
- Torture Taxi. Co-authored with Trevor Paglen. Brooklyn, NY: Melville House Publishing, 2006. ISBN 1-933633-09-3.
  - Icon, 2007. ISBN 9781840468304.
