= BuggedPlanet =

- Available in: English
- Creator: Andy Müller-Maguhn
- Website: www.buggedplanet.info
- Commercial: No
- Launched: 2011
- Current status: Online

BuggedPlanet.info is a wiki created in 2011 by Andy Müller-Maguhn, former spokesman of the Chaos Computer Club, that tries to list and track down the activities of the surveillance industry in the fields of "Lawful interception", Signals intelligence (SIGINT), Communications intelligence (COMINT) as well as tactical and strategical measures used to intercept communications and the vendors and governmental and private operators of this technology.

The site maintains a list of vendors of cyberweapons and surveillance technologies as well as a "country knowledgebase" that aims to accumulate country-specific news, activities and vendors on the topic. A special focus is placed on vendors that sell such technologies to undemocratic countries and related lobbying efforts.

== The Spy Files ==
In December 2011 Privacy International and WikiLeaks collaborated with BuggedPlanet when they released documents collected from a number of surveillance trade shows and conferences included brochures, catalogues, technical specifications, contracts and pricelists for the products of around 160 companies.

== See also ==
- Cyber-arms industry
- Mass surveillance industry
- WikiLeaks
