= Andy Müller-Maguhn =

German hacker (born 1971)

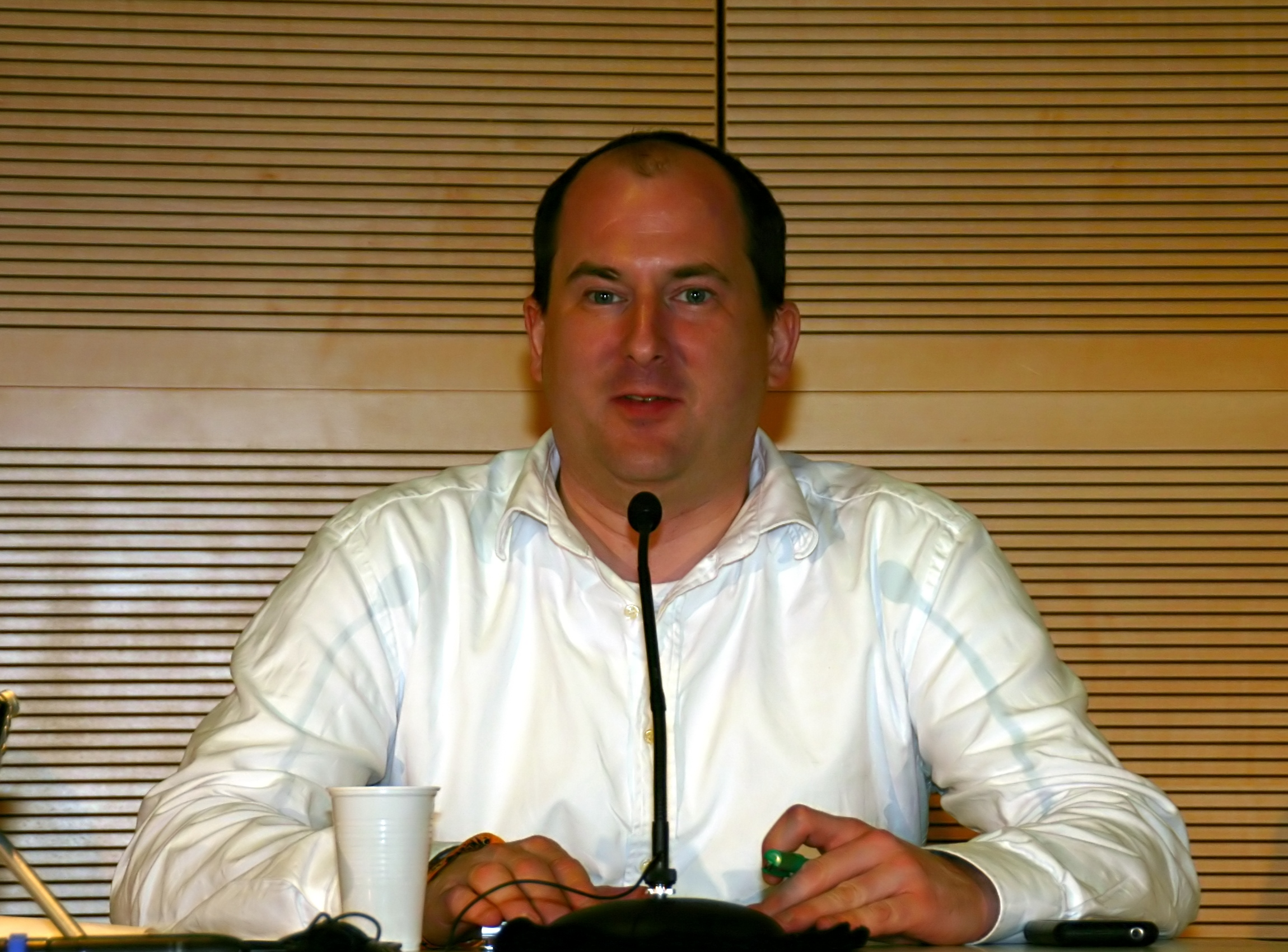
- Müller-Maguhn at the May 22, 2009 SIGINT conference
- Born: 3 October 1971 (age 55)
- Occupation: Hacker
- Known for: Former spokesman of the Chaos Computer Club

Andy Müller-Maguhn (born 3 October 1971) is a member of the German hacker association Chaos Computer Club (CCC). Having been a member since 1986, he was appointed as a spokesman for the club in 1990, and later served on its board until 2012. He runs a company that develops cryptophones.

In an election in Autumn 2000, he was voted in as an at-large director of ICANN, which made him jointly responsible with 18 other directors for the worldwide development of guidelines and the decision of structural questions for the Internet structure.

In 1995, Müller-Maguhn founded the "Datenreisebüro" ('Data Travel Agency'), based in a Berlin office since 2002.

In 2005 and 2006, Müller-Maguhn was involved on the side of the parents of the deceased hacker Boris Floricic, better known as Tron, in the case where they sought to prevent German Wikipedia from disclosing his true name, although the name had appeared in many press accounts by that point in time.

As of 2018, Müller-Maguhn runs a data center, does advocacy, and security consulting for companies and governments. His work has taken him around the world, including Moscow, where he attended a security conference organized by the Russian Ministry of Defence in 2016 and 2017, London and Brazil.

== Relationship with Julian Assange and WikiLeaks ==
In 2011, Müller-Maguhn was criticized for his role in the CCC board's controversial decision to expel former WikiLeaks spokesman Daniel Domscheit-Berg, which was often attributed to Müller-Maguhn's close relation to Wikileaks founder Julian Assange and an ongoing conflict between Assange and Domscheit-Berg. At a general meeting in February 2012, this decision was reverted, while Müller-Maguhn was not reelected to the board.

In 2011, Müller-Maguhn's company Bugged Planet worked with WikiLeaks on the Spy Files release. Forbes suggested that Müller-Maguhn and Bugged Planet might be WikiLeaks' source for the Spy Files.

The Mueller Report inferred that Müller-Maguhn may have assisted with transferring the DNC emails or the Podesta emails to WikiLeaks. In 2016, he delivered a USB to Assange, which he said contained personal messages for Assange, who had stopped using email. In July 2016, on the same day "Guccifer 2.0" sent Wikileaks encrypted files, Müller-Maguhn and Wau Holland board member Bernd Fix met with Assange for over four hours. According to The Washington Post, a former WikiLeaks associate said that, in 2016, Müller-Maguhn and a colleague oversaw submissions to WikiLeaks server. Müller-Maguhn said he did not oversee submissions.

Müller-Maguhn was an alleged target of UC Global's surveillance of Julian Assange in the embassy.

Müller-Maguhn is vice president for the Wau Holland Foundation and a member of the Advisory Board for the Courage Foundation.

He appeared with Julian Assange on Episode 8 and 9 of The World Tomorrow, "Cypherpunks: 1/2".

He is a contributor to Julian Assange's 2012 book Cypherpunks: Freedom and the Future of the Internet along with Jacob Appelbaum and Jérémie Zimmermann.
