= Jérémie Zimmermann =

French computer science engineer

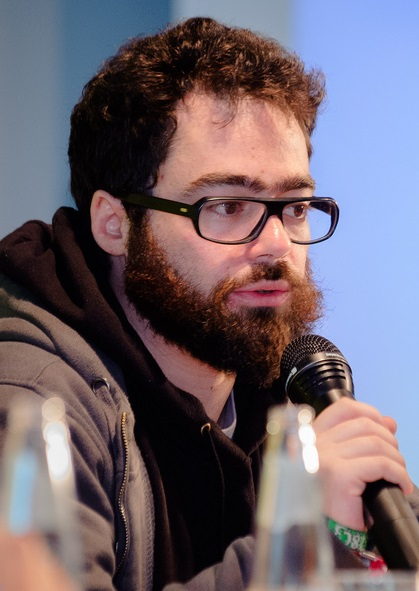
Zimmermann in 2013

Jérémie Zimmermann (born 1978) is a French computer science engineer and co-founder of the Paris-based La Quadrature du Net, a citizen advocacy group defending fundamental freedoms online. He is a co-founder of Hacking With Care, a "collective composed of hackers-activists, caregivers, artists, sociologist, growing quite literally by contact and affinity".

== Life ==
He appeared with Julian Assange on Episode 8 and Episode 9 of The World Tomorrow, "Cypherpunks: 1/2".

He is a contributor to Assange's 2012 book Cypherpunks: Freedom and the Future of the Internet along with Jacob Appelbaum and Andy Müller-Maguhn (OR Books, ISBN 978-1-939293-00-8).

== Awards ==
He was awarded the 2012 EFF Pioneer Award, together with other people and groups.
