= United States v. Manning =

2013 court-martial case

- Court: United States Army Military District of Washington
- Full case name: United States of America v. Manning, Bradley E., PFC

Case history
- Prior actions: Article 32 hearing, opened December 16, 2011; Formally charged, February 23, 2012; Article 39 (pre-trial) hearing, opened April 24, 2012

Court membership
- Judge sitting: Colonel Denise Lind

United States v. Manning was the court-martial of Chelsea Manning, a former United States Army Private First Class. (Note: At the time known as Bradley Manning.)

After serving in Iraq since October 2009, Manning was arrested in May 2010 after Adrian Lamo, a computer hacker in the United States, indirectly informed the Army's Criminal Investigation Command that Manning had acknowledged passing classified material to WikiLeaks. Manning was ultimately charged with 22 specified offenses, including communicating national defense information to an unauthorized source, and the most serious of the charges, aiding the enemy. Other charges included violations of the Espionage Act of 1917, stealing U.S. government property, charges under the Computer Fraud and Abuse Act of 1986 and charges related to the failure to obey lawful general orders under Article 92 of the Uniform Code of Military Justice. Manning entered guilty pleas to 10 of 22 specified offenses in February 2013.

The trial on the 12 remaining charges began on June 3, 2013. It went to the judge on July 26, 2013, and findings were rendered on July 30. Manning was acquitted of the most serious charge, that of aiding the enemy, for giving secrets to WikiLeaks. In addition to five or six espionage counts, Manning was also found guilty of five theft specifications, two computer fraud specifications and multiple military infractions.

On August 21, 2013, Manning was sentenced to 35 years' imprisonment, reduction in pay grade to E-1, forfeiture of all pay and allowances, and a dishonorable discharge. On January 17, 2017, President Barack Obama commuted Manning's sentence to a total of seven years' confinement. Manning was released on May 17, 2017. On May 31, 2018, the U.S. Army Court of Criminal Appeals upheld Manning's conviction of violating the Espionage Act of 1917.

== Background ==
The material includes 251,287 United States diplomatic cables, over 400,000 classified army reports from the Iraq War (the Iraq War logs), and approximately 90,000 army reports from the war in Afghanistan (the Afghan War logs). WikiLeaks also received two videos. One was of the July 12, 2007, Baghdad airstrike (dubbed the "Collateral Murder" video); the second, which was never published, was of the May 2009 Granai airstrike in Afghanistan.

Manning was charged on July 5, 2010, with violations of Articles 92 and 134 of the Uniform Code of Military Justice, which were alleged to have taken place between November 19, 2009, and May 27, 2010. These were replaced on March 1, 2011, with 22 specifications, including aiding the enemy, wrongfully causing intelligence to be published on the Internet knowing that it was accessible to the enemy, theft of public property or records, and transmitting defense information. Manning was found not guilty of aiding the enemy, the most serious charge, for which Manning could have faced the death penalty or life imprisonment.

== Pre-trial hearings ==
=== Article 32 hearing ===
Manning was represented by David Coombs.

A panel of experts ruled in April 2011 that Manning was fit to stand trial. An Article 32 hearing, presided over by Lieutenant Colonel Paul Almanza, was convened on December 16, 2011, at Fort Meade, Maryland, to determine whether to proceed to a court martial. The army was represented by Captains Ashden Fein, Joe Morrow, and Angel Overgaard. Manning was represented by military attorneys Major Matthew Kemkes and Captain Paul Bouchard, and by civilian attorney David Coombs.

The hearing resulted in Almanza recommending that Manning be referred to a general court-martial, and on February 3, 2012, the convening authority, Major General Michael Linnington, commander of the Military District of Washington, ordered Manning to stand trial on all 22 specified charges, including aiding the enemy. Manning was arraigned on February 23, and declined to enter a plea.

==== Prosecution evidence ====
The lead prosecutor, Captain Fein, argued that Manning had given enemies "unfettered access" to the material and had displayed an "absolute indifference" to classified information. He showed the court a video of Adam Gadahn, an al-Qaeda spokesman, referencing the leaked material.

The prosecution presented 300,000 pages of documents in evidence, including chat logs and classified material. Nicks writes that Manning appeared to have taken few security precautions. After Manning's arrest, detectives searched a basement room in Potomac, Maryland, and found an SD card they say contained the Afghan and Iraq War logs, along with a message to WikiLeaks. Investigators said Manning had also left computer trails of Google and Intelink searches, and of using Wget to download documents.

Lieutenant Colonel Almanza heard from two army investigators, Special Agent David Shaver, head of the digital forensics and research branch of the army's Computer Crime Investigative Unit (CCIU), and Mark Johnson, a digital forensics contractor from ManTech International, who works for the CCIU. They testified that they had found 100,000 State Department cables on a computer Manning had used between November 2009 and May 2010; 400,000 U.S. military reports from Iraq and 91,000 from Afghanistan on the SD card; and 10,000 cables on a personal MacBook Pro and storage devices that they said had not been passed to WikiLeaks because a file was corrupted. They also said they had recovered an exchange from May 2010 between Manning and Eric Schmiedl, a Boston mathematician, in which Manning had admitted to being the source of the Baghdad helicopter attack ("Collateral Murder") video.

Johnson said he found a text file called wl-press.txt on an external hard drive in Manning's room in Iraq. The file was created on November 30, 2009, and gave the contact detail in Iceland for WikiLeaks. He said he also recovered 14–15 pages of encrypted chats, in unallocated space on Manning's MacBook's hard drive, between Manning and someone believed to be Julian Assange, using the Adium instant messaging client. The MacBook's log-in password was found to be the encryption key. Two of the chat handles, which used the Berlin Chaos Computer Club's domain (ccc.de), had names associated with them, Julian Assange and Nathaniel Frank. Johnson also said he found SSH logs on the MacBook that showed an SFTP connection, from an IP address that resolved to Manning's aunt's home, to a Swedish IP address with links to WikiLeaks. There was also a text file named "Readme" attached to the logs, apparently written by Manning:

Items of historical significance of two wars Iraq and Afghanistan Significant Activity, Sigacts, between 00001 January 2004 and 2359 31 December 2009 extracts from CSV documents from Department of Defense and CDNE database. These items have already been sanitized of any source identifying information.

You might need to sit on this information for 90 to 180 days to figure out how best to send and distribute such a large amount of data to a large audience and protect the source.

This is possibly one of the most significant documents of our time, removing the fog of war and revealing the true nature of 21st century assymmetric warfare.

Have a good day.

Johnson said there had been two attempts to delete material from the MacBook. The operating system was re-installed in January 2010, and on or around January 31 an attempt was made to erase the hard drive by doing a "zero-fill," which involves overwriting material with zeroes. This process was started, cancelled, then started again with a single pass. The material was recovered after the overwrite attempts from unallocated space.

==== Defense arguments ====
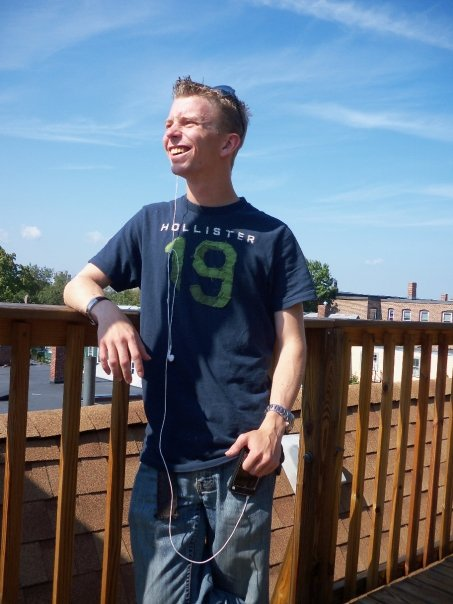
Manning in September 2009

The defense named 48 people it wanted to appear on Manning's behalf. The list was believed to include President Barack Obama and Secretary of State Hillary Clinton. Clinton had said that the diplomatic cables published by WikiLeaks "did not represent significant consequences to foreign policy." Obama was named because of an April 2011 statement that Manning "broke the law":

The defense requests the presence of [redacted] in order to discuss the issue of Unlawful Command Influence (UCI). Under Rule for Courts-Martial 405(e), the defense is entitled to explore the issue of UCI. Under the Uniform Code of Military Justice (UCMJ), a superior officer in the chain of command is prohibited from saying or doing anything that could influence any decision by a subordinate in how to handle a military justice matter.

Obama's statement was later echoed by the chairman of the Joint Chiefs of Staff, General Martin Dempsey, who said "We're a nation of laws. He did violate the law."

Manning's lawyers argued that the government had overstated the harm the release of the documents had caused, and had overcharged Manning in order to obtain evidence against Assange. They suggested that other people had had access to Manning's workplace computer, and under cross-examination Shaver acknowledged that some of the 10,000 cables on Manning's personal computer did not match cables published by WikiLeaks. Coombs asked for the dismissal of any charge related to the use of unauthorized software, arguing that Manning's unit had been "lawless ... when it comes to information assurance."

The defense also raised the issue of whether Manning's gender identity disorder had affected Manning's judgment. Manning had e-mailed master sergeant, Paul Adkins, in April 2010 to say she was suffering from gender confusion and, despite then living as a man, attaching a photograph of herself dressed as a woman. After Manning's arrest, the army found information about hormone replacement therapy in her room, and Manning's commander, Captain Steven Lim, learned that she had been calling herself Breanna. Defense lawyers argued that the superiors had failed to provide adequate counseling, and had not taken disciplinary action or revoked Manning's security clearance. They also suggested that the "don't ask, don't tell" policy—which was repealed in September 2011—had made it difficult for Manning to serve in the army as a gay man.

=== Defense request to depose six witnesses ===
After the hearing, in January 2012, Coombs filed a request to depose six witnesses, whose names were redacted in the application, and who are believed to have been involved in classifying the leaked videos. Coombs argues that the videos were not classified at the time they were obtained by WikiLeaks.

=== Article 39 hearing ===
An Article 39 hearing was convened on April 24, 2012, during which the judge, Colonel Denise Lind, denied a defense motion to dismiss the charge of aiding the enemy, and ruled that the government must be able to show that Manning knew the enemy would be able to access information on the WikiLeaks site. She ordered the CIA, FBI, DIA, State Department, and Department of Justice to release documents showing their assessment of whether the leaked material had damaged the national interest of the United States. Lind said she would decide after reading the documents whether to make them available to Manning's lawyers. She also ordered forensic imaging of five computers removed from Manning's work station that had not yet been wiped clean.

At the start of the hearing, Manning replaced the assigned two military defense lawyers, Major Matthew Kemkes and Captain Paul Bouchard, with Captain Joshua Tooman. The next Article 39 hearing was set for June 6–8 and trial was set for September 2012.

=== Petition to the Army Court of Criminal Appeals ===
The Center for Constitutional Rights filed a petition in May 2012 asking the Army Court of Criminal Appeals to order press and public access to motion papers, orders, and transcripts. Petitioners included Julian Assange, Amy Goodman of Democracy Now!, Chase Madar, author of The Passion of Bradley Manning (2011), and Glenn Greenwald of Salon.

=== Motion to dismiss ===
On September 19, 2012, Manning's attorneys filed a motion to dismiss all charges with prejudice, arguing that Manning had been unable to obtain a speedy trial. The motion said that the 845 days spent in pretrial confinement was longer than the periods that the law says is unreasonable (United States military law normally requires a trial within 120 days). Judge Lind ruled against the defense motion and allowed for the delay because the prosecution needed more time to prepare its case.

=== Initial plea ===
Audio recording of an excerpt of Manning's statement given on February 28, 2013

On February 28, 2013, Manning pleaded guilty to 10 of the 22 specified charges. Military judge Colonel Denise Lind accepted the guilty pleas, for which Manning could face up to 20 years in prison. Manning did not plead guilty to the most significant charge of aiding the enemy.

Manning acknowledged having provided archives of military and diplomatic files to WikiLeaks. She pleaded guilty to 10 criminal counts in connection with the material leaked, which included videos of airstrikes in Iraq and Afghanistan in which civilians were killed, logs of military incident reports, assessment files of detainees held at Guantánamo Bay, Cuba, and a quarter-million cables from American diplomats stationed around the world. Manning read a statement recounting how she joined the military, became an intelligence analyst in Iraq, decided that certain files should become known to the American public to prompt a wider debate about foreign policy, downloaded them from a secure computer network and then ultimately uploaded them to WikiLeaks.

When the judge asked Manning to explain how she could admit that her actions were wrong, Manning replied, "Your Honor, regardless of my opinion or my assessment of documents such as these, it's beyond my pay grade—it's not my authority to make these decisions about releasing confidential files." An audio recording of Manning's statement was released by journalist Glenn Greenwald on March 12, 2013.

Manning put the files on a camera digital storage card and took it home on a leave in early 2010. Manning then decided to give the files to a newspaper, first calling The Washington Post. Next, The New York Times was contacted and an unanswered voice mail message was left. In January 2010, Manning called the public editor's line at Bloomberg News, but got no response. Manning then copied the files and uploaded them to WikiLeaks, through its website, using a directory the group designated as a "cloud drop box" server. Manning was frustrated that WikiLeaks did not publish files about 15 people who printed "anti-Iraqi" pamphlets. After uploading the files, Manning was engaged in more online conversations with someone from WikiLeaks, who Manning thought was a senior figure, like Julian Assange. In retrospect, Manning described the relationship as "artificial."

== Trial ==
The trial began on June 3, 2013, at Fort Meade, Maryland, before Colonel Denise Lind, chief judge, U.S. Army Trial Judiciary, 1st Judicial Circuit.

Opening for the prosecution, Captain Joe Morrow accused Manning of having "harvested" hundreds of thousands of documents from secure networks, then making them available within hours to the US's enemies by dumping them on the Internet: "This is a case about what happens when arrogance meets access to classified information," he said. For the defense, Coombs described Manning as "young, naïve and good intentioned." Coombs recounted an incident in which a convoy was hit by an IED, which U.S. troops were relieved did not result in any American fatalities. Manning was reportedly disturbed by her comrades' lack of sympathy upon later learning that an Iraqi civilian had been killed in the incident. Coombs said that by releasing material she felt the public should see, Manning had hoped to make a difference. Manning additionally believed that much of the information she released was "already basically in the public domain," and that it was of historical importance.

On July 2, at the trial's 14th day of sessions, prosecutors rested their case, having presented testimony from 80 witnesses and evidence showing that Manning's training repeatedly instructed her to not give classified information to unauthorized people. The government also presented evidence that Osama bin Laden asked for and received from an associate the Afghanistan battlefield reports WikiLeaks published, and that al-Qaeda leaders reveled in WikiLeaks' publication of reams of classified U.S. documents, urging members to study them before devising ways to attack the United States.

On July 10, the defense rested its case after presenting evidence from 10 witnesses. Manning did not take the stand. Attempting to undercut the most serious charge against Manning—aiding the enemy—defense lawyers called Harvard Law School professor Yochai Benkler, who testified that until WikiLeaks started publishing the material Manning leaked, even the Pentagon apparently viewed the anti-secrecy website as a legitimate journalistic enterprise. Thereafter, said Benkler, the public, the military and traditional news media perceived WikiLeaks as a group that supported terrorism.

On July 18, Judge Lind rejected a defense motion to dismiss the charge of aiding the enemy, citing Manning's extensive training as an intelligence analyst and the sheer volume of records that were leaked as reasons to allow the charge to proceed. In its rebuttal case, the prosecution entered three tweets from WikiLeaks that Manning may have viewed to show that the organization was not a legitimate journalistic enterprise. In surrebuttal, the defense entered articles into evidence depicting WikiLeaks as an important journalism outlet, a platform "just as important as" the Freedom of Information Act (United States).

On July 25, chief prosecutor Maj. Ashden Fein delivered the government's closing argument, portraying Manning as an "anarchist" who sought to "make a splash" by providing vast archives of secret documents to WikiLeaks. Arguing that Manning must be found guilty of aiding the enemy, Fein said, "He was not a whistleblower. He was a traitor, a traitor who understood the value of compromised information in the hands of the enemy and took deliberate steps to ensure that they, along with the world, received it." Fein contended that Manning's "wholesale and indiscriminate compromise of hundreds of thousands of classified documents" for release by the WikiLeaks staff, whom he called "essentially information anarchists," was not an ordinary journalistic disclosure but a bid for "notoriety, although in a clandestine form." Fein addressed the court for nearly six hours.

The next day, defense attorney Coombs countered with his own closing argument, portraying Manning as "a young, naïve, but good-intentioned soldier who had human life and his humanist beliefs center to his decisions, whose sole focus was, 'Maybe I just can make a difference, maybe make a change.'" Coombs said his client released only files she believed would cause no harm yet spark debate and prompt change, and that if Manning had not been selective, she would have leaked much more. Playing excerpts from the Baghdad helicopter attack ("Collateral Murder") video that Manning admitted supplying to WikiLeaks, Coombs told Judge Lind: "When the court looks at this, the defense requests that you not disengage, that you not look at this from the eyes of 'this happened on a battlefield.' Did they all deserve to die? That is what Private Manning is thinking as he is watching this video he is seeing, and he's questioning."

With closing arguments concluded, Col. Lind began her deliberations. Manning chose to have her court-martial heard by the judge only instead of a jury.

== Findings ==
On July 30, 2013, Judge Lind issued her findings regarding the charges. Manning was acquitted of aiding the enemy by knowingly giving out intelligence through indirect means, and was convicted of 19 of the 21 or 22 specified charges, including theft and six counts of espionage. The hearing on sentencing began on July 31, 2013. The maximum sentence that Manning could have faced was 136 years' imprisonment. This was subsequently reduced to 90 years after the military court granted the defense's motion to merge some of the 20 counts that Manning was being charged with on the grounds that they overlapped.

== Sentencing ==
The judge ruled in January 2013 that Manning's sentence would be reduced by 112 days because of treatment during confinement at Quantico. The sentencing phase of the trial began on July 31. A military psychologist who had treated Manning, Capt. Michael Worsley, testified that Manning had been left isolated in the army, trying to deal with gender-identity issues in a "hyper-masculine environment." On August 14 during the sentencing hearing, Manning apologized for past actions, telling the court: "I am sorry that my actions hurt people. I'm sorry that they hurt the United States. I am sorry for the unintended consequences of my actions. When I made these decisions I believed I was going to help people, not hurt people. ... At the time of my decisions I was dealing with a lot of issues." On August 21, 2013, Manning was sentenced to 35 years in prison. Manning was given credit of 1,293 days (3 years and 6 months) served in pre-trial confinement, and may be eligible for parole after serving one-third of the sentence. Manning was also reduced to the lowest enlisted pay grade (E-1), forfeited all pay and allowances, and given a dishonorable discharge.

== Petition for commutation of sentence ==
On September 3, 2013, Manning's attorney announced that he had filed on his client's behalf a Petition for Commutation of Sentence, submitted with a letter to the Secretary of the Army and, through the Department of Justice's Office of the Pardon Attorney, to President Obama, seeking a presidential pardon.

On January 17, 2017, President Obama commuted Manning's sentence to a total of seven years' confinement, starting with the initial date of arrest. As a result of the commutation Manning was released on May 17, 2017.

== Appeal ==
On May 31, 2018, the U.S. Army Court of Criminal Appeals upheld Manning's 2013 court-martial conviction of violating the Espionage Act. The court rejected Manning's contention that the statute is too vague to provide fair notice of the criminal nature of disclosing classified documents. "The facts of this case," the three-judge panel ruled, "leave no question as to what constituted national defense information. Appellant's training and experience indicate, without any doubt, she was on notice and understood the nature of the information she was disclosing and how its disclosure could negatively affect national defense." The court also rejected Manning's assertion that her actions in disclosing classified information related to national security are protected by the First Amendment. Manning, the court found, "had no First Amendment right to make the disclosures—doing so not only violated the nondisclosure agreements she signed, but also jeopardized national security."

== See also ==
Material alleged to have been leaked

- Afghan War documents leak
- Iraq War documents leak
- Guantanamo Bay files leak
- United States diplomatic cables leak
- Collateral Murder video
- Granai airstrike video

Miscellaneous

- List of material published by WikiLeaks
- Military Whistleblower Protection Act
- United States Court of Appeals for the Armed Forces
