= Article 32 hearing =

United States military court hearing

An Article 32 hearing is a proceeding under the United States Uniform Code of Military Justice, similar to that of a preliminary hearing in civilian law. Its name is derived from UCMJ section VII ("Trial Procedure") Article 32 (10 U.S.C. § 832), which mandates the hearing.

The UCMJ specifies several different levels of formality with which infractions can be dealt. The most serious is a general court-martial. An article 32 hearing is required before a defendant can be referred to a general court-martial, in order to determine whether there is enough evidence to merit a general court-martial. Offenders in the US military may face non-judicial punishment, a summary court-martial, special court-martial, general court-martial, or administrative separation. A commanding officer, in the role as court-martial convening authority, will consult with the command judge advocate for advice on case disposition; factors to be considered include, inter alia, the relevant statutory and case law, the seriousness of the offenses, the strength or weakness of each element of the case, the promotion of good order and discipline, and the commander's desire for case disposition.

An investigation is normally directed when it appears the charges are of such a serious nature that trial by general court-martial may be warranted. The commander directing an investigation under Article 32 details a commissioned officer as investigating officer who will conduct the investigation and make a report of conclusions and recommendations. This officer is never the accuser, trial counsel (judge advocate prosecutor), nor in the accused's chain of command. This officer may or may not have any legal training, although the use of military attorneys (judge advocates) is recommended and common within service practice. If the investigating officer is not a lawyer, he or she may seek legal advice from an impartial source, but may not obtain such advice from counsel for any party.

An investigative hearing is scheduled as soon as reasonably possible after the investigating officer's appointment. The hearing is normally attended by the investigating officer, the accused and the defense counsel. The commander will ordinarily detail counsel to represent the United States, and in some cases a court reporter and an interpreter; these appointments are, in practical reality, duty assignments made by the criminal law branch of the command judge advocate's office. Ordinarily, this investigative hearing is open to the public and the media.

The investigating officer will, generally, review all non-testimonial evidence and then proceed to examination of witnesses. Except for a limited set of rules on privileges, interrogation, and the rape-shield rule (MRE 412), the military rules of evidence do not apply at this investigative hearing. This does not mean, however, that the investigating officer ignores evidentiary issues. The investigating officer will comment on all evidentiary issues that are critical to a case's disposition. All testimony is taken under oath or affirmation, except that an accused may make an unsworn statement.

The defense is given wide latitude in cross-examining witnesses. As of 2013 in cases where sexual assault is alleged some critics allege an extremely intrusive and aggressive cross examination of the victim is permitted, a practice which has been cited by critics of the military's handling of sexual assault in the United States military. In one case, a midshipman at the Navy Academy was interrogated for 30 hours over several days about their past sexual behavior. If the commander details an attorney to represent the United States, this government representative will normally conduct a direct examination of the government witnesses. This is followed by cross-examination by the defense and examination by the investigating officer upon completion of questioning by both counsel. Likewise, if a defense witness is called, the defense counsel will normally conduct a direct examination followed by a government cross-examination. After redirect examination by the defense counsel, or completion of questioning by both counsel, the investigating officer may conduct additional examination. The exact procedures to be followed in the hearing are not specified in either the Uniform Code of Military Justice or the Manual for Court-Martial.

== See also ==
- Uniform Code of Military Justice
- Courts-martial in the United States
- Army Court of Criminal Appeals
- Navy-Marine Corps Court of Criminal Appeals
- Air Force Court of Criminal Appeals
- Coast Guard Court of Criminal Appeals
- United States Court of Appeals for the Armed Forces
