= Military discharge =

Release from military service

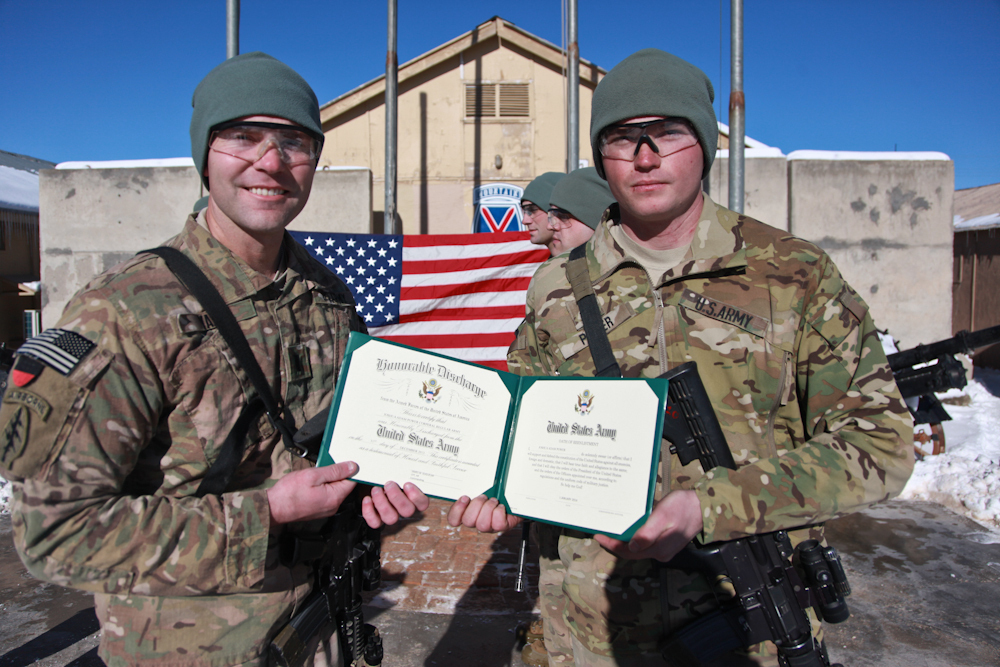
Two U.S. Army soldiers hold an honorable discharge certificate in 2014.

A military discharge is given when a member of the armed forces is released from their obligation to serve. Each country's military has different types of discharge. They are generally based on whether the persons completed their training and then fully and satisfactorily completed their term of service. Other types of discharge are based on factors such as the quality of their service, whether their service had to be ended prematurely due to humanitarian or medical reasons, whether they had been found to have drug or alcohol dependency issues and whether they were complying with treatment and counseling, and whether they had demerits or punishments for infractions or were convicted of any crimes. These factors affect whether they will be asked or allowed to re-enlist and whether they qualify for benefits after their discharge.

== United Kingdom ==
There are several reasons why someone may be discharged from the military, including expiration of enlistment, disability, dependency and hardship.

Members of the British Armed Forces are to complete their service obligations before they may be considered for discharge. Service personnel who attempt to leave before completing their length of service, without going through the appropriate channels, may be subject to a criminal conviction.

At the end of service in the Regular Forces, personnel normally have a compulsory reserve liability. The length of this liability depends on the Service, rank and type of commission or engagement in which they entered and whether they are subject to the Reserve Forces Act 1980 (c. 9) or Reserve Forces Act 1996.

=== British Army ===
Types of discharge

- Normal Service Leaver: personnel who A) are leaving on completion of engagement; B) have been given notice to leave, or C) been given notice of discharge under redundancy.
- Early Service Leaver: personnel who have been discharged either A) compulsorily from the trained or untrained strength, or B) at their own request from the trained strength or untrained strength having completed less than 4 years of service.
- Medical Discharge / Retirement: service is being terminated on medical grounds. Personnel would have attended a Medical Board that recommended the person's services be terminated on medical grounds.

Army officers and other ranks must be interviewed by at least one of the following:

- Unit welfare officer
- Regimental career management officer
- Regimental sergeant major (RSM)
- Regimental administrative officer
- Commanding officer (CO)
- Unit resettlement information staff

=== Naval service ===
Individuals in the Royal Navy and Royal Marines who are not due for compulsory retirement but who wish to leave the service, for whatever reason, before reaching the end of their commission/career/engagement may apply for early termination, provided the conditions outlined in Chapter 54 of BR 3 - Naval Personnel Management are met. Within the Naval Service, the term "retirement" applies to officers who complete the period of service required by their respective commissions. For officers of the trained strength, recommendations for termination of a commission must generally be reviewed by the Admiralty Board.

- Early termination: officers may apply to leave (voluntarily withdraw from training) up to their Premature Termination of Career Training (PTCT) point, which is generally before the day they pass out of Britannia Royal Naval College, and also depends on their specialty. Ratings and Other Ranks have a "statutory right of discharge" after six months' service or after they turn 18.
- Invaliding: Personnel may be "invalided out" if they are found "permanently unfit for full naval service" by the Naval Service Medical Board of Survey (NSMBOS).

- Resignation: This is a common civilian term used to refer to the termination of one's commission but in the Naval Service, the term "resignation" has a "special meaning". Despite common usage of the term, officers do not legally have the right to resign their commission. However, they may be permitted to do so under extenuating circumstances, at the discretion of their CO and with permission from the Admiralty Board. Resignation is appropriate when an officer wishes to sever all connection with the Service. Circumstances that would warrant resignation rather than the other types of discharge are where an individual holds actions or beliefs/attitudes that fundamentally conflict with the concept of military service. The primary consideration of the Admiralty Board's acceptance of resignation is the best interests of the Service. Officers who resign their commissions are not liable to serve in the Reserves but certain benefits such as retired pay and resettlement grant may be affected.

Other types of discharges include:

- Compulsory Withdrawal from Training (CWFT): When an officer's performance – whether professional, character or leadership – falls below the standard required, even after all appropriate warnings have been applied, this type of discharge may be invoked. Young Officers (YO) (officers in training) at the Britannia Royal Naval College or Commando Training Centre Royal Marines and Officer Candidates promoted from the Lower Deck who fail to complete initial training can also be subjected to a CWFT. Pilots undergoing professional training would be suspended from flying duties.
- Administrative Discharge: Officers whose performance or conduct falls below the standard required may be discharged from the Active List.
  - Incapacity Due to Causes beyond the Officer's Control
  - Unsuitability Due to Causes within the Officer's Control: service personnel (both officers and ratings) may be discharged on grounds of "temperamental unsuitability" (TU). The RN BR3 handbook defines TU as "a persistent and obvious failure by the individual to adapt to the basic, but unique demands of Service life".
  - Misconduct
- Dismissal: Officers charged with offences under the Military Discipline Legislation. In exceptional cases, officers may be "dismissed with disgrace".
- Compassionate discharge: There are several types of compassionate discharges. Such a discharge is granted for Ratings who seek a discharge due to extenuating personal circumstances.

=== Standing for election ===
The House of Commons Disqualification Acts prevent members of the regular forces from serving as MPs in the UK House of Commons. Until 1963, a service member standing for election was automatically granted an honourable discharge during peacetime (in wartime only leave of absence unless successfully elected). The custom originally applied only to officers, since only members of the nobility or gentry met the property qualification for election. In June 1962, an enlisted man, who had been refused a discharge to enrol at university, stood in the Middlesbrough West by-election, securing his discharge for the price of his electoral deposit. That November, eight more servicemen availed of the same loophole at by-elections in Chippenham, South Dorset, Central Norfolk, and South Northamptonshire. Amid public controversy over these cases it emerged that merely applying for nomination papers would secure a discharge, with no need to submit the papers, pay the deposit, or appear on the ballot paper. In March 1963, there were 174 such applications for the Colne Valley by-election and 493 for the Rotherham by-election. Military regulations were then changed so that, before an applicant is granted a discharge, a screening committee appointed by the Home Secretary, comprising two King's Counsel and six former MPs, must agree they are a bona fide political aspirant with some chance of success.

== United States ==
Most often, when someone leaves the U.S. military, they are separated, not discharged. Enlisting in the U.S. military generally entails an eight-year commitment, served with a combination of active and reserve service. Individuals who voluntarily separate from active duty with fewer than eight years normally fulfill the balance of their term in the Individual Ready Reserve (IRR). In the U.S., discharge or separation is not military retirement; personnel who serve for 20 years or longer are retired, and are transferred to the Retired Reserve. Members who are seriously disabled are also retired (receiving what is referred to as a Medical Retirement) rather than discharged.

Typical reasons for discharge (with or without an administrative board hearing):

- Expiration of Term of Service (ETS)
- Failure to meet physical fitness standards
- Reaching the maximum age limit
- High Year Tenure (reaching the maximum allowable time in grade, and not selected for promotion)
- Disability, dependency, or hardship
- Pregnancy/parenthood
- Personality disorder
- Medical conditions not considered disabilities
- Physical or mental conditions that interfere with military service, resulting in placement on the Temporary or Permanent Disability Retirement Lists
- Convenience of the Government/Secretarial Authority (voluntary redundancy due to funding cutbacks, for example)
- Unsuitability for military service
- Misconduct – Minor disciplinary infractions
- Misconduct – Drug use, possession, or distribution
- Misconduct – Commission of a serious offense
- Entry-level performance and conduct
- Resignation (available to officers only)
- Reduction in Force (RIF)
- Entry Level Separation (ELS). Uncharacterized (neither Good nor Bad Conduct) if discharged within the first 180 days of service and no misconduct is found in the service member's record
- Punitive Discharges
  - Bad Conduct Discharge (BCD) issued by either Special Court Martial or General Court Martial only.
  - Dishonorable Discharge issued by a General Court Martial only

If discharged administratively for any of the above reasons, the service member normally receives an Honorable discharge, a General (Under Honorable Conditions) discharge, or an Under Other Than Honorable Conditions (UOTHC) discharge service characterization.

To receive an honorable discharge, a service member must have received a rating from good to excellent for their service. Service members who meet or exceed the required standards of duty performance and personal conduct, and who complete their tours of duty, normally receive honorable discharges. A dishonorable discharge (DD) is a punitive discharge that can only be handed down at a general court-martial after conviction(s) of serious offenses (e.g., felony-like crimes such as desertion before an enemy, drug distribution, sexual assault, murder, etc.) by a military judge or panel (jury).

Career U.S. military members who retire are not separated or discharged. Upon retirement, officers and enlisted personnel are transferred to the Retired Reserve. For active duty personnel, until they reach a cumulative 30 years of service, active plus retired reserve combined, they are subject to recall to active duty by order of the President. In addition, a military member who becomes disabled due to an injury or illness is medically retired if: 1) The member is determined to be unfit "… to perform duties of the member's office, grade, rank or rating ..."; 2) Whose disability is determined to be permanent and stable; 3) Is either rated at a minimum of 30% disabled, or the member has 20 years of military service. Medical retirees are transferred to the Retired Reserve with the same retired pay and benefits as 20+ year retirees. Medically retired personnel are not subject to recall to active duty.

=== Administrative discharges ===
==== Entry level separation (ELS) or Uncharacterized discharge ====
Entry level separations, which are accompanied by an uncharacterized discharge, are given to individuals who separate prior to completing 180 days of military service or when discharge action was initiated prior to 180 days of service. The vast majority of these administrative separations occur during recruit training or "boot camp". This type of discharge (over 19,000 in 2019) does not attempt to characterize service as good or bad. Rather, an uncharacterized discharge is the absence of a characterization of service, as the individual being discharged does not have sufficient time in service in order to fairly characterize the individual's service. However, this type of discharge often attaches a reason such as pregnancy, performance in training, or medical issues. An individual with an ELS may, under certain conditions, be allowed to re-enlist in the military.

During the drafting of the 2021 National Defense Authorization Act, the House of Representatives passed Congresswoman Elaine Luria's amendment to accompany H.R. 6395 that required the United States Armed Forces to report on the number of service members subject to the misuse of the uncharacterized discharge since 2001. However, the amendment was removed by the Senate.

==== Honorable discharge ====
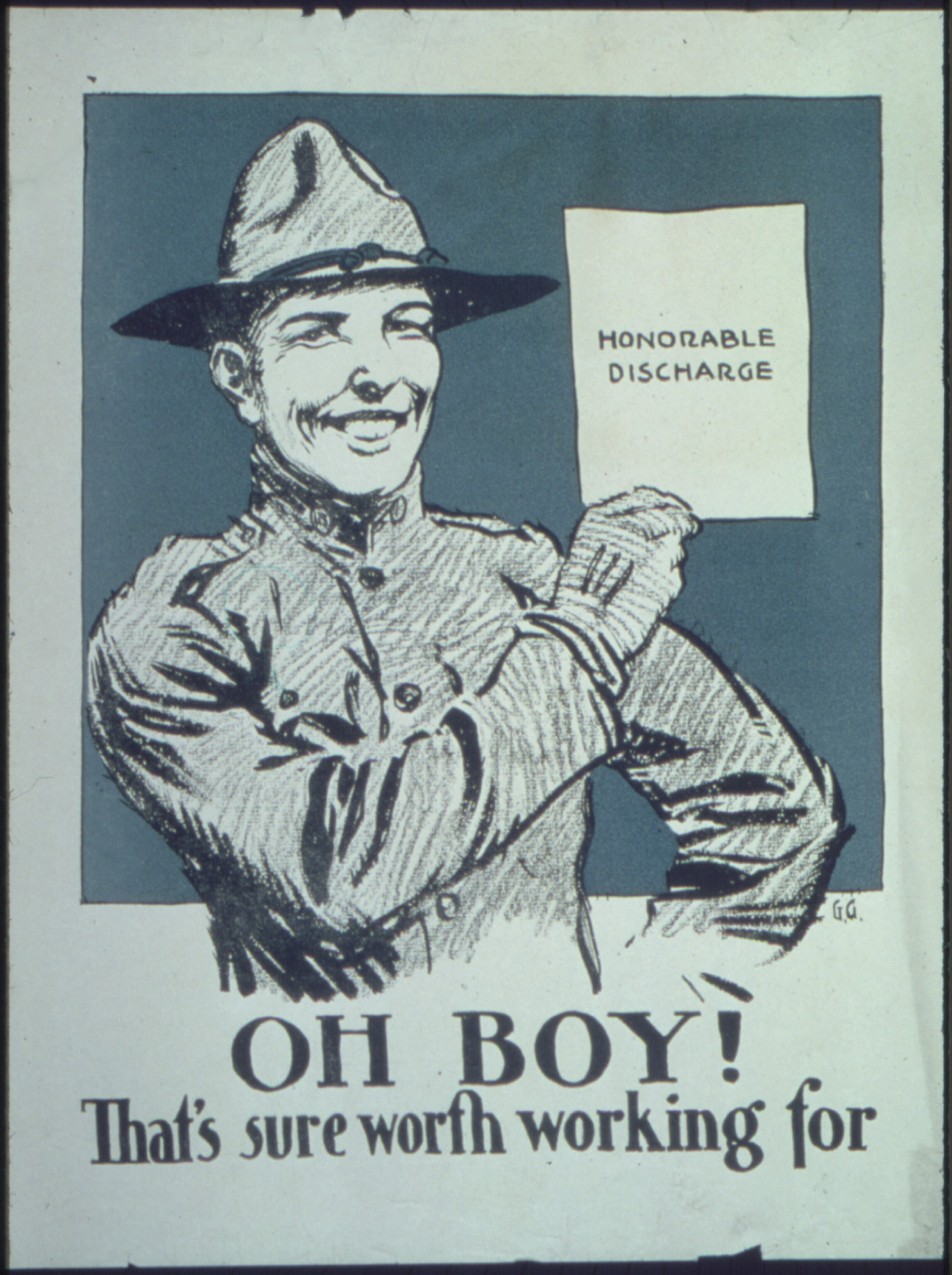
World War I poster depicting a soldier holding his honorable discharge

To receive an honorable discharge, service members must have received a rating from good to excellent for their service. Service members who meet or exceed most of the required standards of duty performance, committed no or minimal misconduct, and who complete their tours of duty, normally receive honorable discharges. Over 80% of U.S. service members separate with an honorable discharge.

However, it is not necessary to complete a full term of service to receive an honorable discharge, as long as the discharge is not due to misconduct. For instance, service members rendered physically or psychologically incapable of performing assigned duties normally have their service characterized as honorable, regardless of whether they incurred the condition or disability in the line of duty, provided they otherwise met or exceeded standards. Similarly, service members selected for involuntary discharge due to a Reduction in Force (RIF) typically receive an honorable discharge, assuming their conduct while on active duty met or exceeded standards. Individuals with honorable discharges will also, under certain circumstances, be allowed to re-enlist in the US military.

According to AR 635-200, paragraph 9–4, "The service of Soldiers discharged under this section will be characterized as honorable or under honorable conditions unless the Soldier is in entry-level status and an uncharacterized description of service is required. An honorable discharge is mandated in any case in which the Government initially introduces into the final discharge process limited use evidence as defined by AR 600–85, paragraph 6–4. (See para 2–6h for procedures for reinitiation or rehearing, if appropriate.)"

==== General discharge ====
General discharges—more formally referred to as a "General (Under Honorable Conditions)"—are given to service members who engaged in minor to moderate misconduct, or performed satisfactorily but failed to meet performance standards expected of military members. Reasons for such a characterization of service vary, and are used by the unit commander as a means to correct unacceptable behavior prior to initiating discharge action (unless the reason is drug abuse, in which case discharge is often mandatory). A commander must disclose the reasons for the discharge action in writing to the service member, and must explain reasons for recommending the service be characterized as General. The service member is normally required to sign a statement acknowledging receipt and understanding of the notification of pending discharge memorandum. In the case of drug-related offenses, the person is also advised of the right to seek counsel and present supporting statements.

In addition, service members are required to sign documents acknowledging that "substantial prejudice in civilian life" may be encountered under a general discharge. Members who receive a general discharge jeopardize a number of VA benefits or entitlements such as eligibility to participate in the GI Bill, service on veterans' commissions, and other programs for which an honorable discharge is required. They may lose eligibility to re-enlist, but they will remain eligible for most or all of the "standard" VA benefits, such as disability and health care.

Federal and state laws, such as Illinois through the Illinois Human Rights Act, prohibit discrimination against a veteran from housing or employment on the basis of unfavorable discharge from military service, as long as a veteran does not receive a dishonorable discharge.

==== Under Other Than Honorable Conditions (UOTHC) Discharge ====
A UOTHC (often further abbreviated and referred to as a "UO" or "OTH") discharge represents a significant departure from the conduct and performance expected of all military members, and is issued for more serious or repeated misconduct, such as assaults, security violations, excessive trouble with authorities, and illegal possession, use, or sale of drugs.

Generally, in order to receive VA benefits and services, the veteran's character of discharge or service must be characterized as better than a UOTHC or not be punitive (BCD or DD). However, individuals receiving an UO, BCD, or DD will have their service reviewed by the VA. In some cases, certain statutory and regulatory bars may not apply, and a servicemember may still be allowed access to VA benefits and services. The VA adjudication of a person's service characterization, including examination of these bars, is called a "Character of Discharge" (COD) review (sometimes referred to as a "Character of Service Determination (CSD)"), as defined by 38 USC 5305B.

Veterans with an UOTHC discharge and considered "Honorable for VA purposes" may still apply for the full enrollment in the VA. Assuming most or all other eligibility criteria are met, they will receive medical benefits, disability benefits, vocational programs, and other wrap-around services. Once the VA has deemed an UOTHC discharge "Honorable for VA Purposes" it is similar to having a general discharge in terms of benefits and services.

"Honorable for VA Purposes" is not the same as an Honorable discharge or General discharge, and does not necessarily upgrade one's discharge to Honorable or General, and therefore does not necessarily qualify one for education benefits. However, even if someone has an UOTHC discharge, they may still qualify, such as through other periods of service that qualify them as "Honorable for VA Purposes", for education benefits.

Veterans with Other Than Honorable discharges who are deemed "Dishonorable for VA Purposes" because of a regulatory bar may still qualify for health care, but only for service-related condition or injuries. If the veteran is barred for statutory reasons, even this limited health care is not available.

Additionally, most veterans with an UOTHC discharge cannot re-enlist or use the GI Bill.

==== Clemency discharge ====
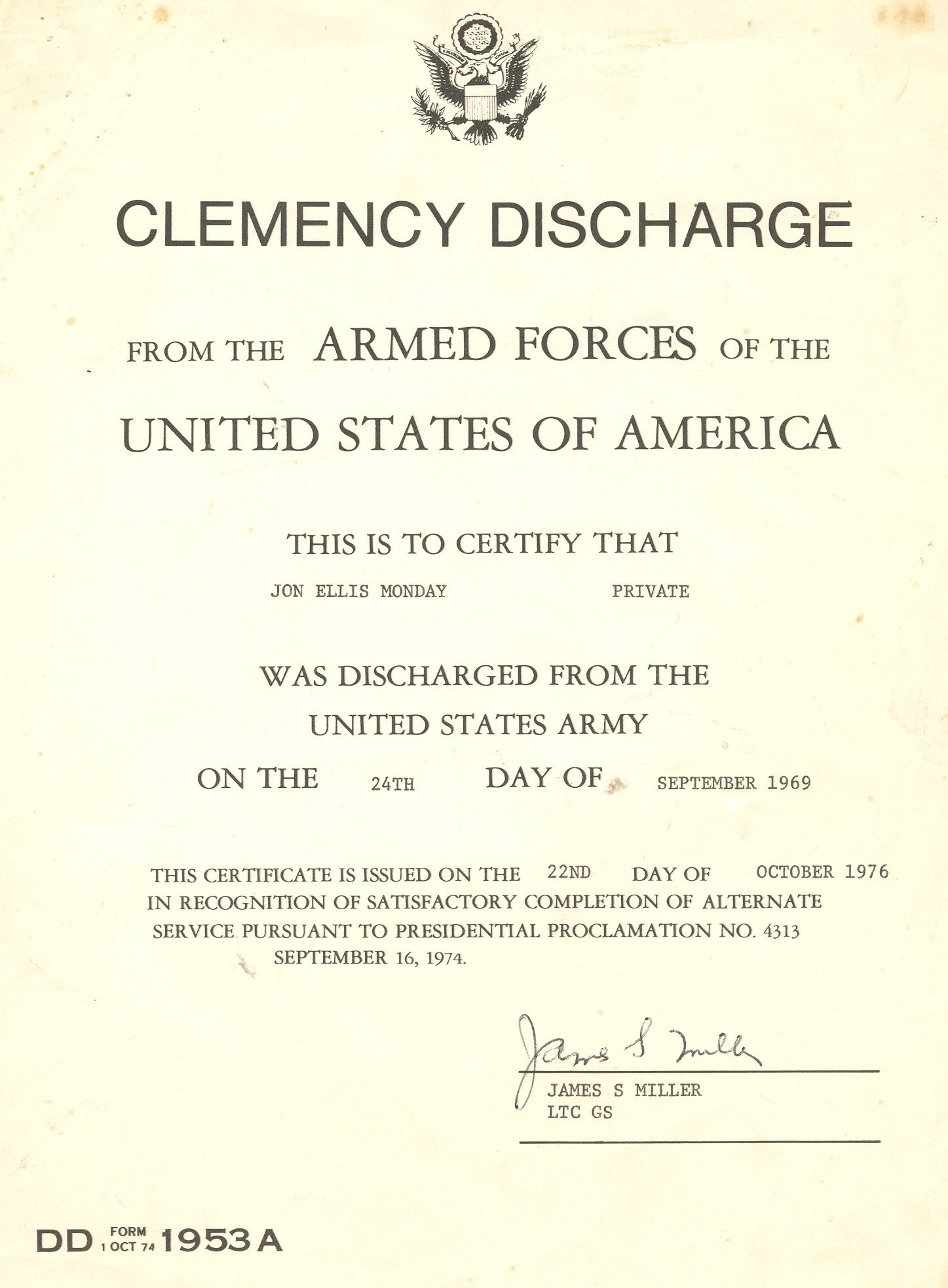
Clemency Discharge established by Presidential Proclamation 4313

By Presidential Proclamation 4313, President Gerald Ford created a procedure for those military personnel who resisted the Vietnam War to receive a presidential pardon and have their punitive discharges changed to a clemency discharge. It also provided a path for those who left the country to return. If the military personnel fulfilled certain requirements of alternative service, they would also receive a Certificate of Completion from the Selective Service System.

=== Punitive discharges ===
Punitive discharges are imposed for conduct prejudicial to good order and discipline.

==== Bad Conduct Discharge (BCD) ====
A Bad Conduct Discharge, colloquially referred to as a "big chicken dinner" or "big crazy duck", from the initialism, can only be given by a court-martial (either special or general) as a punishment for an enlisted service member. Bad conduct discharges may be preceded by a period of confinement in a military prison. The discharge itself is not issued until completion of the appellate review process, or in the cases of discharges involving a prison sentence, completion of both the sentence and the appellate review process.

Many or all veterans' benefits are forfeited in the case of a Bad Conduct Discharge, and those discharged through a general court-martial will also not be eligible for disability compensation. Even then, although these veterans can still receive health care, they might not necessarily be able to do so through the VA.

==== Dishonorable discharge (DD) ====
A dishonorable discharge, colloquially referred to as a "duck dinner", is the most serious type of discharge in the US military. It can only be handed down to a military member by a general court-martial: dishonorable discharges are rendered by conviction from a general court-martial for exceptionally serious offenses (e.g., treason, espionage, desertion, sexual assault, or murder).

With a dishonorable discharge, all or almost all benefits are forfeited, regardless of any past honorable service, and this type of discharge is regarded as shameful in the military. As with many bad conduct discharges, dishonorable discharges are normally preceded by military prison sentences and are formally issued after completion of both confinement and the appellate review process. In the rare event that a court-martial imposes a death sentence, the dishonorable discharge will be given out on the day prior to the condemned soldier being put to death.

In most states, a dishonorable discharge is deemed the equivalent of a felony conviction, with the concomitant loss of many civil rights. Veterans who have been dishonorably discharged lose the ability to own firearms, work government jobs and receive government assistance and loans, and in some jurisdictions also to vote, hold public office, or serve in a jury. Additionally, since government aid is normally not available and bank loans are very difficult to obtain for those with dishonorable discharges, veterans who are dishonorably discharged often find attending post-secondary education difficult, and many have a difficult time finding work once they return to civilian life.

U.S. federal law also prohibits possession of ammunition, firearms, or explosives by those who have been dishonorably discharged. Per the Gun Control Act of 1968, being dishonorably discharged is also a disqualifying question on ATF Form 4473, which must be completed and signed to purchase a firearm from a Federal Firearms Licensee, and in most cases will result in a denial by the Brady background check that must be performed and passed to allow a sale.

=== Statistics ===
According to the Department of Defense, of 207,000 service members that were discharged in 2014, more than 18,000 (9%) were issued less-than-honorable paperwork, with 4143 veterans (2.0%) receiving other-than-honorable discharges, 637 (0.31%) receiving bad conduct discharges, and 157 (0.08%) receiving dishonorable discharges. Between 2000 and 2014, 352,000 people in all were handed similar papers, ranging from general to dishonorable.

=== Analogous proceedings for commissioned officers ===
Commissioned officers cannot be reduced in rank by a court-martial, nor can they be given a bad conduct discharge or a dishonorable discharge. If an officer is convicted by a general court-martial, then that officer's sentence can include a "dismissal", a separation carrying the same consequences as a dishonorable discharge for an enlisted person and a reduction in rank to the last rank at which the officer served satisfactorily. A US Treasury decision states that even though an officer is dismissed rather than dishonorably discharged, the phrase "discharged from the Armed Forces under dishonorable conditions" is broad enough to include a dismissal rendered for an officer by a general court-martial, and thus an officer dismissed under dishonorable conditions is also prohibited from possessing firearms or ammunition under federal law, in the same manner as someone with a dishonorable discharge.

If a court-martial convicts an officer but imposes a sentence that does not include a dismissal, the secretary of the officer's service branch may drop that officer from the roll (official list) of officers in that branch. Such a separation is characterized as administrative rather than punitive.

=== Appeal procedures ===
After discharge, a service member (or their next of kin, if the service member is deceased) can appeal the type of discharge that was given.

The member must file form DD-293 if discharged within 15 years, or form DD-149 if over 15 years ago. The forms are significantly different and go to the Discharge Review Board (DRB) and the Board for correction of military records (BCMR) respectively. 10 U.S.C. §§ 1552–1553 provide the law for this action.

The service member (or their next of kin if the service member is deceased) must submit evidence for error, impropriety or inequity in discharge. Most appeals are rejected, however, and changes are authorized only if it can be proven the service member was unfairly denied an honorable characterization.

==== Appellate review of punitive discharges ====
Any punitive discharge adjudged by a court-martial is automatically reviewed by a military appellate court for each respective branch. These are the Army Court of Criminal Appeals (ACCA), Air Force Court of Criminal Appeals (AFCCA), Navy-Marine Corps Court of Criminal Appeals (NMCCCA), and the Coast Guard Court of Criminal Appeals (CGCCA). These courts are staffed by appellate military judges and function as an intermediate appellate court and have the power to review de novo both any questions of legal error and the factual basis of the conviction. If either the government or the accused is dissatisfied with the results of this appeal, the conviction or the sentence can be appealed to the Court of Appeals for the Armed Forces (CAAF). This court has the power of discretionary review, in that it can in some cases deny a petition to grant a review. This court however must hear any death penalty cases or cases certified by the Judge Advocate General of each respective service for appellate review. Litigants before the CAAF can appeal to the United States Supreme Court. However, this right only applies to any case that the CAAF has reviewed. Therefore, in most military justice cases, the CAAF is the court of last resort since a denial of a petition of review by that court prevents higher appeal.

Servicemembers who are given a punitive discharge and have completed any adjudged confinement are normally placed on appellate leave pending final review of their cases by the appellate courts. This includes members who plead guilty at their courts-martial since all cases are automatically reviewed. The member is considered on active duty and is subject to the Uniform Code of Military Justice while on appellate leave. While the member is entitled to full health care benefits and other privileges of being on active duty, the member receives no pay or allowances and is relieved of any military duties.

A service member who was adjudged a punitive discharge at a court martial and then dies before the appellate review process is complete is considered to have died on active duty under honorable conditions. Their next-of-kin is then entitled to any rights and benefits to which any other service member's family would be entitled.

==== Upgrade of administrative discharges and special court-martial BCDs ====
Once discharge is finalized, General, Entry-Level/Uncharacterized, and Under Other-Than-Honorable Conditions (UOTHC or OTH) discharges may be appealed for upgrade through the Discharge Review Board of the respective service; however, the appeal must be filed within 15 years of the date of separation, and it must be shown that the characterization of service was the result of an error or injustice. Bad Conduct Discharges handed down by a Special Court-Martial may be upgraded only as an act of clemency. Discharge Review Boards may also consider appeals for a change to the Narrative Reason for Discharge (in Block 28 of DD 214). The DRB does not consider a request for the change of a Reenlistment Eligibility (RE) or Separation Designator (SPD) Code by itself, but they are often changed to correspond with the new characterization of service and/or narrative reason for discharge if a discharge is upgraded.

If more than 15 years have passed since discharge, appeals must be directed to the Board for Correction of Military/Naval Records of the respective service. The BCM/NR hears a wide array of appeals and correction requests, and can be used by Active Duty, Reserve, National Guard, retired and discharged veterans alike. Normally, an appeal must be filed within three years of the occurrence of an error or injustice; however, exceptions are often made.

In the United States, every service member who is discharged or released from active duty is issued a DD Form 214 and a military discharge certificate (denoting the discharge type). A reservist who is called to active duty is given a DD 214 when he or she is deactivated and returned to the reserves. Those who are discharged before completing 8 years of active duty or reserve duty in an active drilling status are transferred to the Individual Ready Reserve (IRR) for the remainder of their military service obligations (MSO). The Individual Ready Reserve does not drill or receive pay; however, a member in IRR status can be recalled to active duty during time of war or national emergency until the 8 years have expired. Most members separating with an honorable discharge after completing a single term of service (typically 3–6 years) are transferred to the IRR for the remainder of the 8-year MSO. Retirees are furnished with the DD 214, though a U.S. military retirement is not characterized as a discharge as retirees may be recalled to active duty, under certain circumstances, until they have achieved a total of 30 years of service.

The DD 214 is a summary of military service. It contains total time in service, dates of entry and discharge, dates of rank, documentation of foreign service, ribbons, medals and badges awarded, professional military education completed, characterization of service, and reason for discharge. In responses to job applications, many employers request a copy of the DD 214. There are two DD 214 types: the deleted (or "short") version, and the undeleted (or "long") version. The deleted version omits certain information, including the reason for discharge.

Employers often request the unedited version, but the legality of this is debatable in certain situations. It can be denied, especially if the "long" version references facts that violate the right to privacy or could be used in a discriminatory fashion (such as non-relevant psychological, medical, or disability issues) explicitly cited as illegal by federal or state hiring laws. For example, the Illinois Human Rights Act prohibits discrimination due to unfavorable discharge. A service member may request the edited, unedited, or both versions on separation.

Since the 1970s, an honorably discharged veteran receives a frameable certificate (DD 256). A similar one is issued to someone granted a general discharge (DD 257). For each certificate, one or more letters after the number indicate the branch of service that issued it. For example, a "256A" is awarded by the Army. Other certificates for long service, or to eligible spouses of veterans, may also be presented.

The Freedom of Information Act has made (limited) records of military service available to the public, on request. However, information protected by the Privacy Act of 1974 can be released only with the veteran's consent. Records are stored at the U.S. National Archives.

==== Military discharge uniform insignia ====
During wartime, the American military have often issued special insignia to honorably discharged veterans to wear on their uniforms in order to distinguish them from local service personnel or deserters.

The Army issued red Discharge Chevrons during and after World War I (1917–1919) that were worn point-up on the lower right sleeve of the tunic or overcoat. Just before and just after World War II (September 1939 – December 1946) the Army issued the Honorable Discharge Insignia (or "Ruptured Duck"). It was an eagle in a circle badge sewn in yellow thread on an olive drab diamond that was worn over the right breast pocket on the "Class A" dress tunic.

Since 1916 the Marine Corps has issued an Honorable Discharge Lapel Button that is meant to be worn with civilian clothes. During World War II, from 1941 to 1945, a contrasting diamond was worn on the lower right sleeve with the Dress Blues or Dress Whites (a white diamond on the Dress Blues and a blue diamond on the Dress Whites) by retired Marines. A white diamond was worn on the upper right shoulder (like a Distinctive Unit Insignia) on the Service Green or Service Khaki "Alphas" and the overcoat by discharged Marines.

=== Reenlistment Eligibility Code ===
Another important aspect is the RE (Reenlistment Eligibility) Code. This specifies under what conditions the member can reenlist in the armed forces. The definition of each RE Code may vary from Service to Service, as currently it is the responsibility of each branch of the Armed Forces to establish reenlistment eligibility criteria. As a general rule, however, an RE Code in the "1" series allows reenlistment into any component of the Armed Forces, and an RE Code in the "3" series usually lets the veteran reenlist with a waiver. RE Codes in the "2" series often place restrictions on reenlistment: this is especially true in the Air Force, which has a policy permanently barring airmen separated from the Air Force with an RE Code 2 from reenlisting in the Air Force (though reenlistment into other components of the Armed Forces may be possible with a waiver). An RE Code in the "4" series typically bars reenlistment into any component of the Armed Forces. (It is possible for a person with an RE Code of 4 to enlist in the Navy or Air Force if the SPD Code and the Narrative Reasoning is waivable.) A veteran issued an RE Code in the "4" series usually requires an Exception to Policy waiver to reenlist.

The Department of Veterans Affairs uses different criteria from the Departments of the Air Force, Army, and Navy when establishing veteran status. VA benefits, such as the VA's health care and home loan programs, can sometimes be enjoyed if the veteran's conduct was not dishonorable.

== Gallery of international discharge documents ==
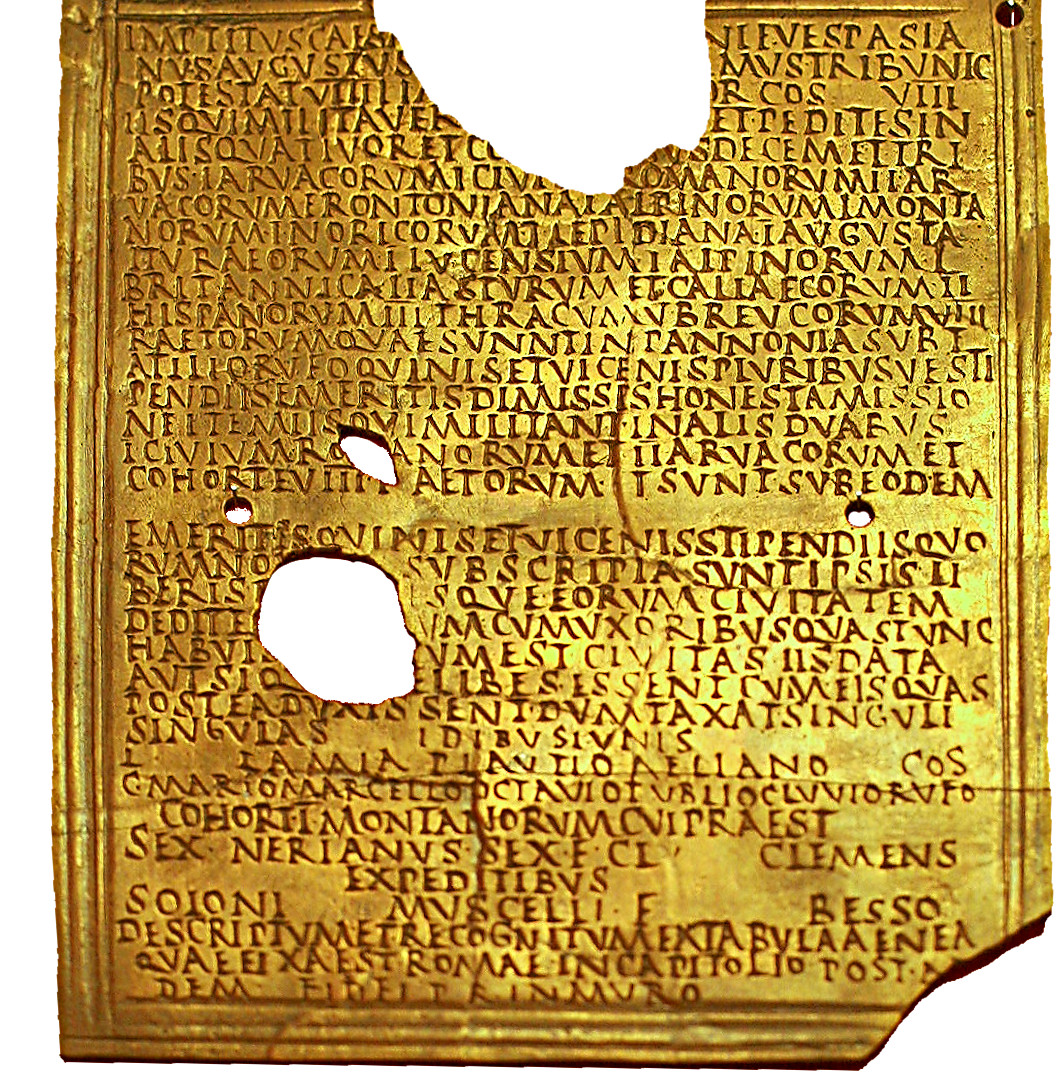
Roman military diploma (honesta missio), granting discharge and citizenship rights to a veteran of the Roman army.

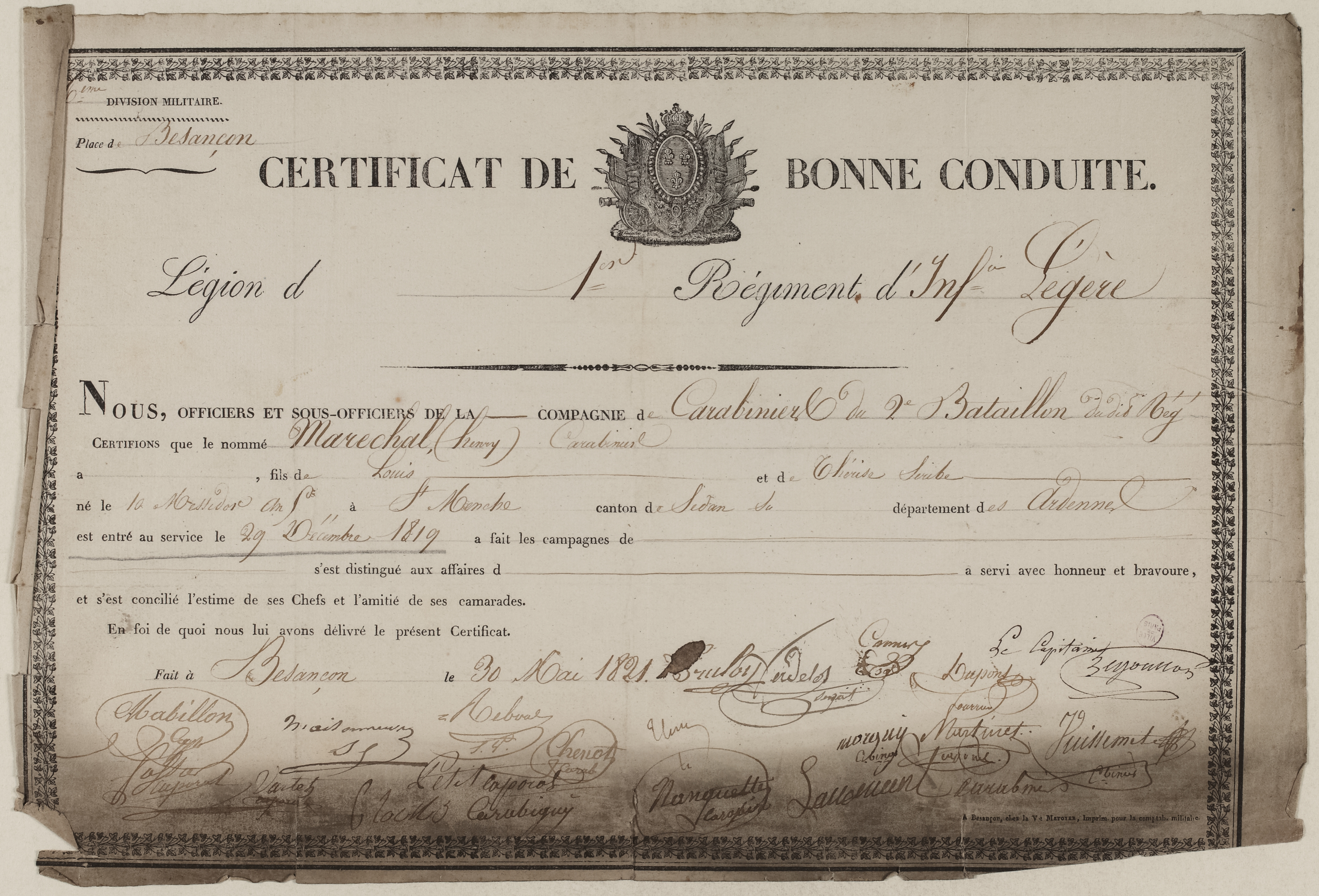
French-language Certificat de bonne conduite, Kingdom of France, 1821.

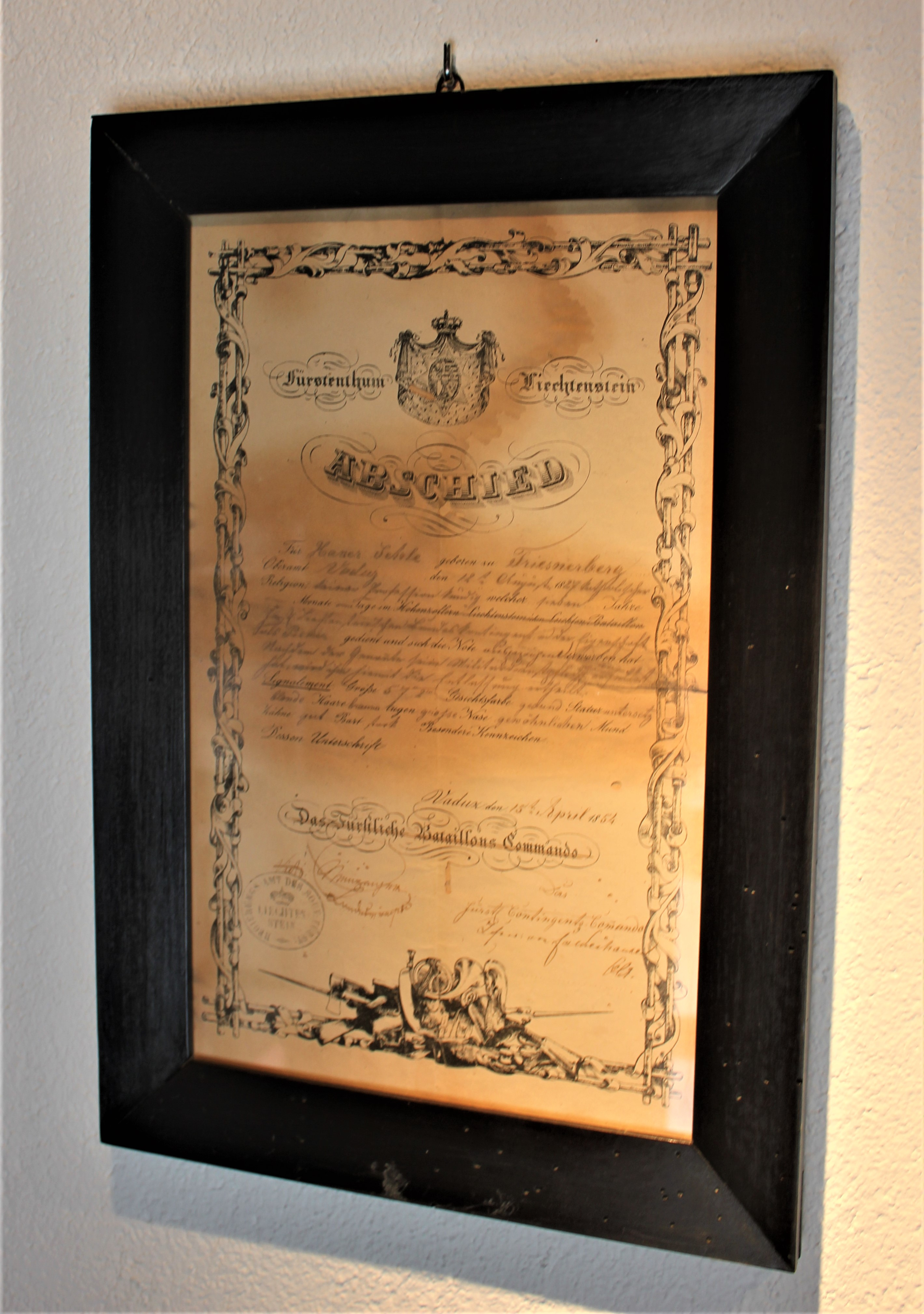
German-language military discharge certificate (Militär-Abschiedsurkunde) from the Principality of Liechtenstein, 1854.

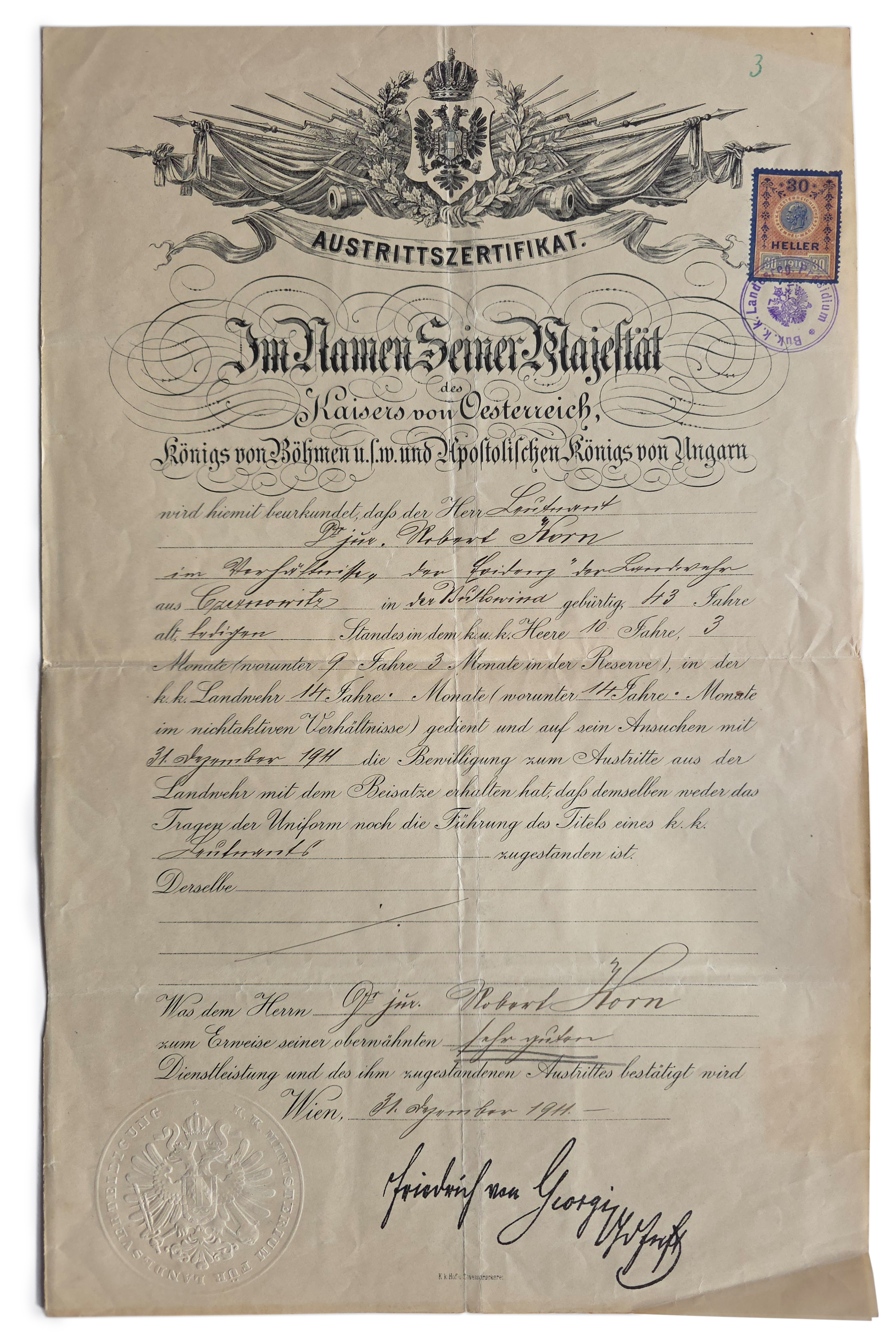
Austro-Hungarian discharge certificate (Austrittszertifikat) issued to a reserve lieutenant of the Imperial-Royal Landwehr, 1911.

== See also ==
- Blue discharge
- Discharge by purchase
- GI Rights Network
- Section 8 (military)
