= Wendy Kelly =

American lawyer and officer in the United States Army Reserves

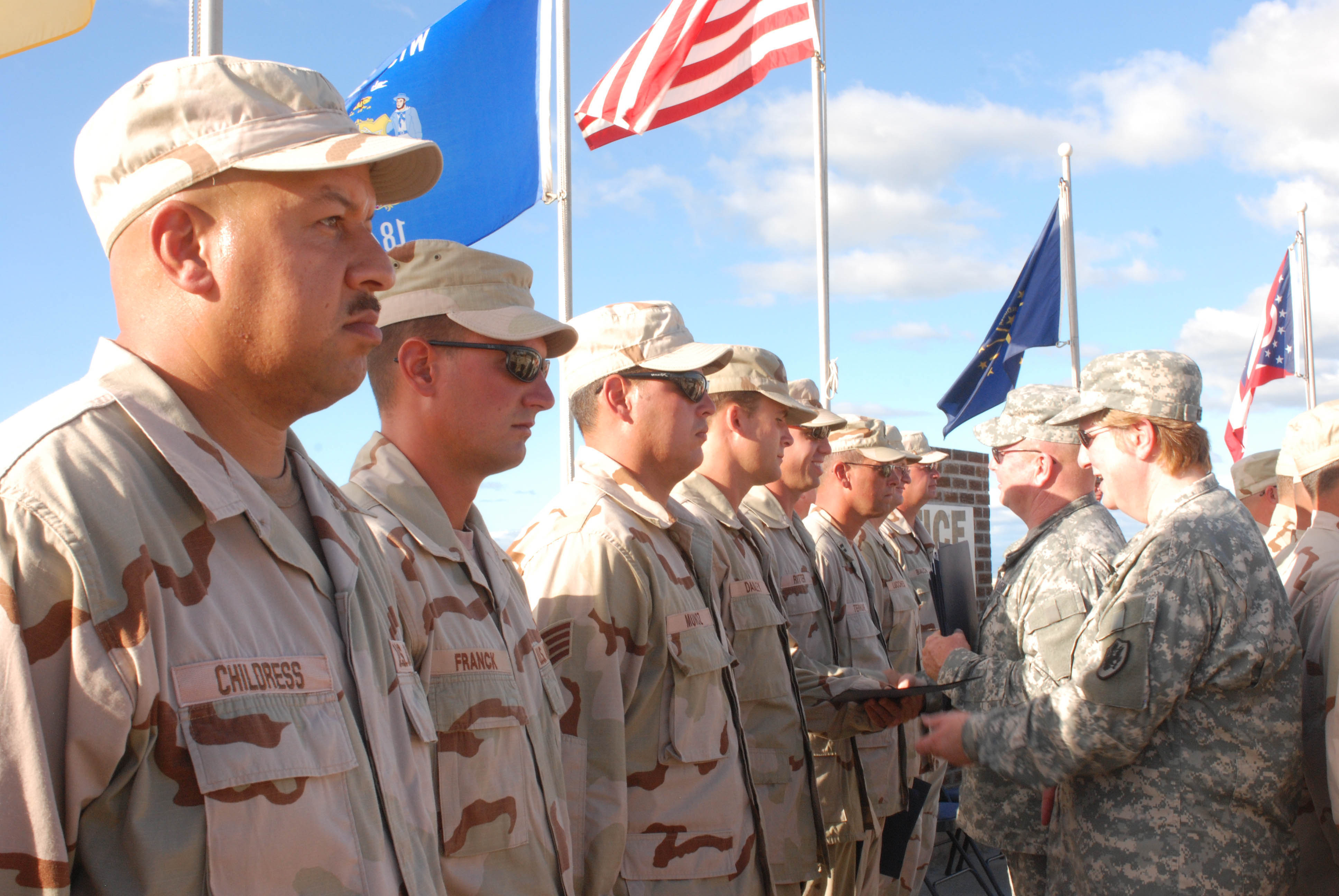
- Wendy Kelly inspects troops in Guantanamo on 2008-02-02.
- Military career
- Branch: United States Army Reserve
- Rank: Colonel

Wendy Kelly is an American lawyer and officer in the United States Army Reserves. In 2004, Kelly was an Assistant United States Attorney. In 2005, Kelly was appointed the director of operations of the Office of Military Commissions

In 2008, an email from Kelly was submitted at hearings of several military commissions in an attempt to show that the Guantanamo military commissions Convening Authority had been involved in composing the charges against Khadr and five other Guantanamo captives.
