= Navy-Marine Corps Court of Criminal Appeals =

United States Article I court

United States Navy-Marine Corps Court of Criminal Appeals
- (N.M.C.C.A.)
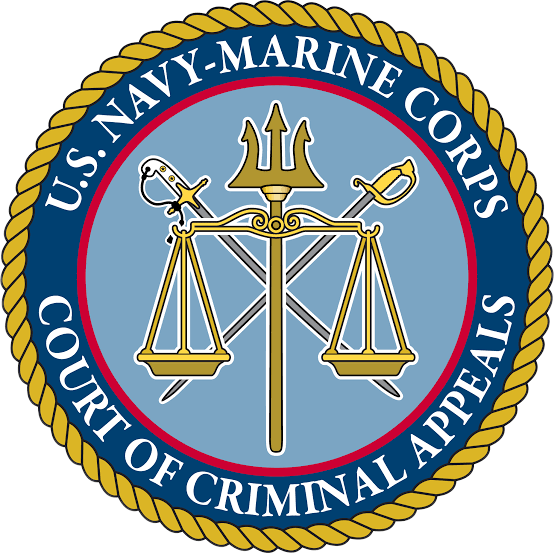
- Location: Washington Navy Yard (Washington, D.C.)
- Appeals to: Court of Appeals for the Armed Forces
- Established: 1968
- Authority: Article I tribunal
- Created by: Uniform Code of Military Justice
- Official website

The Navy-Marine Corps Court of Criminal Appeals (NMCCA) is the intermediate appellate court for criminal convictions in the United States Navy and the Marine Corps.

Courts-martial are conducted under the Uniform Code of Military Justice (Title 10 of the United States Code §§ 801-946), and the Manual for Courts-Martial. If the trial results in a conviction, the case is reviewed by the convening authority (the person who referred the case for trial by court-martial). The convening authority has discretion to mitigate the findings and sentence.

== Review court ==
If the sentence, as approved by the convening authority, includes death, a bad conduct or dishonorable discharge, dismissal of an officer, or confinement for one year or more, the case is reviewed by an intermediate court. For the Navy and Marine Corps, this is the Navy-Marine Corps Court of Criminal Appeals.

== Description ==
The Navy-Marine Corps Court of Criminal Appeals (NMCCA) is located in Washington, D.C. in the Navy Yard. The court conducts mandatory review (unless waived by the appellant) of all courts-martial of members of the naval service referred to the court pursuant to Articles 62, 66, 69, and 73 of the Uniform Code of Military Justice. When necessary in furtherance of its jurisdiction, the Court reviews all petitions for extraordinary relief properly filed before it (28 U.S.C. § 1651). The United States military justice system commonly uses four writs: mandamus, prohibition, error coram nobis, and habeas corpus. A writ of mandamus is an order from a court of competent jurisdiction that requires the performance of a specified act by an inferior court or authority. The writ of prohibition is used to prevent the commission of a specified act or issuance of a particular order. The writ of error, coram nobis, is used to bring an issue before the court that previously decided the same issue. It allows the court to review error of fact or a retroactive change in the law that which affects the validity of the prior proceeding. The writ of habeas corpus is used to challenge either the legal basis for or the manner of confinement.

The court has the statutory authority to determine whether the findings of guilty and the sentence are correct in law and fact for all courts-martial reviewed under Article 66, UCMJ (about 96% of the Court's work), and to take corrective action if prejudicial error has occurred.

Such action includes setting aside or modifying the findings and/or the sentence, ordering a rehearing, and dismissing charges and specifications. Unless reversed by a higher court, such action is binding on all parties, including all officials of the United States. The court's published opinions are binding precedent for the conduct of courts-martial in the naval service.

The Courts of Criminal Appeals review cases for legal error, factual sufficiency, and sentence appropriateness. All other cases are subject to review by judge advocates under regulations issued by each service. After such review, the Judge Advocate General may refer a case to the appropriate Court of Criminal Appeals. The Courts of Criminal Appeals also have jurisdiction under Article 62 of the UCMJ to consider appeals by the United States of certain judicial rulings during trial. Review under Article 62 is limited to issues involving alleged legal errors.

Bluebook citation form for this Court is provided in Table T.1 (N-M. Ct. Crim. App.), The Bluebook: A Uniform System of Citation (Columbia law Review Ass'n et al. eds, 18th ed. 2005). The official reporters are West's Military Justice Reporter (M.J.) (1975–present) and Court Martial Reports (C.M.R.) (1951–75)

The next level of appeal from the NMCCA is the United States Court of Appeals for the Armed Forces (CAAF).

== Current composition ==
The judges may be commissioned officers or civilians. As of 2019, the Court is divided into three panels that are constituted as follows:

=== Panel 1 ===
- Chief Judge CAPT Michael C. Holifield., JAGC, USN
- Senior Judge Stuart Kirkby, JAGC, USN
- Judge Col Alison Daly, USMC

=== Panel 2 ===
- Senior Judge LtCol John Hackel, USMC
- Judge CDR Nathan Gross, JAGC, USN
- Judge LtCol Christopher Blosser, USMC

=== Panel 3 ===
- Senior Judge CAPT Colin Kisor, JAGC, USN
- Judge Col Alison Daly, USMC
- Judge CAPT Brian Mizer, JAGC, USN
- Note: judges may appear on more than one panel

== See also ==
- Army Court of Criminal Appeals
- Air Force Court of Criminal Appeals
- Coast Guard Court of Criminal Appeals
