= General article =

A general article, in military law (sometimes called "the Devil's Article") is a legal provision that authorizes punishment of military personnel on grounds that are less specific as to the particulars of the offense and as to the punishment, compared to most crimes in modern West European law. The offenses are likely to reflect the effect on the military and its mission than the form the offender's behavior takes, or to be stated in terms of established customs of warfare.

== History ==
The example of military decrees of the Swedish king Gustavus Adolphus in the early 17th century was followed in West European military units, often in the form of articles of war including a general article.

== United States ==
American military law has evolved from British roots, including the offense of conduct unbecoming an officer and a gentleman and, within each service, successive versions of general article that confer wide discretion upon courts martial.

Since 1951, Article 134 of the Uniform Code of Military Justice (UCMJ) has been the general article for all branches of the military.

Article 134 is a "catch-all" for many offenses that are not covered by other specific articles of the UCMJ. These other offenses, including their elements and punishments, are spelled out in Part IV, Punitive Articles (Paragraphs 60-113) of the Manual for Courts-Martial. They vary from kidnapping (para. 92) to disloyal statements (para. 72).

=== Statutory text ===
Article 134. General article:
Though not specifically mentioned in this chapter, all disorders and neglects to the prejudice of good order and discipline in the armed forces, all conduct of a nature to bring discredit upon the armed forces, and crimes and offenses not capital, of which persons subject to this chapter may be guilty, shall be taken cognizance of by a general, special, or summary court-martial, according to the nature and degree of the offense, and shall be punished at the discretion of that court.

— 10 U.S.C. § 934
