= Articles for the Government of the United States Navy =

American military law

The Articles for the Government of the United States Navy were the military laws of the United States Navy for much of its early history. The Articles were often referred to informally as "Rocks and Shoals", after the language of Article 4, Section 10:

The punishment of death, or such other punishment as a court martial may adjudge, may be inflicted on any person in the naval service...[who] intentionally or willfully suffers any vessel of the Navy to be stranded, or run upon rocks or shoals, or improperly hazarded or maliciously or willfully injures any vessel of the Navy, or any part of her tackle, armament, or equipment, whereby the safety the vessel is hazarded or the lives of the crew exposed to danger.

The Articles were replaced by the Uniform Code of Military Justice in 1951.

== In popular culture ==
Rocks and Shoals plays a major part in the first quarter of the Tom Clancy novel Clear and Present Danger, when the captain of a U.S. Coast Guard cutter decides to try a pair of pirates under its rules for rape and murder.
