= Cortney Lollar =

American law professor

- Occupations: James and Mary Lassiter Associate Professor of Law

Academic background
- Education: Brown University; New York University

Academic work
- Discipline: Criminal Law
- Sub-discipline: Women's and Gender Studies
- Institutions: Georgia State University; University of Kentucky

Cortney E. Lollar is a Professor of Law and the Faculty Director of the Center for Access to Justice at Georgia State University College of Law. She was formerly the James and Mary Lassiter Associate Professor of Law at the University of Kentucky. She focuses on criminal law and criminal procedure, with particular attention to the intersections of criminal law, remedies, race, gender, sexuality, and social science. She publishes on the mistreatment of impoverished women and women of color by the court systems.

In 1997, Lollar graduated magna cum laude at Brown University and earned her Juris Doctor degree from New York University in 2002.

In March 2013, Lollar testified before the United States Department of Defense's Judicial Proceedings Panel in Washington, D.C. to review and assess the judicial proceedings conducted under the Uniform Code of Military Justice involving adult sexual assault and related offenses. Lollar is against relying on the criminal system to award money for damages of certain, broad crimes, as she believes it will hurt the poorest convicted people.

Lollar has pushed the state of Kentucky to pass laws and acts to help parents provide better care for their children.
