= United States Army Court of Criminal Appeals =

United States Article I court

- (A.C.C.A.)
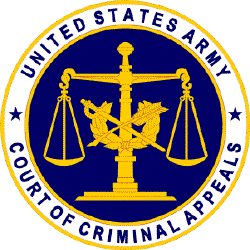
- Location: Fort Belvoir (Fairfax County, Virginia)
- Appeals to: Court of Appeals for the Armed Forces
- Established: 1968
- Authority: Article I tribunal
- Created by: Uniform Code of Military Justice
- Official website

The United States Army Court of Criminal Appeals (ACCA) is an appellate court within the United States military that reviews specific court-martial convictions of Army service members.

== Jurisdiction ==
In the United States, courts-martial are conducted under the Uniform Code of Military Justice (UCMJ), 10 U.S.C. §§ 801–946, and the Manual for Courts-Martial. If the trial results in a conviction, the case is reviewed by the convening authority – the person who referred the case for trial by court-martial. The convening authority has discretion to mitigate the findings and sentence.

If the sentence, as approved by the convening authority, includes death, a bad-conduct discharge, a dishonorable discharge, dismissal of an officer, or confinement for one year or more, the case is reviewed by an intermediate court. There are four such courts – the Army Court of Criminal Appeals, the Navy-Marine Corps Court of Criminal Appeals, the Air Force Court of Criminal Appeals, and the Coast Guard Court of Criminal Appeals.

After review by any of these intermediate courts, the next level of appeal is the United States Court of Appeals for the Armed Forces (CAAF).

== History ==
Until 1920, court-martial convictions were reviewed either by a commander in the field or by the President, depending on the severity of the sentence or the rank of the accused. The absence of formal review received critical attention during World War I, and the Army created an internal legal review process for a limited number of cases. Following the war, in the Act of June 4, 1920, Congress required the Army to establish Boards of Review, consisting of three lawyers, to consider cases involving death, dismissal of an officer, an unsuspended dishonorable discharge, or confinement in a penitentiary, with limited exceptions. The legislation further required legal review of other cases in the Office of the Judge Advocate General.

Later under the UCMJ, the Boards were empowered to "weigh the evidence, judge the credibility of witnesses, and determine controverted questions of fact, recognizing that the trial court saw and heard the witnesses." It also charged each board with affirm[ing] only such findings of guilty and the sentence or such part or amount of the sentence, as it finds correct in law and fact and determines, on the basis of the entire record, should be approved." Finally, the UCMJ made the decisions of the Army Boards of Military Review binding on the Judge Advocate General and, by implication, binding on the Secretary of the Army and the President as well.

The Military Justice Act of 1968 redesignated the Boards of Review as Courts of Military Review and provided each service court with a chief judge, appointed by the Judge Advocate General, and enabled the court to either sit en banc or in panels, empowering the chief judge to designate the senior, or presiding, judge for each panel. The All Writs Act empowers the court to issue extraordinary writs, such as habeas corpus, mandamus, and prohibition, in aid of its jurisdiction. The Military Justice Act of 1983 gave the court additional power to entertain interlocutory appeals by the Government from certain adverse trial rulings by the military judge. Congress also expanded the authority of the Judge Advocate General under UCMJ Article 69(a) to refer to the court records of trial other than those automatically reviewed by that Court under Article 66.

In 1994, the U.S. Army Court of Military Review was renamed the U.S. Army Court of Criminal Appeals. This coincided with the renaming of the U.S. Court of Military Appeals to the U.S. Court of Appeals for the Armed Forces (CAAF). More recently, the Judge Advocate General, by regulation, granted tenure to the appellate judges serving on the Army court, as well as the trial judges.

== Operation ==
Presently, the Army Court of Criminal Appeals is composed of three judicial panels, each with three appellate judges (one of which is the senior judge), a commissioner, and paralegal. The Chief Judge, while not assigned full-time to a single panel, sits on cases with judges from all three panels and has his own commissioner.

The military justice system commonly uses four writs: mandamus, prohibition, error coram nobis, and habeas corpus. A writ of mandamus is an order from a court of competent jurisdiction that requires the performance of a specified act by an inferior court or authority. The writ of prohibition is used to prevent the commission of a specified act or issuance of a particular order. The writ of error coram nobis is used to bring an issue before the court that previously decided the same issue. It allows the court to review error of fact or a retroactive change in the law that which affects the validity of the prior proceeding. The writ of habeas corpus is used to challenge either the legal basis for or the manner of confinement.

The court has the statutory authority to determine whether the findings of guilty and the sentence are correct in law and fact for all courts-martial reviewed under Article 66, UCMJ (about 96% of the court's work), and to take corrective action if prejudicial error has occurred.

Such action includes setting aside or modifying the findings and/or the sentence, ordering a rehearing, and dismissing charges and specifications. Unless reversed by a higher court, such action is binding on all parties, including all officials of the United States. The court's published opinions are binding precedent for the conduct of courts-martial in the Army.

The Courts of Criminal Appeals review cases for legal error, factual sufficiency, and sentence appropriateness. All other cases are subject to review by judge advocates under regulations issued by each service. After such review, the Judge Advocate General may refer a case to the appropriate Court of Criminal Appeals. The Courts of Criminal Appeals also have jurisdiction under Article 62 of the UCMJ to consider appeals by the United States of certain judicial rulings during trial. Review under Article 62 is limited to issues involving alleged legal errors.

Bluebook citation form for this Court is provided in Table T.1 (A. Ct. Crim. App.), The Bluebook: A Uniform System of Citation (Columbia law Review Ass'n et al. eds, 18th ed. 2005). The official reporters are West's Military Justice Reporter (M.J.) (1975–date) and Court Martial Reports (C.M.R.) (1951–1975).

== Current composition of the court ==
Presently, the U.S. Army Court of Criminal Appeals is composed of three judicial panels. Each panel includes three appellate judges (with one judge appointed as the senior judge of that panel) and a commissioner. The Chief Judge, while not assigned full-time to a single panel, sits on cases with judges from all three panels and is also assigned a chief commissioner. Colonel Andrew D. Flor became the chief judge on October 2, 2025.
