= Air Force Court of Criminal Appeals =

United States Article I court

United States Air Force Court of Criminal Appeals
- (A.F.C.C.A.)
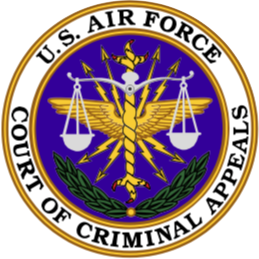
- Location: Joint Base Andrews (Prince George's County, Maryland)
- Appeals to: Court of Appeals for the Armed Forces
- Established: 1968
- Authority: Article I tribunal
- Created by: Uniform Code of Military Justice
- afcca.law.af.mil

The Air Force Court of Criminal Appeals (AFCCA) is an independent appellate judicial body authorized by Congress and established by the Judge Advocate General of the Air Force pursuant to the exclusive authority under 10 U.S.C. § 866(a). The Court hears and decides appeals of United States Air Force and Space Force court-martial convictions and appeals pendente lite. Its appellate judges are assigned to the Court by The Judge Advocate General. The Judge Advocate General instructs court-martial convening authorities to take action in accordance with the Court's decisions.

The Air Force Court of Criminal Appeals is located at Andrews Air Force Base in Prince George's County, Maryland.

== Jurisdiction ==
The court conducts mandatory review of all courts-martial of Air Force members referred to the court (unless waived by the appellant) pursuant to Articles 62, 66, 69, and 73 of the Uniform Code of Military Justice, and, when necessary in furtherance of its jurisdiction, reviews all petitions for extraordinary relief properly filed before it.

This includes:

1. all trials by court-martial in which the sentence includes confinement for one year or longer, a bad-conduct or dishonorable discharge, dismissal of a commissioned officer or cadet, or death;
2. all cases reviewed by the Judge Advocate General of the Air Force and forwarded for review under UCMJ Article 69(d);
3. certain government appeals of orders or rulings of military trial judges that terminate proceedings, exclude evidence, or which concern the disclosure of classified information; and
4. petitions for new trial referred by the Judge Advocate General; and
5. petitions for extraordinary relief, including writs of mandamus, writs of prohibition, writs of habeas corpus, and writs of error coram nobis.

The next level of appeal from the AFCCA is the United States Court of Appeals for the Armed Forces.

== Current composition of the court ==
The judges may be commissioned officers or civilians. As of 2019, the court is constituted as follows:

- Chief Judge Karen E. Mayberry
- Senior Judge John C. Johnson
- Senior Judge Julie J.R. Huygen
- Judge Richard A. Mink
- Judge Naomi P. Dennis
- Judge Tom E. Posch
- Judge Michael A. Lewis
- Judge James E. Key III
- Reserve Judge Joseph S. Kiefer
- Reserve Judge Lucy H. Carrillo
- Reserve Judge Michael D. Schag

== See also ==
- Army Court of Criminal Appeals
- Navy-Marine Corps Court of Criminal Appeals
- Coast Guard Court of Criminal Appeals
