= Manual for Courts-Martial =

United States military law manual

The Manual for Courts-Martial (MCM) is the official guide to the conduct of courts-martial in the United States military. An Executive Order of the President of the United States, the MCM details and expands on the military law established in the statute Uniform Code of Military Justice (UCMJ). It gathers both executive orders as well as opinions of said executive orders. The MCM contains five parts plus 22 appendices:

- Part I is the Preamble, which gives background and jurisdictional information
- Part II explains the Rules for Courts-martial (Rules 101 through 1307)
- Part III lays out the Military Rules of Evidence (Rules 101 through 1103)
- Part IV sets forth the elements and punishments of offenses (Punitive Articles, paragraphs 101 through 108)
- Part V provides guidelines for the imposition of non-judicial punishment (NJP)
- Appendices provide the Constitution of the United States, the UCMJ itself, analysis of the Parts, historical Executive Orders, forms, etc.

In June 2019, the Federal Register published the 2019 Manual for Courts-Martial with all recent changes.

== See also ==
- Air Force Court of Criminal Appeals
- Army Court of Criminal Appeals
- Coast Guard Court of Criminal Appeals
- Navy-Marine Corps Court of Criminal Appeals
- Uniform Code of Military Justice
