= Non-judicial punishment =

Military discipline beyond its judicial process

In the United States Armed Forces, non-judicial punishment (NJP) is a disciplinary measure that may be applied to individual military personnel, without a need for a court-martial or similar proceedings.

== General ==
In the United States Armed Forces, non-judicial punishment is a form of military justice authorized by Article 15 of the Uniform Code of Military Justice (UCMJ). Its rules are further elaborated on in various branch policies, as well as the Manual for Courts-Martial. NJP permits commanders to administratively discipline troops without a court-martial. Punishment can range from reprimand to reduction in rank, correctional custody, loss of pay, extra duty, or restrictions depending on rank of the imposing officer and receiving officer. The receipt of NJP does not constitute a criminal conviction (it is equivalent to a civil action), but is often placed in the service record of the individual. The process for it is governed by Part V of the Manual for Courts-Martial and by each service branch's regulations.

Non-judicial punishment proceedings are known by different terms among the services. In the Army and the Air Force, NJP is referred to as Article 15; in the Marine Corps it is called being "NJP'd", being sent to "Office Hours", or satirically among the junior ranks, "Ninja Punched". The Navy and the Coast Guard call NJP captain's mast or admiral's mast, depending on the rank of the commanding officer.

== Hearing ==
Prior to imposition of NJP, the commander notifies the accused of the commander's intention to impose punishment, the nature of the misconduct alleged, supporting evidence, and a statement of the accused's rights under the UCMJ. All service members, except those embarked or attached to a vessel currently away from its homeport, have a right to refuse NJP and request a court-martial. If the accused does not accept the NJP, the NJP hearing is terminated, and the commander must make the decision of whether to process the service member for court-martial. If the accused accepts NJP, the accused can choose to have a hearing or waive said right. If a hearing proceeds, the accused may choose to be accompanied by a spokesperson. The accused may present evidence and witnesses to the commander. The commander must consider any information offered during the hearing and must be personally convinced that the service member committed misconduct before imposing punishment.

== Punishments ==
Maximum penalties depend on the rank of the accused and that of the officer imposing punishment:

=== For officers accused of misconduct ===
If the officer imposing punishment holds general court-martial authority, or if the commanding officer is of the grade O-7 or greater (generals in the Army and Air Force, admirals in the Navy, U.S. Military Rank Insignia)

- Arrest in quarters: not more than 30 days
- Restriction to limits: not more than 60 days
- Forfeiture of pay: not more than ½ of one month's base pay for two months (base pay does not include allowances or special pay)
- Admonition or reprimand

By commanding officers of the grades O-4 to O-6 (majors to colonels in the Army and Air Force, lieutenants commanders to captains in the Navy, U.S. Military Rank Insignia)

- Restriction to limits: not more than 30 days
- Admonition or reprimand

By commanding officers of the grades O-1 to O-3 (lieutenants to captains in the Army and Air Force, ensigns and lieutenants in the Navy, U.S. Military Rank Insignia)

- Restriction to limits: not more than 15 days
- Admonition or reprimand

By officers in charge (OIC)

- No NJP authority over officers

=== For enlisted members accused of misconduct ===
Three types of non-judicial punishment are commonly imposed.

Summarized Article 15: (O-3 and below) commanders and commissioned OIC may impose:

- Restriction to specific limits (normally work, barracks, place of worship, mess hall, and medical facilities) for not more than 14 days
- Extra duties, including fatigue or other duties, for not more than 14 days
- Restriction with extra duties for not more than 14 days

Company grade (O-3 or below) commanders may impose the above plus:

- Correctional custody for not more than 7 days (only if accused is in the grades E-3 and below)
- Forfeiture of 7 days base pay
- Reduction by one grade, if original rank in promotion authority of imposing officer (USA/USAF E-4 and below)
- Admonition or reprimand, either written or verbal

Field grade (O-4 to O-6) may impose:

- Restriction for not more than 60 days, 45 days if extra duty is imposed.
- Extra duties for not more than 45 days
- Restriction with extra duties for not more than 45 days
- Correctional custody for not more than 30 days (only if accused is in the grades E-3 and below)
- Forfeiture of ½ of base pay for two months
- Reduction by one grade if (USA/USAF E-6 or E-5; USMC E-5 or below; USN E-6 or below); or reduction to E-1 (USA/USAF E-4 to E-2)
- Admonition or reprimand, either written or verbal

The punishments listed above may be combined (with certain limitations listed in the Manual for Courts-Martial, Part 5, Section 5(d)). For example, extra duties, restriction, forfeiture of pay, and reduction in grade could be imposed.

If the member considers the punishment to be unjust or to be disproportionate to the misconduct committed, the member may appeal the NJP to a higher authority. This is usually the next officer in the chain of command. Upon considering the appeal, the higher authorities may set aside the NJP, decrease the severity of the punishment, or may deny the appeal. They may not increase the severity of the punishment.

Personnel are permitted to refuse NJP in favor of a court-martial; this might be done in cases where they do not feel their commanding officer will give them a fair hearing, but this option exposes them to a possible criminal court conviction. Navy and Marine Corps personnel assigned to or embarked aboard ship do not have the option of refusing NJP, nor can they appeal the decision of the officer imposing punishment; they may only appeal the severity of the punishment.

== Mast ==
Video of a captain's mast in the U.S. Navy during the early 2000s, aboard USS Wyoming (SSBN-742).

PSA of a mock captain's mast in the U.S. Navy

In naval tradition, mast is the traditional location of the non-judicial hearing under which a commanding officer studies and disposes of cases involving those in their command. In the U.S. Navy and Coast Guard, these proceedings take place under the authority of Article 15 of the UCMJ.

If the individual conducting the proceeding is either a captain, or a lower ranking officer (typically a commander or lieutenant commander) serving as commanding officer of a naval or coast guard vessel, an aviation squadron, or similar command afloat or ashore, then the proceeding is referred to as a captain's mast.

If an admiral is overseeing the mast, then the procedure is referred to as an admiral's mast or a flag mast.

A captain's mast or admiral's mast is a procedure whereby the commanding officer must:

- Make inquiry into the facts surrounding minor offenses allegedly committed by a member of the command
- Afford the accused a hearing as to such offenses
- Dispose of such charges by dismissing the charges, imposing punishment under the provisions of military law or referring the case to a court-martial

A captain's mast is not:

- A trial, as the term "non-judicial" implies
- A conviction, even if punishment is imposed
- An acquittal, even if punishment is not imposed

The term mast may also refer to when a captain or commanding officer makes him/herself available to hear concerns, complaints, or requests from the crew. Traditionally, on a naval vessel, the captain would stand at the main mast of that vessel when holding mast. The crew, who by custom did not speak with the captain, could speak to him directly at these times. It could also refer to the naval punishment of tying one to a mast and lashing them with a whip.

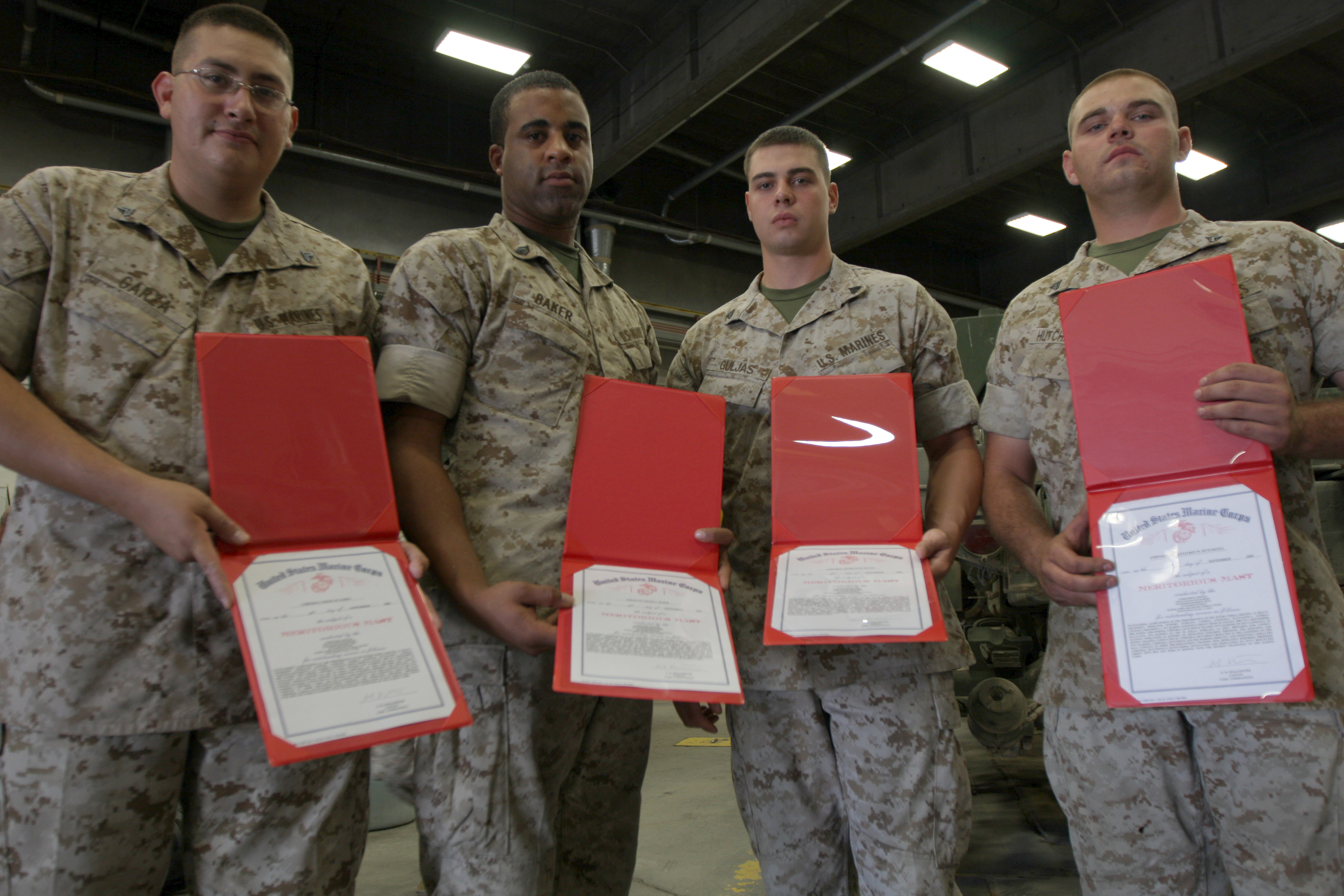
U.S. Marines with "meritorious mast" certificates

In modern times, a meritorious mast refers to the commanding officer taking this time to single out a member of the crew for praise and present written recognition of work well done.

== See also ==
- Military law
- Extrajudicial punishment
- Military tribunals in the United States
- Courts-martial in the United States
