= Uniform Code of Military Justice =

United States military law

The Uniform Code of Military Justice (UCMJ) is the foundation of the system of military justice of the armed forces of the United States. The UCMJ was established by the United States Congress in accordance with their constitutional authority, per Article I Section 8 of the U.S. Constitution, which provides that "The Congress shall have Power . . . to make Rules for the Government and Regulation of the land and naval forces" of the United States.

== History ==
On June 30, 1775, the Second Continental Congress established 69 Articles of War to govern the conduct of the Continental Army.

Effective upon its ratification in 1788, Article I, Section 8 of the United States Constitution provided that Congress has the power to regulate the land and naval forces. On 10 April 1806, the United States Congress enacted 101 Articles of War, which were not significantly revised until over a century later. Discipline in the sea services was provided under the Articles for the Government of the United States Navy, commonly referred to as Rocks and Shoals.

The Articles of War evolved during the first half of the twentieth century and were amended in 1916 and 1920. In 1948, Congress substantially reformed the Articles pursuant to the Selective Service Act of 1948, but its naval counterpart remained little changed. The military justice system continued to operate under the Articles of War and Articles for the Government of the Navy until May 31, 1951, when the Uniform Code of Military Justice came into effect.

The UCMJ was passed by Congress on 5 May 1950, and signed into law by President Harry S. Truman the next day. It took effect on May 31, 1951. The word uniform in the Code's title refers to its consistent application to all the armed services in place of the earlier Articles of War, Articles of Government, and Disciplinary Laws of the individual services. In addition to consolidating existing military law, the UCMJ created the United States Court of Appeals for the Armed Forces.

The UCMJ, the Rules for Courts-Martial (RCM) (analogous to the Federal Rules of Criminal Procedure), and the Military Rules of Evidence (analogous to the Federal Rules of Evidence) have evolved since their implementation. They have often paralleled the development of the federal civilian criminal justice system. In some ways, the UCMJ has been ahead of changes in the civilian criminal justice system. For example, a rights-warning statement similar to the Miranda warnings (and required in more contexts than in the civilian world where it is applicable only to custodial interrogation) was required by Article 31 a decade and a half before the U.S. Supreme Court ruled in Miranda v. Arizona. Article 38(b) continued the 1948 Articles of War guarantee that qualified defense counsel be provided to all accused without regard to indigence (and at earlier stages than required in civilian jurisdictions), whereas the U.S. Supreme Court only guaranteed the provision of counsel to indigents in Gideon v. Wainwright.

The role of what was originally a court-martial's non-voting "law member" developed into the present office of military judge whose capacity is little different from that of an Article III judge in a U.S. district court. At the same time, the "court-martial" itself, the panel of officers hearing the case and weighing the evidence, has converted from being essentially a board of inquiry/review presiding over the trial, into a jury of military service-members.

In 2013, at the Department of Defense's Judicial Proceedings Panel, Cortney Lollar testified that the UCMJ needed to be updated to improve the sections regarding sexual assault.

The current version of the UCMJ is printed in the latest edition of the Manual for Courts-Martial (2019), incorporating changes made by the president (executive orders) and National Defense Authorization Acts of 2006 and 2007.

== Jurisdiction ==
=== Courts-martial ===
Courts-martial are conducted under the UCMJ and the Manual for Courts-Martial (MCM). If the trial results in a conviction, the case is reviewed by the convening authority – the commanding officer who referred the case for trial by court-martial. The power of the convening authority was reduced in 2014.

If the sentence, as approved by the convening authority, includes death, a bad conduct discharge, a dishonorable discharge, dismissal of an officer, or confinement for one year or more, the case is reviewed by an intermediate court. There are four such courts – the Army Court of Criminal Appeals, the Navy-Marine Corps Court of Criminal Appeals, the Air Force Court of Criminal Appeals, and the Coast Guard Court of Criminal Appeals.

After review by any of these intermediate courts, the next level of appeal is the United States Court of Appeals for the Armed Forces (CAAF). The Supreme Court of the United States has discretion under 28 U.S.C. § 1259 to review cases under the UCMJ on direct appeal where the CAAF has conducted a mandatory review (death penalty and certified cases), granted discretionary review of a petition, or otherwise granted relief. If the CAAF denies a petition for review or a writ appeal, consideration by the Supreme Court may be obtained only through collateral review (e.g., a writ of habeas corpus). Since 2007, several bills have been introduced into Congress to expand the accessibility of service members to the Supreme Court.

=== Personal jurisdiction ===
Within the exceptions below, as codified in Article 2 of the UCMJ, personal jurisdiction attaches, regardless of the physical global location of the service member, over all members of the Uniformed Services of the United States: the Army, Marine Corps, Navy, Air Force, Space Force, Coast Guard, NOAA Commissioned Officer Corps, and Public Health Service Commissioned Corps.

While the Coast Guard is administered under Title 14 of the United States Code when not operating as part of the U.S. Navy, individuals commissioned or enlisted in the Coast Guard are subject to the UCMJ as an armed force. Commissioned members of the NOAA and PHS, as uniformed services, are only subject to the UCMJ when attached or detailed to a military unit by competent orders, or when militarized by presidential executive order during a national emergency or declaration of war.

Members of the military Reserve Components under Title 10 of the United States Code (Army Reserve, Marine Forces Reserve, Navy Reserve, and Air Force Reserve), or Title 14 of the United States Code, Coast Guard Reserve when not operating as part of the U.S. Navy, are subject to the UCMJ when they are:

1. Full-Time Support (FTS) personnel on active duty orders serving pursuant to the authority of 10 USC 10211 or 10 USC 12310, including:
  1. Army/Air Force "Active Guard and Reserve (AGR),"
  2. Navy "Full-time Support (FTS),"
  3. Marine Corps "Active Reserve (AR)," or
  4. Coast Guard "Reserve Program Administrators (RPA)."
2. "Traditional" reservists performing either:
  1. Full-time active duty service under orders for a specific period, i.e., Annual Training, Active Duty for Training, Active Duty for Operational Support, Active Duty Special Work, Mobilization or Recall to Active Duty, Canvasser Recruiter, etc., or
  2. Performing part-time Inactive Duty, i.e., Inactive Duty Training, Inactive Duty Travel and Training, Unit Training Assembly, Additional Training Periods, Additional Flying Training Periods, Reserve Management Periods, etc., all of which are colloquially known as "drills."
  3. Retired Reservists who are either recalled to active duty pursuant to secretarial authority, or who are receiving medical treatment in an armed forces hospital (see below).

Soldiers and airmen in the National Guard of the United States are subject to the UCMJ only if activated (mobilized or recalled to active duty) in a federal capacity under Title 10 by an executive order issued by the president, or during their annual training periods, which are orders issued under Title 10, during which periods of duty they are federalized into the National Guard of the United States. Otherwise, members of the National Guard are usually exempt from the UCMJ. However, under Title 32 orders, or State Active Duty orders issued directly under State authority, individual members of the Army National Guard and Air National Guard are still subject to their respective state codes of military justice, which often resemble the UCMJ very closely, and/or their state civil and criminal laws.

Several States also authorize either naval or military organized militia forces. These are collectively known as the State Guard. State Guard organizations are organized, trained, equipped, armed, disciplined, and administered under each State's own sovereign authority, and are not subject to a Federal recall to active duty, nor are the individual members subject to the UCMJ in their capacities as members of the State Guard. State Guard organizations typically are organized similarly to a military force, and usually report to the senior National Guard officer in each State, known as the Adjutant General.

In this sense, the State Guard are auxiliaries to each State's Constitutionally authorized organized militia forces, the Army and Air National Guard. The State Guard is often specialized, based on each state's requirements, for missions such as wilderness search and rescue, light aviation, forest firefighting, law enforcement, or general emergency management roles. Under each state's own authorities, State Guard members may be ordered to State Active Duty (SAD), in a status similar to National Guard members in a Title 32 status but solely under state authority and discipline, and also may be provided with the training, equipment, and authority to act as law enforcement officers with powers of arrest.

Each state sets the requirements to join, remain, be promoted or rewarded, and conditions of employment such as a minimum amount of duty performed in a year, and whether any duty is paid or unpaid, and whether the individuals are covered by various civil service or retirement pension plans. Most State Guard duty is performed without pay, in a volunteer status. While the State Guard organizations are subject to recall to SAD, or other workforce requirements as imposed by their state, they are not subject to either partial or full mobilization authorities under Title 10.

However, the individual State Guard members often have dual-status as both State Guard and a federally recognized uniformed services member, such as a Texas State Guard officer who is also a retired U.S. military officer. Such an individual could be recalled to active duty under both SAD as a State Guard member, or under one of the various authorities to recall retired or reserve military members to active duty (10 USC 688, various 10 USC 123XX authorities, and others), but not both because a federal status trumps a state status. State Guard members could thus be subject to the UCMJ at all times under their federal status, and under specific state military and civil/criminal codes under their state status.

Cadets and midshipmen at the United States Military Academy, United States Naval Academy, United States Air Force Academy, and United States Coast Guard Academy, are subject to the UCMJ at all times because they are in an active duty status as members of the regular component while serving at a Military Service Academy, per Article 2(a)(2) of UCMJ. Army and Air Force Reserve Officers' Training Corps (ROTC) cadets are not subject to the UCMJ, except while on inactive or active duty training. Midshipmen of the United States Merchant Marine Academy and Navy ROTC (including marine-option) midshipmen are also subject to the UCMJ when on inactive or active duty for training orders.

Members of military auxiliaries such as the Civil Air Patrol and the Coast Guard Auxiliary are not subject to the UCMJ, even when participating in missions assigned by the military or other branches of government. However, members of the Coast Guard Auxiliary can be called by the Commandant of the Coast Guard into the Temporary Reserve of the Coast Guard, in which case they become subject to the UCMJ.

Additionally, the following categories of service members are subject to the UCMJ as indicated:

1. Retired members of the regular component who are entitled to retirement pay, per Article 2(a)(4) of UCMJ, regardless of the authority under which retired from active service and transferred to the retired list of their respective service's regular component,
2. Retired members of the reserve component, whether entitled to retired pay or awaiting retired pay at age 60 as a gray area reserve retiree, who are receiving hospital care from an armed force, per Article 2(a)(5) of UCMJ,
3. Members of the Fleet Reserve/Fleet Marine Corps Reserve (FR/FMCR), as enlisted retired Navy or Marine Corps personnel who have not yet served a total of 30 years of combined active, fleet reserve, and retired service, per Article 2(a)(6) of UCMJ. Both regular component and reserve component enlisted retirees are transferred to the FR/FMCR upon retirement if they have less than 30 total years, but more than 20 cumulative years of active service, and remain subject to the UCMJ in that status until they complete 30 total years of active and fleet reserve service, and are transferred to their respective original Service Retired List (regular component or retired reserve). The FR/FMCR is not applicable to any officers, any service member retired for disability and transferred to the Temporary or Permanent Disability Retired Lists, nor any enlisted retirees except those of the Navy and Marine Corps as noted above.
4. Persons in custody of the U.S. Armed Forces serving a sentence imposed by a court-martial, per Article 2(a)(7) of UCMJ,
5. Members of the National Oceanic and Atmospheric Administration, Public Health Service, and other organizations, when assigned to and serving with the armed forces, per Article 2(a)(8) of UCMJ,
6. Prisoners of War (POW)/Enemy Prisoners of War (EPW) in the custody of the U.S. Armed Forces, per Article 2(a)(9) of UCMJ,
7. In time of declared war or a contingency operation, persons serving with or accompanying a U.S. armed force in the field, per Article 2(a)(10), and
8. Detained medical personnel and military chaplains in the custody of the U.S. Armed Forces.

Civilians are not subject to UCMJ. However, the federal government has exclusive jurisdiction over crimes committed on a military installation. A military investigation may be conducted to determine whether or not to prosecute a civilian who commits a crime on a military base. Civilians are not otherwise subject to military law, even when the crime is committed against a service member. When a civilian bus driver murdered an Army private off post in 1942, for example, the post commander was unable to investigate.

==== Military contractors ====
Historically, the UCMJ applied to "persons serving with or accompanying an armed force in the field" and thus included military contractors "in time of war." In the John Warner National Defense Authorization Act for Fiscal Year 2007, which was enacted in 2006, Congress expanded the UCMJ's applicability to cover contractors during a "declared war or contingency operation." The change came following the Nisour Square massacre perpetrated by Blackwater Security personnel.

In 2008, the first contractor was prosecuted under the new provision, marking the first time since 1968 that a contractor had been charged under military law. The civilian defendant, a dual Canadian-Iraqi citizen, was charged with stabbing a co-worker, another Iraqi civilian. The contractor ultimately pleaded guilty.

=== Non-judicial punishment ===
Under Article 15 of the Code (Subchapter III), specified military commanders have the authority to exercise non-judicial punishment (NJP) over their subordinates for minor breaches of discipline. These punishments are carried out after a hearing before the commander but without a judge and jury. For enlisted members, punishments are limited to a reduction in rank, loss of pay, restriction of privileges, extra-duty, reprimands, and, aboard ships, confinement. Guidelines for the imposition of NJP are contained in Part V of the Manual for Courts-Martial and the various service regulations.

=== Complaints of wrongs and loss of property ===
The UCMJ provides that any service member may bring a "complaint of wrongs" against their commanding officer to the next senior officer exercising general court-martial authority over their commander. That officer will investigate the complaint of wrongs, and then report the findings of the investigation to the service Secretary (i.e., Secretary of the Army, Navy, Air Force) concerned. Following said findings an investigation board can be convened to investigate and adjudicate claims of willful damage, destruction, or theft of personal property, only if both parties are subject to the Code.

== Current subchapters ==
The UCMJ is found in Title 10, Subtitle A, Part II, Chapter 47 of the United States Code.

Subchapter	Title	Section	Articles
I	General Provisions	§ 801	1–6
II	Apprehension and Restraint	§ 807	7–14
III	Non-Judicial Punishment	§ 815	15
IV	Court-Martial Jurisdiction	§ 816	16–21
V	Composition of Courts-Martial	§ 822	22–29
VI	Pre-Trial Procedure	§ 830	30–35
VII	Trial Procedure	§ 836	36–54
VIII	Sentences	§ 855	55–58
IX	Post-Trial Procedure and Review of Courts-Martial	§ 859	59–76
X	Punitive Articles	§ 877	77–134
XI	Miscellaneous Provisions	§ 935	135–140
XII	Court of Appeals for the Armed Forces	§ 941	141–146

=== General provisions ===
Subchapter I, "General Provisions" has six sections (articles):

Section	Article	Title
§ 801	1	Definitions
§ 802	2	Persons subject to this chapter
§ 803	3	Jurisdiction to try certain personnel
§ 804	4	Dismissed officer's right to trial by court-martial
§ 805	5	Territorial applicability of this chapter
§ 806	6	Judge advocates and legal officers
§ 806a	6a	Investigation and disposition of matters pertaining to the fitness of military judges

Article 1 (Definitions), defines the following terms used in the rest of the UCMJ: Judge Advocate General, the Navy, officer in charge, superior commissioned officer, cadet, midshipman, military, accuser, military judge, law specialist, legal officer, judge advocate, record, classified information, and national security. This article also provides that, "The Navy, the Marine Corps, and the Coast Guard when it is operating as a service in the Navy, shall be considered as one armed force" for the purposes of the UCMJ.

=== Pre-trial procedure ===
Section	Article	Title
§ 830	30	Charges and specifications
§ 831	31	Compulsory self-incrimination prohibited
§ 832	32	Investigation
§ 833	33	Forwarding of charges
§ 834	34	Advice of staff judge advocate and reference for trial
§ 835	35	Service of charges

Under Article 31, coercive self-incrimination is prohibited as a right under the Fifth Amendment. Apprehending officers utilize the Article 31 warning and waiver to prevent this self-incrimination, much like the Miranda warning. Article 31 was already well-established before Miranda.

Article 32 refers to the pre-trial investigation and hearing conducted before charges are referred to trial for court-martial. It may be conducted by a Judge Advocate General (JAG) officer or non-JAG officer.

=== Punitive articles ===
Subchapter X, "Punitive Articles", is the subchapter that details offenses under the uniform code. The 2019 MCM incorporates both major and minor changes to certain articles, and relocates many articles; careful examination of the source document is required to ensure full understanding, and previous "cheat sheets" and training materials may therefore be outdated. Those articles with a title annotated by "*" were changed from the 2016 MCM:

Section	Article	Title
§ 877	77	Principals
§ 878	78	*Accessory after the fact
§ 879	79	*Conviction of offense charged, lesser included offense, and attempts
§ 880	80	*Attempts
§ 881	81	Conspiracy
§ 882	82	*Soliciting commission of offenses
§ 883	83	*Malingering
§ 884	84	*Breach of medical quarantine
§ 885	85	Desertion
§ 886	86	Absence without leave
§ 887	87	*Missing movement; jumping from vessel
§ 887a	87a	*Resistance, flight, breach of arrest, and escape
§ 887b	87b	*Offenses against correctional custody and restriction
§ 888	88	Contempt toward officials
§ 889	89	*Disrespect toward superior commissioned officer; assault of superior commissioned officer
§ 890	90	*Willfully disobeying superior commissioned officer
§ 891	91	Insubordinate conduct toward warrant officer, noncommissioned officer, or petty officer
§ 892	92	Failure to obey order or regulation
§ 893	93	*Cruelty and maltreatment
§ 893a	93a	*Prohibited activities with military recruit or trainee by person in position of special trust
§ 894	94	Mutiny or sedition
§ 895	95	*Offenses by sentinel or lookout
§ 895a	95a	*Disrespect toward sentinel or lookout
§ 896	96	*Release of prisoner without proper authority; drinking with prisoner
§ 897	97	Unlawful detention
§ 898	98	*Misconduct as prisoner
§ 899	99	Misbehavior before the enemy
§ 900	100	Subordinate compelling surrender
§ 901	101	Improper use of countersign
§ 902	102	Forcing a safeguard
§ 903	103	*Spies
§ 903a	103a	*Espionage
§ 903b	103b	*Aiding the enemy
§ 904	104	*Public records offenses
§ 904a	104a	*Fraudulent enlistment, appointment, or separation
§ 904b	104b	*Unlawful enlistment, appointment, or separation
§ 905	105	*Forgery
§ 905a	105a	*False or unauthorized pass offenses
§ 906	106	*Impersonation of officer, noncommissioned or petty officer, or agent or official
§ 906a	106a	*Wearing unauthorized insignia, decoration, badge, ribbon, device, or lapel button
§ 907	107	*False official statements; false swearing
§ 907a	107a	*Parole violation
§ 908	108	*Military property of the United States—Loss, damage, destruction, or wrongful disposition
§ 908a	108a	*Captured or abandoned property
§ 909	109	*Property other than military property of United States–Waste, spoilage, or destruction
§ 909a	109a	*Mail matter: wrongful taking, opening, etc
§ 910	110	*Improper hazarding of vessel or aircraft
§ 911	111	*Leaving scene of vehicle accident
§ 912	112	*Drunkenness and other incapacitation offenses
§ 912a	112a	Wrongful use, possession, etc., of controlled substances
§ 913	113	*Drunken or reckless operation of a vehicle, aircraft, or vessel
§ 914	114	*Endangerment offenses
§ 915	115	*Communicating threats
§ 916	116	Riot or breach of peace
§ 917	117	Provoking speeches or gestures
§ 918	118	*Murder
§ 919	119	*Manslaughter
§ 919a	119a	*Death or injury of an unborn child
§ 919b	119b	*Child endangerment
§ 920	120	*Rape and sexual assault generally
§ 920a	120a	*Mails: deposit of obscene matter
§ 920b	120b	*Rape and sexual assault of a child
§ 920c	120c	*Other sexual misconduct
§ 921	121	*Larceny and wrongful appropriation
§ 921a	121a	*Fraudulent use of credit cards, debit cards, and other access devices
§ 921b	121b	*False pretenses to obtain services
§ 922	122	*Robbery
§ 922a	122a	*Receiving stolen property
§ 923	123	*Offenses concerning Government computers
§ 923a	123a	*Making, drawing, or uttering check, draft, or order without sufficient funds
§ 924	124	*Frauds against the United States
§ 924a	124a	*Bribery
§ 924b	124b	*Graft
§ 925	125	*Kidnapping
§ 926	126	*Arson; burning property with intent to defraud
§ 927	127	Extortion
§ 928	128	*Assault
§ 928a	128a	*Maiming
§ 929	129	*Burglary; unlawful entry
§ 930	130	*Stalking
§ 931	131	Perjury
§ 931a	131a	*Subornation of perjury
§ 931b	131b	*Obstructing justice
§ 931c	131c	*Misprision of serious offense
§ 931d	131d	*Wrongful refusal to testify
§ 931e	131e	*Prevention of authorized seizure of property
§ 931f	131f	*Noncompliance with procedural rules
§ 931g	131g	*Wrongful interference with adverse administrative proceeding
§ 932	132	*Retaliation
§ 933	133	*Conduct unbecoming an officer and a gentleman
§ 934	134	*General article

==== General article (Article 134) ====
The general article (Article 134) authorizes the prosecution of offenses not specifically detailed by any other article: "...all disorders and neglects to the prejudice of good order and discipline in the armed forces, all conduct of a nature to bring discredit upon the armed forces, and crimes and offenses not capital, of which persons subject to this chapter may be guilty."

Clause 1 of the article involves disorders and neglect, "...to the prejudice of good order and discipline in the armed forces." Clause 2 involves, "...conduct of a nature to bring discredit upon the armed forces." Clause 3 deals with non-capital offenses violating other federal law; under this clause, any such offense created by federal statute may be prosecuted under Article 134. United States v. Perkins, 47 C.M.R. 259 (Air Force Ct. of Military Review 1973).

The most recent version of the Manual for Courts-Martial lists the following offenses commonly prosecuted under Article 134:

- Animal abuse
- Bigamy
- Check, worthless making and uttering – by dishonorably failing to maintain funds
- Child pornography
- Dishonorably failing to pay debt
- Disloyal statement
- Disorderly conduct, drunkenness
- Extramarital sexual conduct
- Discharging firearm through negligence
- Fraternization
- Gambling with subordinate
- Negligent homicide
- Indecent conduct
- Indecent language
- Pandering and prostitution
- Self-injury without intent to avoid service
- Sexual act with an animal
- Straggling
- Visual depiction, nonconsensual distribution or broadcast

== See also ==
- Judge Advocate General's Corps
- Manual for Courts-Martial
- Military law
- Military tribunal
- Military courtesy
- Military expression
- Laws of war
- Lieber Code, Union army during the Civil War
- Geneva Conventions
- Code of Service Discipline, a Canadian equivalent to the UCMJ
