= Convening authority (court-martial) =

Individual in US military law

In United States military law, a convening authority is an individual with certain legal powers granted under either the Uniform Code of Military Justice (i.e. the regular military justice system) or the Military Commissions Act of 2009 (for the Guantanamo military commissions).

== Uniform Code of Military Justice ==
The term convening authority is used in the Uniform Code of Military Justice (UCMJ) when referring to an individual whose function is of critical importance in the US military justice system. The persons who may exercise this authority are defined in article 22 (10 U.S.C. § 822) for general court-martial, article 23 (10 U.S.C. § 823) for special court-martial, and article 24 (10 U.S.C. § 824) for summary court-martial. The convening authority decides on the disposition of cases to investigation and trial, and also selects the members of a court-martial.

The appointees serve as the military judge and members of the "panel", which decides the guilt or innocence of a person standing trial before the court-martial or military commission. Enlisted members on trial may demand that enlisted members be included on the panel. The court-martial then reports back to the convening authority their recommended verdict.

Unlike a civilian trial, the convening authority's "command prerogative" entitles them to amend or overturn the sentence of a court-martial. However, the convening authority may not set aside a finding of not guilty or increase the severity of a recommended punishment.

While normally only exercised in practice by members of the armed forces, six civilian officials can also act as a convening authority: the President, the Secretary of Defense, the three "service secretaries" (the Secretary of the Army, Secretary of the Navy, and Secretary of the Air Force), and the Secretary of Homeland Security (when the United States Coast Guard is under the United States Department of Homeland Security and has not been transferred to the Department of the Navy under the Department of Defense).

== Military Commissions Act ==
The individual in overall charge of the Guantanamo military commissions is also called the convening authority. Their position broadly mirrors the provisions found in the Uniform Code of Military Justice. The first three incumbents were civilian officials, although the first and third incumbents, John D. Altenburg and Bruce MacDonald, were retired military flag officers. Susan J. Crawford, the second convening authority, had been a long-term senior civilian lawyer for the Department of Defense, eventually serving as the Inspector General.

== See also ==
- Military Commissions Act of 2006
