= Title 10 of the United States Code =

U.S. federal statutes on the military

Title 10 of the United States Code addresses the armed forces of the United States. 10 USC § 101 defines the "armed forces" as the Army, Navy, Air Force, Marine Corps, Space Force, and Coast Guard. It provides the legal basis for the roles, missions and organization of each of the services as well as the United States Department of Defense. Each of the five subtitles deals with a separate aspect or component of the armed services.

- Subtitle A—General Military Law, defines the armed forces, and includes the Uniform Code of Military Justice
- Subtitle B—Army
- Subtitle C—Navy and Marine Corps
- Subtitle D—Air Force and Space Force
- Subtitle E—Reserve Components
- Subtitle F—Alternative Military Personnel Systems

The current Title 10 was the result of an overhaul and renumbering of the former Title 10 and Title 34 into one title by an act of Congress on August 10, 1956. The provisions of United States Code within Title 10 that are outlined in this article are up to date as of March 13, 2024.

Title 32 outlines the related but different legal basis for the roles, missions and organization of the United States National Guard in the United States Code. Laws regarding the National Guard in federal service are in Title 10, Chapter 1211.

== Subtitle A — General Military Law ==
Subtitle A

=== Part I — Organization and General Military Powers ===
Part I

- Chapter 1 — Definitions, rules of construction, cross-references, and related matters
- Chapter 2 — Department of Defense
- Chapter 3 — General powers and functions
- Chapter 4 — Office of the Secretary of Defense
- Chapter 5 — Joint Chiefs of Staff
- Chapter 6 — Combatant commands
- Chapter 7 — Boards, councils, and committees
- Chapter 8 — Defense agencies and Department of Defense field activities
- Chapter 9 — Defense budget matters
- Chapter 9A — Audit
- Chapter 11 — Reserve components
- Chapter 12 — The militia
- Chapter 13 — Insurrection
- Chapter 14 — Arming of American vessels
- Chapter 15 — Military support for civilian law enforcement agencies
- Chapter 16 — Security cooperation
- Chapter 19 — Cyber and information operations matters
- Chapter 20 — Humanitarian and other assistance
- Chapter 21 — Department of Defense intelligence matters
- Chapter 22 — National Geospatial-Intelligence Agency
- Chapter 23 — Miscellaneous studies and reports
- Chapter 24 — Nuclear posture
- Chapter 25 — Electromagnetic Warfare

=== Part II — Personnel ===
Part II

- Chapter 31 — Enlistments
- Chapter 32 — Officer strength and distribution in grade
- Chapter 33 — Original appointments of regular officers in grades above warrant officer grades
- Chapter 33A — Appointment, promotion, and involuntary separation and retirement for members on the warrant officer active-duty list
- Chapter 34 — Appointments as reserve officers
- Chapter 35 — Temporary appointments in officer grades
- Chapter 36 — Promotion, separation, and involuntary retirement of officers on the active-duty list
- Chapter 37 — General service requirements
- Chapter 38 — Joint officer management
- Chapter 39 — Active duty
- Chapter 40 — Leave
- Chapter 41 — Special appointments, assignments, details, and duties
- Chapter 43 — Rank and command
- Chapter 45 — The uniform
- Chapter 47 — Uniform Code of Military Justice
- Chapter 47A — Military commissions
- Chapter 48 — Military correctional facilities
- Chapter 49 — Miscellaneous prohibitions and penalties
- Chapter 50 — Miscellaneous command responsibilities
- Chapter 51 — Reserve components: Standards and procedures for retention and promotion
- Chapter 53 — Miscellaneous rights and benefits
- Chapter 54 — Commissary and exchange benefits
- Chapter 55 — Medical and dental care
- Chapter 56 — Department of Defense Medicare-eligible retiree health care fund
- Chapter 57 — Decorations and awards
- Chapter 58 — Benefits and services for members being separated or recently separated
- Chapter 59 — Separation
- Chapter 60 — Separation of regular officers for substandard performance of duty or for certain other reasons
- Chapter 61 — Retirement or separation for physical disability
- Chapter 63 — Retirement for age
- Chapter 65 — Retirement of warrant officers for length of service
- Chapter 67 — Retired pay for non-regular service
- Chapter 69 — Retired grade
- Chapter 71 — Computation of retired pay
- Chapter 73 — Annuities based on retired or retainer pay
- Chapter 74 — Department of Defense Military Retirement Fund
- Chapter 75 — Deceased personnel
- Chapter 76 — Missing persons
- Chapter 77 — Posthumous commissions and warrants
- Chapter 79 — Correction of military records
- Chapter 80 — Miscellaneous investigation requirements and other duties
- Chapter 81 — Civilian employees
- Chapter 83 — Civilian Defense Intelligence Employees
- Chapter 87 — Defense Acquisition Workforce
- Chapter 88 — Military family programs and military child care

=== Part III — Training and Education ===
Part III

- Chapter 101 — Training generally
- Chapter 102 — Junior Reserve Officers' Training Corps
- Chapter 103 — Senior Reserve Officers' Training Corps
- Chapter 104 — Uniformed Services University of the Health Sciences
- Chapter 105 — Armed Forces Health Professions Financial Assistance Programs
- Chapter 106 — Educational Assistance for Members of the Selected Reserve
- Chapter 106A — Educational Assistance for Persons Enlisting for Active Duty
- Chapter 107 — Professional Military Education
- Chapter 108 — Department of Defense Schools
- Chapter 109 — Educational Loan Repayment Programs
- Chapter 110 — Educational Assistance for Members Held as Captives and Their Dependents
- Chapter 111 — Support of Science, Mathematics, and Engineering Education
- Chapter 112 — Cyber Scholarship Program
- Chapter 113 — Defense Civilian Training Corps

=== Part IV — Service, Supply, and Property ===
Part IV

- Chapter 131 — Planning and Coordination
- Chapter 133 — Facilities for Reserve Components
- Chapter 134 — Miscellaneous Administrative Provisions
- Chapter 135 — Space Programs
- Chapter 136 — Provisions Relating to Specific Programs
- Chapter 138 — Cooperative Agreements with NATO Allies and Other Countries
- Chapter 141 — Miscellaneous Provisions Relating to Property
- Chapter 143 — Production by Military Agencies
- Chapter 145 — Cataloging and Standardization
- Chapter 146 — Contracting for Performance of Civilian Commercial or Industrial Type Functions
- Chapter 147 — Commissaries and Exchanges and Other Morale, Welfare, and Recreation Activities
- Chapter 152 — Issue of Supplies, Services, and Facilities
- Chapter 153 — Exchange of Material and Disposal of Obsolete, Surplus, or Unclaimed Property
- Chapter 155 — Acceptance of Gifts and Services
- Chapter 157 — Transportation
- Chapter 159 — Real Property; Related Personal Property; and Lease of Non-Excess Property
- Chapter 160 — Environmental Restoration
- Chapter 161 — Property Records and Report of Theft or Loss of Certain Property
- Chapter 163 — Military Claims
- Chapter 165 — Accountability and Responsibility
- Chapter 169 — Military Construction and Military Family Housing
- Chapter 172 — Strategic Environmental Research and Development Program
- Chapter 173 — Energy Security

=== Part V — Acquisition ===
Part V

- Subpart A — General
  - Chapter 201 — Definitions
  - Chapter 203 — General matters
  - Chapter 205 — Defense acquisition system
  - Chapter 207 — Budgeting and appropriations
  - Chapter 209 — Operational contract support
- Subpart B — Acquisition Planning
  - Chapter 221 — Planning and solicitation generally
  - Chapter 222 — Independent cost estimation and cost analysis
  - Chapter 223 — Other provisions relating to planning and solicitation generally
- Subpart C — Contracting Methods and Contract Types
  - Chapter 241 — Awarding of contracts
  - Chapter 242 — Specific types of contracts
  - Chapter 243 — Other matters relating to awarding of contracts
  - Chapter 244 — Undefinitized contractual actions
  - Chapter 245 — Task and delivery order contracts (multiple award contracts)
  - Chapter 247 — Procurement of commercial products and commercial services
  - Chapter 249 — Multiyear contracts
  - Chapter 251 — Simplified acquisition procedures
  - Chapter 253 — Rapid acquisition procedures
  - Chapter 255 — Contracting with or through other agencies
  - Chapter 257 — Contracts for long-term lease or charter of vessels, aircraft, and combat vehicles
  - Chapter 258 — Other types of contracts used for procurements for particular purposes
- Subpart D — General Contracting Provisions
  - Chapter 271 — Truthful cost or pricing data (Truth in negotiations)
  - Chapter 273 — Allowable costs
  - Chapter 275 — Proprietary contractor data and rights in technical data
  - Chapter 277 — Contract financing
  - Chapter 279 — Contractor audits and accounting
  - Chapter 281 — Claims and disputes
  - Chapter 287 — Other contracting programs
- Subpart E — Research and Engineering
  - Chapter 301 — Research and engineering generally
  - Chapter 303 — Research and engineering activities
  - Chapter 305 — Universities
  - Chapter 307 — Test and evaluation
- Subpart F — Major Systems, Major Defense Acquisition Programs, and Weapon Systems Development
  - Chapter 321 — General matters
  - Chapter 322 — Major systems and major defense acquisition programs generally
  - Chapter 323 — Life-cycle and sustainment
  - Chapter 324 — Selected acquisition reports
  - Chapter 325 — Cost growth—unit cost reports (Nunn-McCurdy)
  - Chapter 327 — Weapon systems development and related matters
- Subpart G — Other Special Categories Of Contracting
  - Chapter 341 — Acquisition of services generally
  - Chapter 345 — Acquisition of information technology
- Subpart H — Contract Management
  - Chapter 361 — Contract administration
  - Chapter 363 — Prohibition and penalties
  - Chapter 365 — Contractor workforce
  - Chapter 367 — Other administrative matters
- Subpart I — Defense Industrial Base
  - Chapter 381 — Defense industrial base generally
  - Chapter 382 — Policies and planning
  - Chapter 383 — Development, application, and support of dual-use technologies
  - Chapter 384 — Manufacturing technology
  - Chapter 385 — Other technology base policies and programs
  - Chapter 387 — Small business programs
  - Chapter 388 — Procurement technical assistance cooperative agreement program
  - Chapter 389 — Loan guarantee programs

== Subtitle B — Army ==
Subtitle B

=== Part I — Organization ===
Part I

- Chapter 701 — Definitions
- Chapter 703 — Department of the Army
- Chapter 705 — The Army Staff
- Chapter 707 — The Army

=== Part II — Personnel ===
Part II

- Chapter 711 — Strength
- Chapter 713 — Enlistments
- Chapter 715 — Appointments in the Regular Army
- Chapter 719 — Temporary appointments
- Chapter 721 — Active duty
- Chapter 723 — Special appointments, assignments, details, and duties
- Chapter 725 — Rank and command
- Chapter 729 — Miscellaneous prohibitions and penalties
- Chapter 733 — Miscellaneous rights and benefits
- Chapter 735 — Hospitalization
- Chapter 737 — Decorations and awards
- Chapter 741 — Retirement for length of service
- Chapter 743 — Retired grade
- Chapter 745 — Computation of retired pay
- Chapter 747 — Civilian employees
- Chapter 749 — Miscellaneous investigation requirements and other duties

=== Part III — Training ===
Part III

- Chapter 751 — Training generally
- Chapter 753 — United States Military Academy
- Chapter 757 — Schools and camps

=== Part IV — Service, Supply, and Procurement ===
Part IV

- Chapter 763 — Procurement
- Chapter 764 — Armaments industrial base
- Chapter 765 — Issue of serviceable material to armed forces
- Chapter 767 — Utilities and services
- Chapter 769 — Sale of serviceable material
- Chapter 771 — Issue of serviceable material other than to armed forces
- Chapter 773 — Disposal of obsolete or surplus material
- Chapter 775 — Disposition of effects of deceased persons; captured flags
- Chapter 776 — Army national military cemeteries
- Chapter 777 — Transportation
- Chapter 779 — Real property
- Chapter 781 — Military claims
- Chapter 783 — Accountability and responsibility

== Subtitle C — Navy and Marine Corps ==
Subtitle C

=== Part I — Organization ===
Part I

- Chapter 801 — Definitions
- Chapter 803 — Department of the Navy
- Chapter 805 — Office of the Chief of Naval Operations
- Chapter 806 — Headquarters, Marine Corps
- Chapter 807 — Composition of the Department of the Navy
- Chapter 809 — Bureaus; Office of the Judge Advocate General

=== Part II — Personnel ===
Part II

- Chapter 811 — Distribution in grade
- Chapter 812 — Grade and rank of officers
- Chapter 813 — Enlistments
- Chapter 815 — Original appointments
- Chapter 821 — Officers in command
- Chapter 823 — Special assignments and details
- Chapter 825 — Administration
- Chapter 827 — Rations
- Chapter 829 — Miscellaneous prohibitions and penalties
- Chapter 831 — Miscellaneous rights and benefits
- Chapter 833 — Hospitalization and medical care
- Chapter 835 — Bands
- Chapter 837 — Decorations and awards
- Chapter 839 — Discharge of enlisted members
- Chapter 841 — Voluntary retirement
- Chapter 843 — Involuntary retirement, separation, and furlough
- Chapter 845 — Recall to active duty
- Chapter 847 — Death benefits; care of the dead

=== Part III — Education and Training ===
Part III

- Chapter 851 — Officer procurement programs
- Chapter 852 — Training generally
- Chapter 853 — United States Naval Academy
- Chapter 855 — United States Naval Postgraduate School
- Chapter 857 — Retirement of civilian members of the teaching staffs of the United States Naval Academy and United States Naval Postgraduate School
- Chapter 859 — Professional military education schools

=== Part IV — General Administration ===
Part IV

- Chapter 861 — Secretary of the Navy: Miscellaneous powers and duties
- Chapter 863 — Naval vessels
- Chapter 865 — Salvage facilities
- Chapter 867 — United States Naval Observatory
- Chapter 869 — Naval petroleum reserves
- Chapter 871 — Civilian employees
- Chapter 873 — Procurement of supplies and services
- Chapter 875 — Disposal of obsolete or surplus material
- Chapter 877 — Quarters, utilities, and services
- Chapter 879 — Ships' stores and commissary stores
- Chapter 881 — Claims
- Chapter 883 — Prize
- Chapter 885 — Stay of judicial proceedings
- Chapter 887 — Naval militia
- Chapter 889 — Accountability and responsibility
- Chapter 891 — Names and insignia
- Chapter 893 — National Oceanographic Partnership Program
- Chapter 895 — Issue of serviceable material other than to armed forces
- Chapter 897 — Maritime safety of forces

== Subtitle D — Air Force and Space Force ==
Subtitle D

=== Part I — Organization ===
Part I

- Chapter 901 — Definitions
- Chapter 903 — Department of the Air Force
- Chapter 905 — The Air Staff
- Chapter 907 — The Air Force
- Chapter 908 — The Space Force

=== Part II — Personnel ===
Part II

- Chapter 911 — Strength
- Chapter 913 — Enlistments
- Chapter 915 — Appointments in the Regular Air Force and the Regular Space Force
- Chapter 919 — Temporary Appointments
- Chapter 921 — Active Duty
- Chapter 923 — Special Appointments, Assignments, Details, and Duties
- Chapter 925 — Rank and Command
- Chapter 929 — Miscellaneous Prohibitions and Penalties
- Chapter 933 — Miscellaneous Rights and Benefits
- Chapter 935 — Hospitalization
- Chapter 937 — Decorations and Awards
- Chapter 939 — Separation for Various Reasons
- Chapter 941 — Retirement for Length of Service
- Chapter 943 — Retired Grade
- Chapter 945 — Computation of Retired Pay
- Chapter 947 — Civilian Employees
- Chapter 949 — Miscellaneous Investigation Requirements and Other Duties

=== Part III — Training ===
Part III

- Chapter 951 — Training Generally
- Chapter 953 — United States Air Force Academy
- Chapter 957 — Schools and Camps
- Chapter 959 — Civil Air Patrol

=== Part IV — Service, Supply, and Procurement ===
Part IV

- Chapter 961 — Civil Reserve Air Fleet
- Chapter 963 — Procurement
- Chapter 965 — Issue of Serviceable Material to Armed Forces
- Chapter 967 — Utilities and Services
- Chapter 969 — Sale of Serviceable Material
- Chapter 971 — Issue of Serviceable Material Other Than to Armed Forces
- Chapter 973 — Disposal of Obsolete or Surplus Material
- Chapter 975 — Disposition of Effects of Deceased Persons
- Chapter 977 — Transportation
- Chapter 979 — Real Property
- Chapter 981 — Military Claims
- Chapter 983 — Accountability and Responsibility

== Subtitle E — Reserve Components ==
Subtitle E

=== Part I — Organization and Administration ===
Part I

- Chapter 1001 — Definitions
- Chapter 1003 — Reserve Components Generally
- Chapter 1005 — Elements of Reserve Components
- Chapter 1006 — Reserve Component Commands
- Chapter 1007 — Administration of Reserve Components
- Chapter 1009 — Reserve Forces Policy Boards and Committees
- Chapter 1011 — National Guard Bureau
- Chapter 1013 — Budget Information and Annual Reports to Congress

=== Part II — Personnel Generally ===
Part II

- Chapter 1201 — Authorized Strengths and Distribution in Grade
- Chapter 1203 — Enlisted Members
- Chapter 1205 — Appointment of Reserve Officers
- Chapter 1207 — Warrant Officers
- Chapter 1209 — Active Duty
- Chapter 1211 — National Guard Members in Federal Service
- Chapter 1213 — Special Appointments, Assignments, Details, and Duties
- Chapter 1214 — Ready Reserve Mobilization Income Insurance
- Chapter 1215 — Miscellaneous Prohibitions and Penalties
- Chapter 1217 — Miscellaneous Rights and Benefits
- Chapter 1219 — Standards and Procedures for Retention and Promotion
- Chapter 1221 — Separation
- Chapter 1223 — Retired Pay for Non-Regular Service
- Chapter 1225 — Retired Grade

=== Part III — Promotion and Retention of Officers on the Reserve Active-Status List ===
Part III

- Chapter 1401 — Applicability and Reserve Active-Status Lists
- Chapter 1403 — Selection Boards
- Chapter 1405 — Promotions
- Chapter 1407 — Failure of Selection for Promotion and Involuntary Separation
- Chapter 1409 — Continuation of Officers on the Reserve Active-Status List and Selective Early Removal
- Chapter 1411 — Additional Provisions Relating to Involuntary Separation

=== Part IV — Training for Reserve Components and Educational Assistance Programs ===
Part IV

- Chapter 1601 — Training Generally
- Chapter 1606 — Educational Assistance for Members of the Selected Reserve
- Chapter 1607 — Educational Assistance for Reserve Component Members Supporting Contingency Operations and Certain Other Operations
- Chapter 1608 — Health Professions Stipend Program
- Chapter 1609 — Education Loan Repayment Programs
- Chapter 1611 — Other Educational Assistance Programs

=== Part V — Service, Supply, and Procurement ===
Part V

- Chapter 1801 — Issue of Serviceable Material to Reserve Components
- Chapter 1803 — Facilities for Reserve Components
- Chapter 1805 — Miscellaneous Provisions

== Subtitle F — Alternative Military Personnel Systems ==
Subtitle F

=== PART I — Space Force ===
Part I

- Chapter 2001 — Space Force Personnel System
- Chapter 2003 — Status and Participation
- Chapter 2005 — Officers
- Chapter 2007 — Enlisted Members
- Chapter 2009 — Retention and Separation Generally
- Chapter 2011 — Separation of Officers for Substandard Performance of Duty or for Certain Other Reasons
- Chapter 2013 — Voluntary Retirement for Length of Service
