= Africa Partnership Station =

Africa Partnership Station (or APS) is an international initiative developed by United States Naval Forces Europe-Africa, which works cooperatively with U.S. and international partners to improve maritime safety and security in Africa as part of US Africa Command's Security Cooperation program. The strategic program is designed to build skills, expertise, and professionalism of African militaries, coast guards, and mariners. APS is not limited to one ship or platform, nor is it delivered only at certain times. The program is delivered in many forms including ship visits, aircraft visits, training teams, and Seabee construction projects throughout most of the year. APS is part of a long-term commitment on the part of all participating nations and organizations from Africa, the United States, Europe, and South America.

APS activities consist of joint exercises, port visits, hands-on practical courses, professional training and community outreach with the coastal nations of Africa. The focus is on building maritime capacity of the nations and increasing the level of cooperation between them to improve maritime safety and security. The goal is to improve the ability of the nations involved to extend the rule of law within their territorial waters and exclusive economic zones and better combat illegal fishing, human smuggling, drug trafficking, oil theft and piracy. APS also works to increase maritime safety by teaching skills that enhance a nation's ability to respond to mariners in distress.

The first APS deployment was from November 2007 to April 2008. Countries visited included Senegal, Togo, Ghana, São Tomé and Príncipe, Cameroon, Liberia, Gabon, and Equatorial Guinea and included USS Fort McHenry (LSD-43) and HSV Swift, with an international staff embarked in Fort McHenry. The time in between major deployments was covered by mobile training team visits, maritime patrol aircraft exercises and port visits by individual naval vessels.

During the summer and fall of 2008 two ships began what was at the time called a LEDET, or Law Enforcement Detachment. These ships were US Coast Guard Cutter Dallas (USCGC Dallas (WHEC-716)) and USS Leyte Gulf (CG-55). These missions were designed to bring African law enforcement officials onboard US ships, in concert with Coast Guard personnel, in order to conduct the first real-time operations, building upon the many skills and capabilities acquired on previous training visits.

USS Nashville (LPD-13) was the second large amphibious ship to deploy to Africa under Africa Partnership Station; it deployed from February 2009 to May 2009. The Nashville was the largest ship to perform the APS mission in 2009. APS Nashville visited Senegal, Ghana, Gabon, Cameroon, and Nigeria, spending one to two weeks in each port. APS Nashville's embarked staff had a larger international flavor with military members from Nigeria, Cameroon, Senegal, Ghana, Gabon, Italy, Portugal, Cape Verde, Sierra Leone, Togo, Equatorial Guinea, Kenya, UK, France, Germany, Spain, Denmark, Malta and Brazil.

In February 2009 APS expanded to South and East Africa when the USS Robert G. Bradley (FFG-49) visited Mozambique, Tanzania and Kenya.

Over the summer of 2009 (after USS Nashville completed her APS mission) other ships continued the initiative. USS Arleigh Burke (DDG-51) visited East Africa, bringing APS once again to the East coast of Africa and expanding the range of cooperative training. At the same time HSV Swift and the US Coast Guard Cutter Legare (USCGC Legare) continued the APS mission in West and Central Africa. While APS Swift conducted a series of training, humanitarian and outreach missions in the west, Legare led and participated in the first African Maritime Law Enforcement Partnership or AMLEP (the name used to replace the LEDETs mentioned above). While on the mission with members of the Sierra Leone Maritime Wing APS Legare made a significant impact when the joint mission boarded a Taiwanese vessel illegally fishing with thousands of dollars of fish. More recently (April 2015), the USNS Spearhead and its embarked detachment of U.S. Navy Sailors, civil service mariners and U.S., Spanish and British Marines conducted a portion of Spearhead’s support to Africa Partnership Station while in Port Gentil, Gabon.

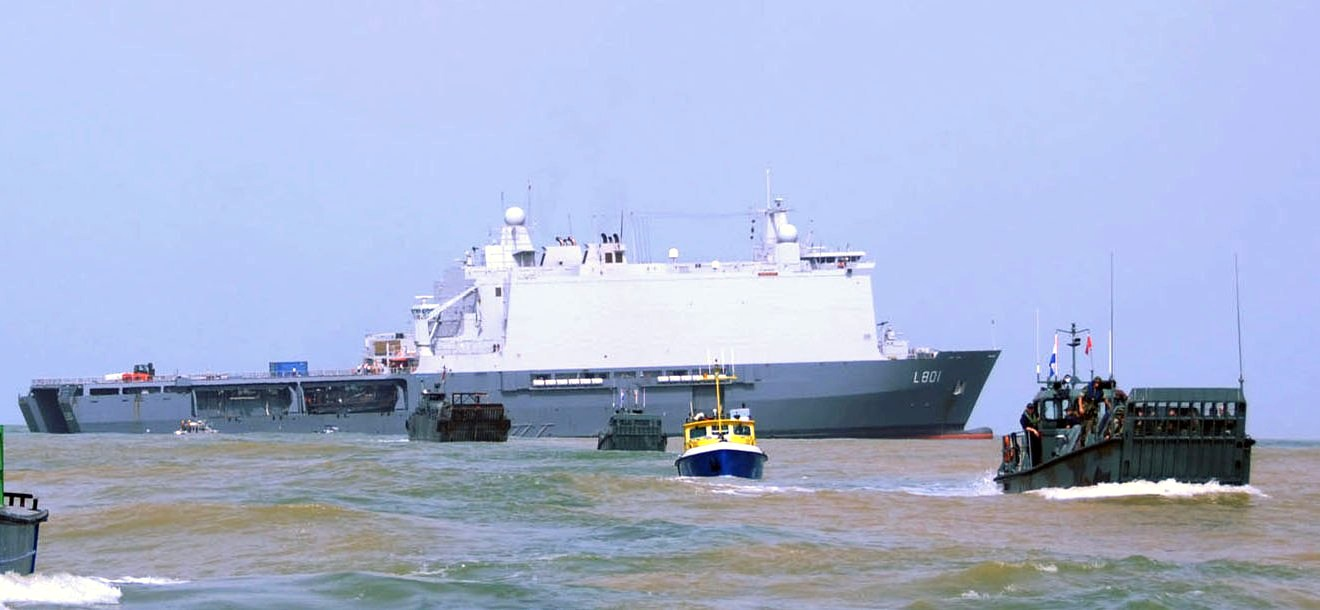
HNLMS Johan De Witt on location

In the Fall of 2009 the first APS mission led by a non-US country commenced when the Dutch Rotterdam class amphibious transport dock Johan De Witt conducted the mission with US, Portuguese and Belgian Sailors and Marines embarked as training teams, and with Seabees and other subject matter experts. The ship conducted port visits to Senegal, Liberia, Sierra Leone and Ghana.

In winter and spring of 2010 APS again made banner deployments. This time USS Gunston Hall (LSD-44) visited West and Central Africa and a 2-ship flotilla will visit East Africa at virtually the same time. The East Africa mission will include USS Nicholas (FFG-47) and HSV Swift.

In May 2018, the U.S. Department of Transportation Volpe Center identified SeaVision as one of the main tools used with United States Naval Forces Europe-Africa when conducting four maritime domain awareness exercises each year
