= Office of Global Maritime Situational Awareness =

United States interagency office

The Office of Global Maritime Situational Awareness (OGMSA) is a United States interagency office tasked with achieving maritime domain awareness and developing policies related to disclosing this information to other areas of the U.S. government.

The OGMSA was formed as part of the National Plan to Achieve Maritime Security in October 2005.

== Major Initiatives ==
- Global Maritime Information Sharing Symposium (GMISS)
- Maritime Safety and Security Information System (MSSIS)
- Maritime Domain Awareness Enterprise Hubs
- Interagency Investment Strategy Monitoring, Reporting and Coordination
