= Hazard =

Situation or object that can cause harm

A hazard pictogram to indicate a hazard from a flammable substance.

A hazard is a potential source of harm. Substances, events, or circumstances can constitute hazards when their nature would potentially allow them to cause damage to health, life, property, or any other interest of value. The probability of that harm being realized in a specific incident, combined with the magnitude of potential harm, make up its risk. This term is often used synonymously in colloquial speech.

Hazards can be classified in several ways which are not mutually exclusive. They can be classified by causing actor (for example, natural or anthropogenic), by physical nature (e.g. biological or chemical) or by type of damage (e.g., health hazard or environmental hazard). Examples of natural disasters with highly harmful impacts on a society are floods, droughts, earthquakes, tropical cyclones, lightning strikes, volcanic activity and wildfires. Technological and anthropogenic hazards include, for example, structural collapses, transport accidents, accidental or intentional explosions, and release of toxic materials.

The term climate hazard is used in the context of climate change. These are hazards that stem from climate-related events and can be associated with global warming, such as wildfires, floods, droughts, sea level rise. Climate hazards can combine with other hazards and result in compound event losses (see also loss and damage). For example, the climate hazard of heat can combine with the hazard of poor air quality. Or the climate hazard flooding can combine with poor water quality.

In physics terms, common theme across many forms of hazards is the presence of energy that can cause damage, as it can happen with chemical energy, mechanical energy or thermal energy. This damage can affect different valuable interests, and the severity of the associated risk varies.

== Definition ==
A hazard is defined as "the potential occurrence of a natural or human-induced physical event or trend that may cause loss of life, injury, or other health impacts, as well as damage and loss to property, infrastructure, livelihoods, service provision, ecosystems and environmental resources."

A hazard only exists if there is a pathway to exposure. For example, the center of the Earth consists of molten material at very high temperatures, which would be a severe hazard if contact could be made with the core. However, since that is not feasible, the Earth's core currently poses no hazard.

The frequency and severity of hazards are important aspects for risk management. Hazards may also be assessed in relation to the impact that they have.

In defining hazard Keith Smith argues that what may be defined as the hazard is only a hazard if there is the presence of humans to make it a hazard. In this regard, human sensitivity to environmental hazards is a combination of both physical exposure (natural and/or technological events at a location related to their statistical variability) and human vulnerability (about social and economic tolerance of the same location).

== Relationship with other terms ==
=== Disaster ===
An example of the distinction between a natural hazard and a disaster is that an earthquake is the hazard which caused the 1906 San Francisco earthquake disaster.

A natural disaster is the highly harmful impact on a society or community following a natural hazard event. The term "disaster" itself is defined as follows: "Disasters are serious disruptions to the functioning of a community that exceed its capacity to cope using its own resources. Disasters can be caused by natural, man-made and technological hazards, as well as various factors that influence the exposure and vulnerability of a community."

The US Federal Emergency Management Agency (FEMA) explains the relationship between natural disasters and natural hazards as follows: "Natural hazards and natural disasters are related but are not the same. A natural hazard is the threat of an event that will likely have a negative impact. A natural disaster is the negative impact following an actual occurrence of natural hazard in the event that it significantly harms a community.

Disaster can take various forms, including hurricane, volcano, tsunami, earthquake, drought, famine, plague, disease, rail crash, car crash, tornado, deforestation, flooding, toxic release, and spills (oil, chemicals).

A disaster hazard is an extreme geophysical event that is capable of causing a disaster. 'Extreme' in this case means a substantial variation in either the positive or the negative direction from the normal trend; flood disasters can result from exceptionally high precipitation and river discharge, and drought is caused by exceptionally low values. The fundamental determinants of hazard and the risk of such hazards occurring is timing, location, magnitude and frequency. For example, magnitudes of earthquakes are measured on the Richter scale from 1 to 10, whereby each increment of 1 indicates a tenfold increase in severity. The magnitude-frequency rule states that over a significant period of time many small events and a few large ones will occur. Hurricanes and typhoons on the other hand occur between 5 degrees and 25 degrees north and south of the equator, tending to be seasonal phenomena that are thus largely recurrent in time and predictable in location due to the specific climate variables necessary for their formation.

=== Risk and vulnerability ===
The terms hazard and risk are often used interchangeably. However, in terms of risk assessment, these are two very distinct terms. A hazard is an agent that can cause harm or damage to humans, property, or the environment. Risk is the probability that exposure to a hazard will lead to a negative consequence, or more simply, a hazard poses no risk if there is no exposure to that hazard.

Risk is a combination of hazard, exposure and vulnerability. For example in terms of water security: examples of hazards are droughts, floods and decline in water quality. Bad infrastructure and bad governance lead to high exposure to risk.

Risk can be defined as the likelihood or probability of a given hazard of a given level causing a particular level of loss of damage. The elements of risk are populations, communities, the built environment, the natural environment, economic activities and services which are under threat of disaster in a given area.

Another definition of risk is "the probable frequency and probable magnitude of future losses". This definition also focuses on the probability of future loss whereby the degree of vulnerability to hazard represents the level of risk on a particular population or environment. The threats posed by a hazard are:

1. Hazards to people – death, injury, disease and stress
2. Hazards to goods – property damage and economic loss
3. Hazards to environment –loss of flora and fauna, pollution and loss of amenity

== Classifications ==
Hazards can be classified in several ways. These categories are not mutually exclusive which means that one hazard can fall into several categories. For example, water pollution with toxic chemicals is an anthropogenic hazard as well as an environmental hazard.

One of the classification methods is by specifying the origin of the hazard. One key concept in identifying a hazard is the presence of stored energy that, when released, can cause damage. The stored energy can occur in many forms: chemical, mechanical, thermal, radioactive, electrical, etc.

The United Nations Office for Disaster Risk Reduction (UNDRR) explains that "each hazard is characterized by its location, intensity or magnitude, frequency and probability".

A distinction can also be made between rapid-onset natural hazards, technological hazards, and social hazards, which are described as being of sudden occurrence and relatively short duration, and the consequences of longer-term environmental degradation such as desertification and drought.

Hazards may be grouped according to their characteristics. These factors are related to geophysical events, which are not process specific:

1. Areal extent of damage zone
2. Intensity of impact at a point
3. Duration of impact at a point
4. Rate of onset of the event
5. Predictability of the event

== By causing actor ==
=== Natural hazard ===
Damage to valuable human interests can occur due to phenomena and processes of the natural environment. Natural disasters such as earthquakes, floods, volcanoes and tsunami have threatened people, society, the natural environment, and the built environment, particularly more vulnerable people, throughout history, and in some cases, on a day-to-day basis. According to the Red Cross, each year 130,000 people are killed, 90,000 are injured and 140 million are affected by unique events known as natural disasters.

Potentially dangerous phenomena which are natural or predominantly natural (for example, exceptions are intentional floods) can be classified in these categories:

- Meteorological and hydrological hazards, e.g. lightning, storm, flood, sandstorm, fog, rogue wave, tsunami, snow, limnic eruption, cold wave, heat wave
- Geological hazards
  - Earthquake
  - Volcanism, which can cause a wide range of events, such as lava flow and ash fall
  - Surface or near-surface events, especially erosion and mass wasting (e.g. landslide)
- Extraterrestrial hazards, e.g. solar storm, impact event

Natural hazards can be influenced by human actions in different ways and to varying degrees, e.g. land-use change, drainage and construction. Humans play a central role in the existence of natural hazards because "it is only when people and their possessions get in the way of natural processes that hazard exists".

A natural hazard can be considered as a geophysical event when it occurs in extremes and a human factor is involved that may present a risk. There may be an acceptable variation of magnitude which can vary from the estimated normal or average range with upper and lower limits or thresholds. In these extremes, the natural occurrence may become an event that presents a risk to the environment or people. For example, above-average wind speeds resulting in a tropical depression or hurricane according to intensity measures on the Saffir–Simpson scale will provide an extreme natural event that may be considered a hazard.

==== Seismic hazard ====
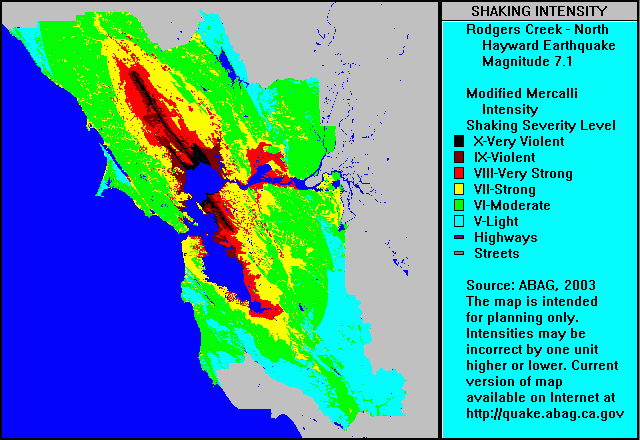
Surface motion map for a hypothetical earthquake on the northern portion of the Hayward Fault Zone and its presumed northern extension, the Rodgers Creek Fault Zone

A seismic hazard is the probability that an earthquake will occur in a given geographic area, within a given window of time, and with ground motion intensity exceeding a given threshold. With a hazard thus estimated, seismic risk can be assessed and included in such areas as building codes for standard buildings, designing larger buildings and infrastructure projects, land use planning and determining insurance rates.

Tsunamis can be caused by geophysical hazards, such as in the 2004 Indian Ocean earthquake and tsunami. The earthquake caused a massive tsunami with waves up to 30 m (100 ft) high, referred to by British and Commonwealth media as the Boxing Day tsunami, after the Boxing Day holiday, or the Asian tsunami, which devastated communities along the surrounding coasts of the Indian Ocean, killing an estimated 227,898 people in 14 countries, especially in Aceh in Indonesia, Sri Lanka, Tamil Nadu in India, and Khao Lak in Thailand.

Although generally a natural phenomenon, earthquakes can sometimes be induced by human interventions, such as injection wells, large underground nuclear explosions, excavation of mines, or reservoirs.

==== Volcanic hazard ====
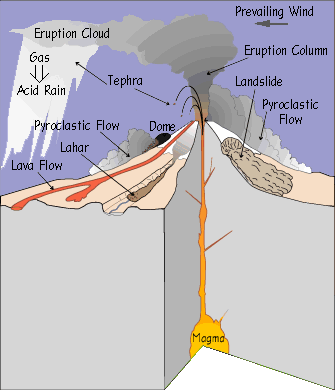
A schematic diagram shows some of the many ways volcanoes can cause problems for those nearby.

A volcanic hazard is the probability a volcanic eruption or related geophysical event will occur in a given geographic area and within a specified window of time. The risk that can be associated with a volcanic hazard depends on the proximity and vulnerability of an asset or a population of people near to where a volcanic event might occur.

=== Anthropogenic hazard ===
Anthropogenic hazards, or human-induced hazards, are "induced entirely or predominantly by human activities and choices". These can be societal, technological or environmental hazards.

==== Technological hazard ====
Technological hazards are created by the possibility of failure associated with human technology (including emerging technologies), which can also impact the economy, health and national security.

For example, technological hazards can arise from the following events:

- Transport accidents: traffic collisions, navigation accidents, rail accidents, aviation accidents
- Nuclear materials-related accidents: nuclear plant accidents, nuclear weapon accidents and other nuclear accidents
- Chemical accidents and accidental explosions
- Mining accidents
- Space accidents
- Technological failures (including those that affect information and communications technology, such as cybersecurity threats) can cause disruptions to the energy industry (e.g. power outages), telecommunications (e.g. Internet outage), healthcare, banking, transportation, food supply, water supply and other important services.
- Structural failures or construction accidents

A mechanical hazard is any hazard involving a machine or industrial process. Motor vehicles, aircraft, and air bags pose mechanical hazards. Compressed gases or liquids can also be considered a mechanical hazard. Hazard identification of new machines and/or industrial processes occurs at various stages in the design of the new machine or process. These hazard identification studies focus mainly on deviations from the intended use or design and the harm that may occur as a result of these deviations. These studies are regulated by various agencies such as the Occupational Safety and Health Administration and the National Highway Traffic Safety Administration.

Engineering hazards occur when human structures fail (e.g. building or structural collapse, bridge failures, dam failures) or the materials used in their construction prove to be hazardous.

==== Societal hazard ====
Societal hazards can arise from civil disorders, explosive remnants of war, violence, crowd accidents, financial crises, etc. However, the United Nations Office for Disaster Risk Reduction (UNDRR) Hazard Definition & Classification Review (Sendai Framework 2015 - 2030) specifically excludes armed conflict from the anthropogenic hazard category, as these hazards are already recognised under international humanitarian law.

==== Waste disposal ====
In managing waste many hazardous materials are put in the domestic and commercial waste stream. In part this is because modern technological living uses certain toxic or poisonous materials in the electronics and chemical industries. Which, when they are in use or transported, are usually safely contained or encapsulated and packaged to avoid any exposure. In the waste stream, the waste products exterior or encapsulation breaks or degrades and there is a release and exposure to hazardous materials into the environment, for people working in the waste disposal industry, those living around sites used for waste disposal or landfill and the general environment surrounding such sites.

=== Socionatural hazard ===
There are different ways to group hazards by origin. The definition by UNDRR states: "Hazards may be natural, anthropogenic or socionatural in origin." The socionatural hazards are those that are "associated with a combination of natural and anthropogenic factors, including environmental degradation and climate change".

==== Climate hazard ====
The term climate hazard or climatic hazard is used in the context of climate change, for example in the IPCC Sixth Assessment Report. These are hazards that stem from climate-related events such as wildfires, floods, droughts, sea level rise.

Climate hazards in the context of water include: Increased temperatures, changes in rainfall patterns between the wet and dry season (increased rainfall variability) and sea level rise. The reason why increasing temperatures is listed here as a climate hazard is because "warming temperatures may result in higher evapotranspiration, in turn leading to drier soils".

Waterborne diseases are also connected to climate hazards.

Climate hazards can combine with other hazards and result in compound event losses (see also loss and damage). For example, the climate hazard of heat can combine with the hazard of poor air quality. Or the climate hazard flooding can combine with poor water quality.

Climate scientists have pointed out that climate hazards affect different groups of people differently, depending on their climate change vulnerability: There are "factors that make people and groups vulnerable (e.g., poverty, uneven power structures, disadvantage and discrimination due to, for example, social location and the intersectionality or the overlapping and compounding risks from ethnicity or racial discrimination, gender, age, or disability, etc.)".

== By physical nature ==
=== Biological hazard ===
Biological hazards, also known as biohazards, originate in biological processes of living organisms and pose threats to the health of humans, the security of property, or the environment.

Biological hazards include pathogenic microorganisms, such as viruses and bacteria, epidemics, pandemics, parasites, pests, animal attacks, venomous animals, biological toxins and foodborne illnesses.

For example, naturally occurring bacteria such as Escherichia coli and Salmonella are well known pathogens, and a variety of measures have been taken to limit human exposure to these microorganisms through food safety, good personal hygiene, and education. The potential for new biological hazards also exists through the discovery of new microorganisms and the development of new genetically modified (GM) organisms. The use of new GM organisms is regulated by various governmental agencies. The US Environmental Protection Agency (EPA) controls GM plants that produce or resist pesticides (i.e. Bt corn and Roundup ready crops). The US Food and Drug Administration (FDA) regulates GM plants that will be used as food or for medicinal purposes.

Biological hazards can include medical waste or samples of a microorganism, virus or toxin (from a biological source) that can affect health. Many biological hazards are associated with food, including certain viruses, parasites, fungi, bacteria, and plant and seafood toxins. Pathogenic Campylobacter and Salmonella are common foodborne biological hazards. The hazards from these bacteria can be avoided through risk mitigation steps such as proper handling, storing, and cooking of food. Diseases can be enhanced by human factors such as poor sanitation or by processes such as urbanization.

=== Chemical hazard ===
A chemical can be considered a hazardous material if by its intrinsic properties it can cause harm or danger to humans, property, or the environment. Health hazards associated with chemicals are dependent on the dose or amount of exposure to the chemical. For example, iodine in the form of potassium iodate is used to produce iodised salt. When applied at a rate of 20 mg of potassium iodate per 1000 mg of table salt, the chemical is beneficial in preventing goitre, while iodine intakes of 1200–9500 mg in one dose has been known to cause death. Some chemicals have a cumulative biological effect, while others are metabolically eliminated over time. Other chemical hazards may depend on concentration or cumulative quantity for their effects.

Some harmful chemicals occur naturally in certain geological formations, such as arsenic. Other chemicals include products with commercial uses, such as agricultural and industrial chemicals, as well as products developed for home use.

A variety of chemical hazards have been identified. However, every year companies produce more new chemicals to fill new needs or to take the place of older, less effective chemicals. Laws, such as the Federal Food, Drug, and Cosmetic Act and the Toxic Substances Control Act in the US, require protection of human health and the environment for any new chemical introduced. In the US, the EPA regulates new chemicals that may have environmental impacts (i.e., pesticides or chemicals released during a manufacturing process), while the FDA regulates new chemicals used in foods or as drugs. The potential hazards of these chemicals can be identified by performing a variety of tests before the authorization of usage. The number of tests required and the extent to which the chemicals are tested varies, depending on the desired usage of the chemical. Chemicals designed as new drugs must undergo more rigorous tests than those used as pesticides.

Pesticides, which are normally used to control unwanted insects and plants, may cause a variety of negative effects on non-target organisms. DDT can build up, or bioaccumulate, in birds, resulting in thinner-than-normal eggshells, which can break in the nest. The organochlorine pesticide dieldrin has been linked to Parkinson's disease. Corrosive chemicals like sulfuric acid, which is found in car batteries and research laboratories, can cause severe skin burns. Many other chemicals used in industrial and laboratory settings can cause respiratory, digestive, or nervous system problems if they are inhaled, ingested, or absorbed through the skin. The negative effects of other chemicals, such as alcohol and nicotine, have been well documented.

Organohalogens are a family of synthetic organic molecules which all contain atoms of one of the halogens. Such materials include PCBs, dioxins, DDT, Freon and many others. Although considered harmless when first produced, many of these compounds are now known to have profound physiological effects on many organisms including man. Many are also fat soluble and become concentrated through the food chain.

=== Radioactive or electromagnetic hazard ===
Radioactive materials produce ionizing radiation which may be very harmful to living organisms. Damage from even a short exposure to radioactivity may have long-term adverse health consequences.

=== Thermal or fire hazard ===
==== Fire hazard ====
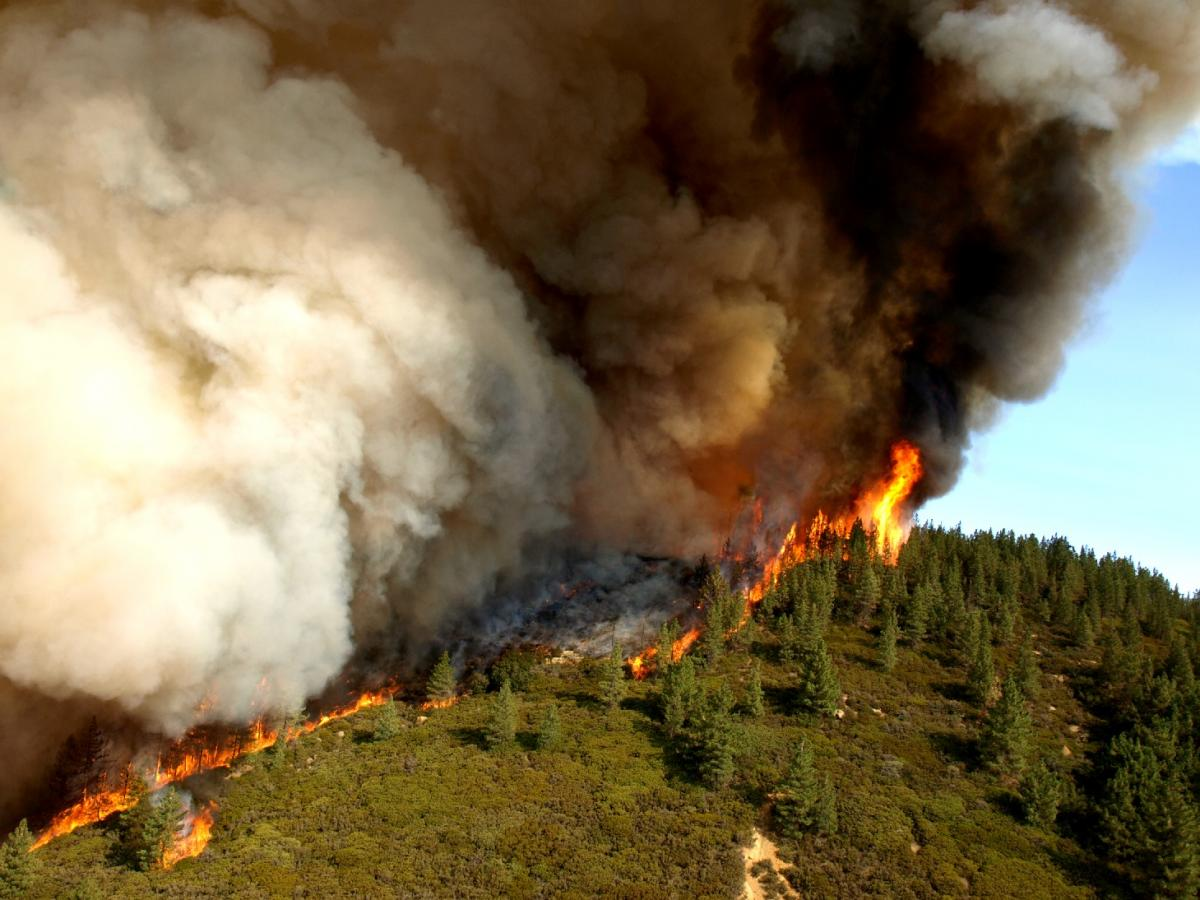
An active flame front of the Zaca Fire

Threats to fire safety are commonly referred to as fire hazards. A fire hazard may include a situation that increases the likelihood of a fire or may impede escape in the event a fire occurs.

Casualties resulting from fires, regardless of their source or initial cause, can be aggravated by inadequate emergency preparedness. Such hazards as a lack of accessible emergency exits, poorly marked escape routes, or improperly maintained fire extinguishers or sprinkler systems may result in many more deaths and injuries than might occur with such protections.

=== Kinetic hazard ===
Kinetic energy is involved in hazards associated with noise, falling, or vibration.

== By type of damage ==
=== Health hazard ===
GHS hazard pictograms for health hazards.

Hazards that would affect the health of exposed persons, usually having an acute or chronic illness as the consequence. Fatality would not normally be an immediate consequence. Health hazards may cause measurable changes in the body which are generally indicated by the development of signs and symptoms in the exposed persons, or non-measurable, subjective symptoms.

==== Ergonomic hazard ====
Ergonomic hazards are physical conditions that may pose a risk of injury to the musculoskeletal system, such as the muscles or ligaments of the lower back, tendons or nerves of the hands/wrists, or bones surrounding the knees. Ergonomic hazards include things such as awkward or extreme postures, whole-body or hand/arm vibration, poorly designed tools, equipment, or workstations, repetitive motion, and poor lighting. Ergonomic hazards occur in both occupational and non-occupational settings such as in workshops, building sites, offices, home, school, or public spaces and facilities.

==== Occupational hazard ====
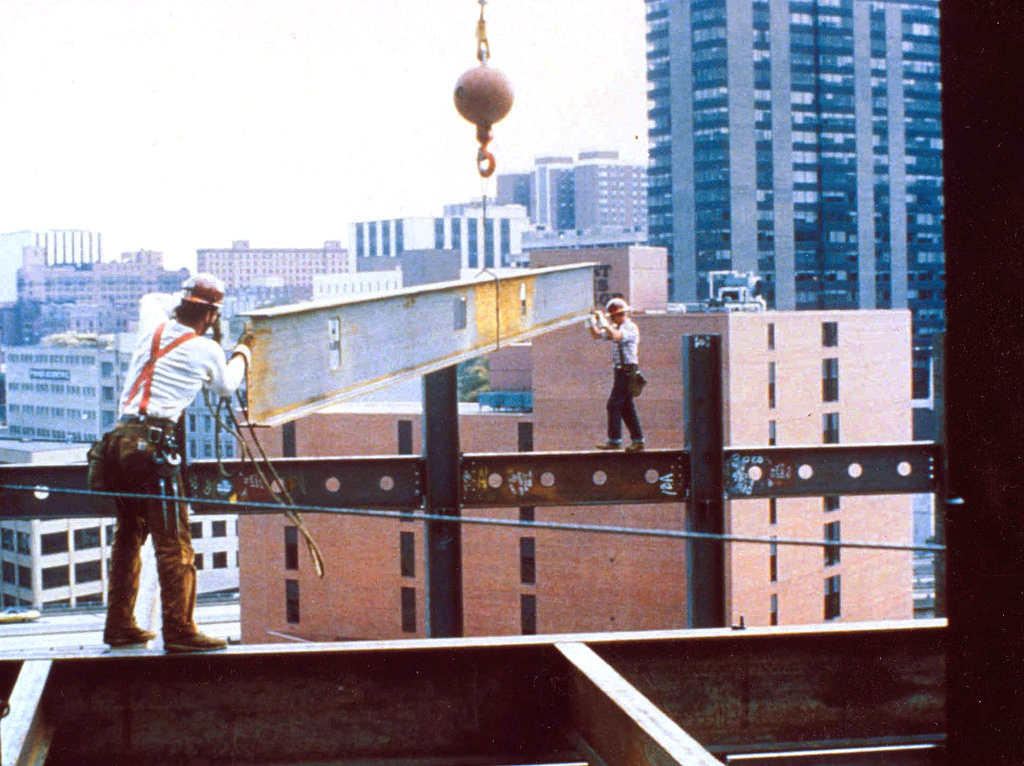
Construction workers at height without appropriate safety equipment

An occupational hazard is a hazard experienced in the workplace. This encompasses many types of hazards, including chemical hazards, biological hazards (biohazards), psychosocial hazards, and physical hazards. In the United States, the National Institute for Occupational Safety and Health (NIOSH) conduct workplace investigations and research addressing workplace health and safety hazards resulting in guidelines. The Occupational Safety and Health Administration (OSHA) establishes enforceable standards to prevent workplace injuries and illnesses. In the EU, a similar role is taken by EU-OSHA.

==== Psychosocial hazard ====
Psychological or psychosocial hazards are hazards that affect the psychological well-being of people, including their ability to participate in a work environment among other people. Psychosocial hazards are related to the way work is designed, organized, and managed, as well as the economic and social contexts of work, and are associated with psychiatric, psychological, and/or physical injury or illness. Linked to psychosocial risks are issues such as occupational stress and workplace violence, which are recognized internationally as major challenges to occupational health and safety.

=== Environmental hazard ===
The international pictogram for environmentally hazardous materials.

An environmental hazard is something which is hazardous, either to the natural environment or of the natural environment and which is normally present in the specific environment and is dangerous to people present in that environment.

Well-known examples of hazards to the environment include potential oil spills, water pollution, slash and burn deforestation, air pollution, ground fissures, and build-up of atmospheric carbon dioxide. They may apply to a particular part of the environment (slash and burn deforestation) or to the environment as a whole (carbon dioxide buildup in the atmosphere)..

Similarly, a hazard of an environment may be inherent in the whole of that environment, like a drowning hazard is inherent to the general underwater environment, or localised, like potential shark attack is a hazard of those parts of the ocean where sharks that are likely to attack people are likely to exist.

An active volcano may be a hazard to the environment, whether natural or artificial, and at the same time a hazard in and of the environment.

=== Property ===
==== Cultural property ====
Cultural property can be damaged, lost or destroyed by different events or processes, including war, vandalism, theft, looting, transport accident, water leak, human error, natural disaster, fire, pests, pollution and progressive deterioration.

== By status ==
Hazards are sometimes classified into three modes or statuses:

- Dormant—The situation environment is currently affected. For instance, a hillside may be unstable, with the potential for a landslide, but there is nothing below or on the hillside that could be affected.
- Armed—People, property, or environment are in potential harm's way.
- Active—A harmful incident involving the hazard has actually occurred. Often this is referred to not as an "active hazard" but as an accident, emergency, incident, or disaster.

== Analysis and management ==
Hierarchy of hazard controls: Those hazard control methods at the top of the graphic are potentially more effective and protective than those at the bottom. Following this hierarchy of controls normally leads to the implementation of inherently safer systems, where the risk of illness or injury has been substantially reduced.

A range of methodologies are used to assess hazards and to manage them:

- Hazard analysis – Method for assessing risk
- Hazard analysis and critical control points – Systematic preventive approach to food safety (HACCP)
- Hazard and operability study – Study of risks in a plan or operation (HAZOP)
- Hierarchy of hazard controls – System used in industry to eliminate or minimize exposure to hazards

=== Hazard symbol ===
Skull and crossbones, a common symbol for poison and other sources of lethal danger (GHS hazard pictograms)

Hazard symbols are universally recognized symbols designed to alert individuals to the presence of hazardous or dangerous materials, locations, or conditions. These include risks associated with electromagnetic fields, electric currents, toxic chemicals, explosive substances, and radioactive materials. Their design and use are often governed by laws and standards organizations to ensure clarity and consistency. Hazard symbols may vary in color, background, borders, or accompanying text to indicate specific dangers and levels of risk, such as toxicity classes. These symbols provide a quick, universally understandable visual warning that transcends language barriers, making them more effective than text-based warnings in many situations.

== See also ==
- Moral hazard – Increases in the exposure to risk when insured, or when another bears the cost
