= Disaster =

Event resulting in major damage, destruction or death

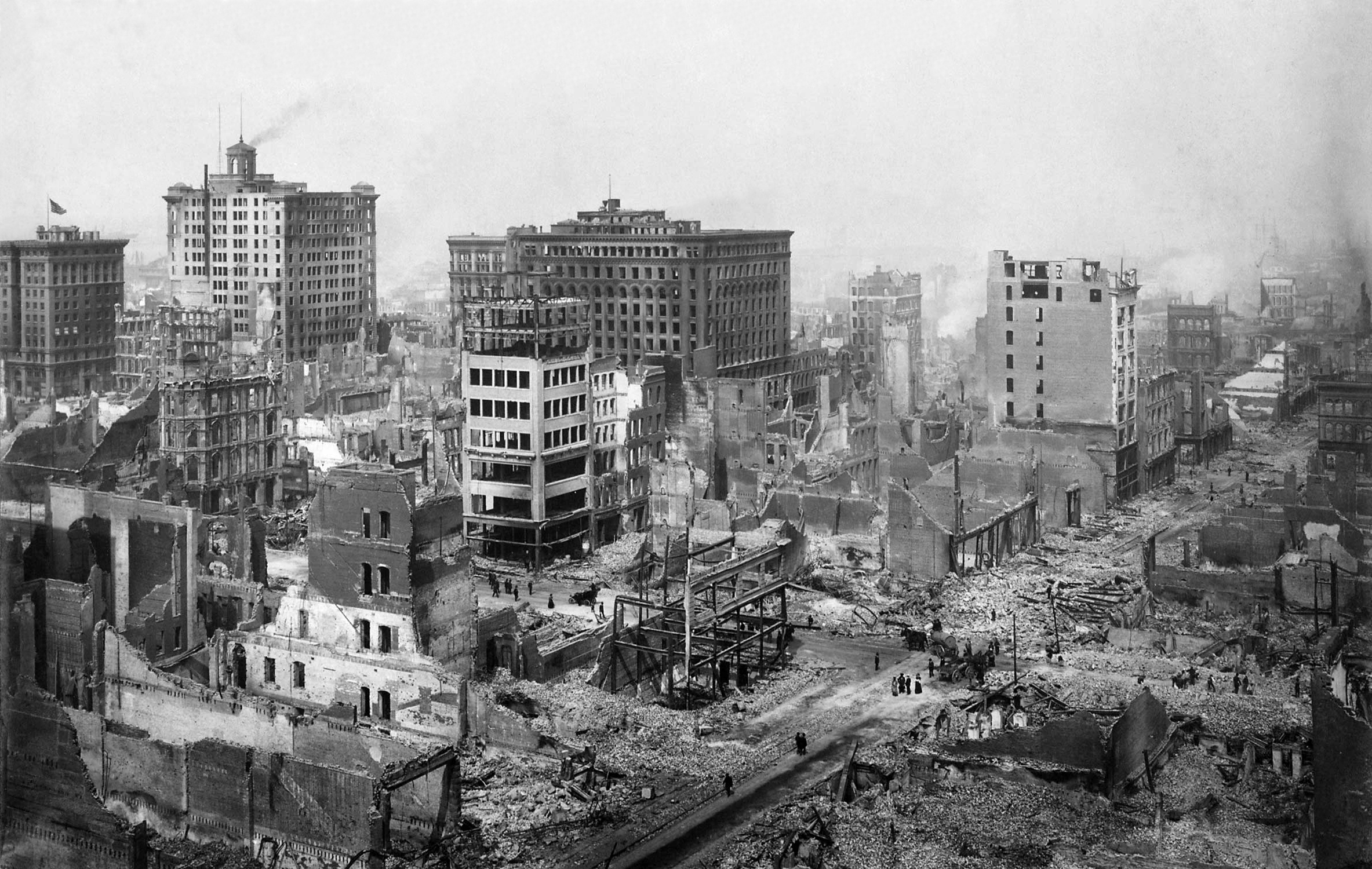
Ruins from the 1906 San Francisco earthquake, one of the worst disasters in the history of the United States

A disaster is an event that causes such serious harm to people, buildings, economies, or the environment that the affected community cannot manage without external assistance or relief. The United Nations Office for Disaster Risk Reduction defines a disaster as "a serious disruption of the functioning of a community or a society at any scale due to hazardous events interacting with conditions of exposure, vulnerability and capacity, leading to one or more of the following: human, material, economic and environmental losses and impacts". Natural disasters like avalanches, floods, earthquakes, and wildfires are caused by natural hazards. Human-made disasters like oil spills, terrorist attacks and power outages are caused by people. It may be difficult to separate natural and human-made disasters because human actions can make natural disasters worse. Climate change also affects how often disasters due to extreme weather hazards happen.

Disasters usually affect people in developing countries more than people in wealthy countries. Over 95% of deaths from disasters happen in low-income countries, and those countries have higher economic losses compared to higher-income countries. For example, the damage from natural disasters is 20 times greater in developing countries than in industrialized countries. This is because low-income countries often do not have well-built buildings or good plans to handle emergencies.

To reduce the damage from disasters, it is important to be prepared and have fit-for-purpose infrastructure. Disaster risk reduction (DRR) aims to make communities stronger and better prepared to handle disasters. It focuses on actions to reduce risk before a disaster occurs, rather than on response and recovery after the event. DRR and climate change adaptation measures are similar in that they aim to reduce vulnerability of people and places to natural hazards.

When a disaster happens, the response includes actions like warning and evacuating people, rescuing those in danger, and quickly providing food, shelter, and medical care. The goal is to save lives and help people recover as quickly as possible. In some cases, national or international help may be needed to support recovery. This can happen, for example, through the work of humanitarian organizations.

== Definitions ==
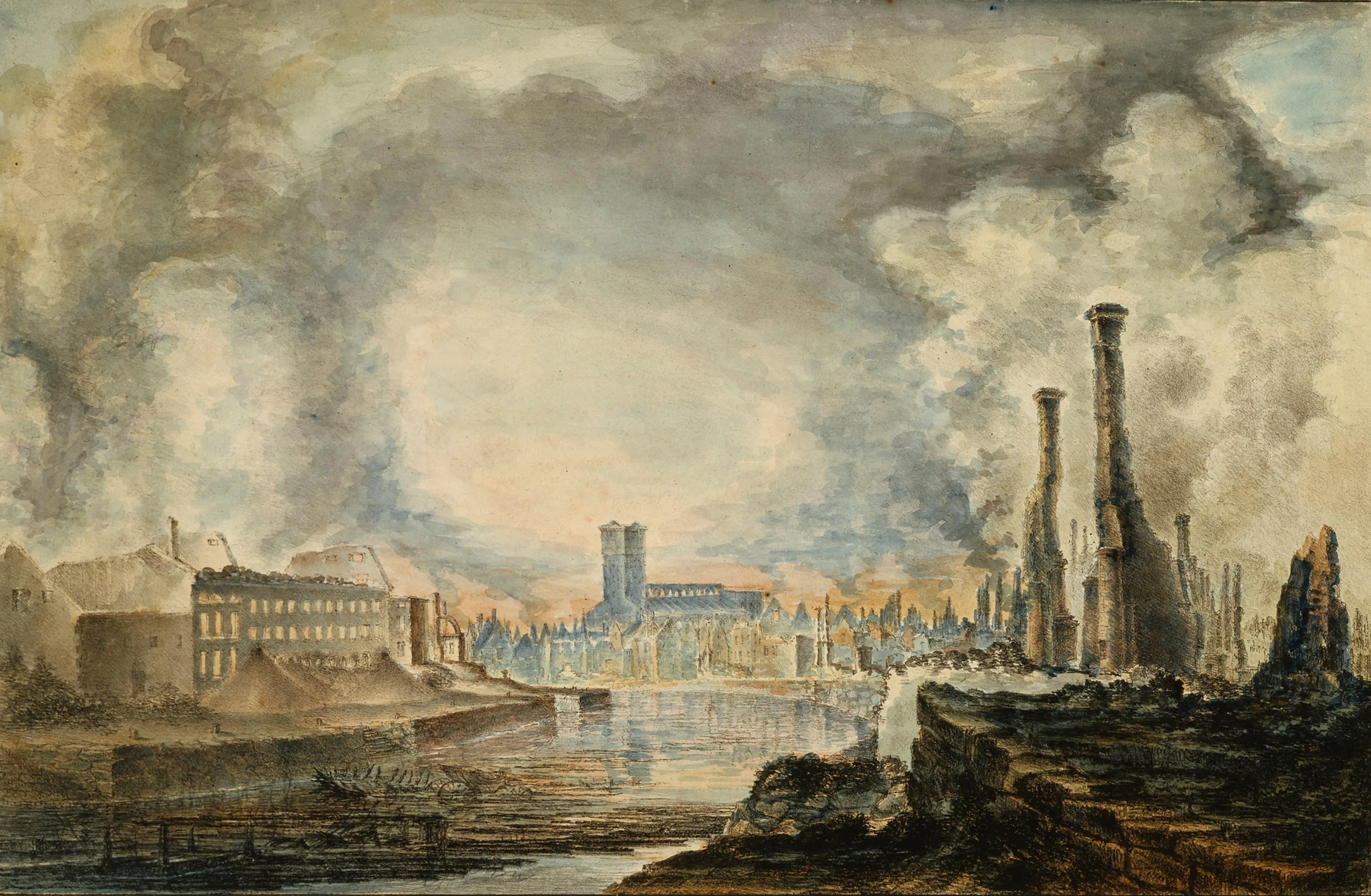
Painting of the Turku Cathedral and the Academy of Turku after the Great Fire of Turku, by Gustaf Wilhelm Finnberg (1827)

The United Nations defines a disaster as "a serious disruption of the functioning of a community or a society at any scale". Disasters result from hazards occurring in areas where people live under exposed or vulnerable conditions. Human factors such as inadequate planning, poor development practices, and lack of preparedness can increase community vulnerability to climate hazards.

Disasters are defined as events that have significant adverse effects on people. When a hazard overwhelms the capacity of a community to respond or causes widespread injury or damage, it is classified as a disaster. The international disaster database EM-DAT defines a disaster as “a situation or event that overwhelms local capacity, necessitating a request for external assistance at the national or international level; it is an unforeseen and often sudden event that causes great damage, destruction, and human suffering.”

The effects of a disaster encompass human, material, economic, and environmental losses and effects.

UNDRO (1984) defined a disaster in a more qualitative fashion as "an event, concentrated in time and space, in which a community undergoes severe danger and incurs such losses to its members and physical appurtenances that the social structure is disrupted and the fulfilment of all or some of the essential functions of the society is prevented." Like other definitions, this looks beyond the social aspects of the disaster impacts. It also focuses on losses. This raises the need for emergency response as an aspect of the disaster. It does not set out quantitative thresholds or scales for damage, death, or injury.

A study in 1969 defined major disasters as conforming to the following criteria, based on the number of deaths or amount of damage: at least 100 people dead, at least 100 people injured, or at least $1 million damage. This definition includes indirect losses of life caused after the initial onset of the disaster. These could be the effects of diseases such as cholera or dysentery arising from the disaster. This definition is still commonly used. However, it is limited to the number of deaths, injuries, and damage in money terms.

== Types ==
The scale of a disaster matters. Small-scale disasters only affect local communities but need help beyond the affected community. Large-scale disasters affect wider society and need national or international help.

Sendai Framework for Disaster Risk Reduction (2015–2030)

- For the purposes of defining the scope of the Sendai Framework for Disaster Risk Reduction (2015–2030), the following concepts are understood as follows:
  - Small-scale disasters refer to events that primarily impact local communities and exceed the capacity of those communities to respond independently, thereby requiring external assistance, although not necessarily at the national or international level.
  - Large-scale disasters are events that affect an entire society or substantial portions of it and demand coordinated responses at the national level and, in many cases, support from the international community.
  - Frequent and infrequent disasters are distinguished by the likelihood of their occurrence and the return period of the hazard involved. While infrequent disasters may cause severe immediate damage, frequent disasters can have compounding effects over time, potentially creating long-term or chronic stress for communities and societies.
  - Slow-onset disasters develop progressively over an extended period rather than occurring abruptly. These disasters are often linked to environmental or biological processes such as drought, desertification, rising sea levels, or the spread of epidemic diseases.
  - Sudden-onset disasters arise rapidly and are typically triggered by unexpected hazardous events. Examples include earthquakes, volcanic eruptions, flash floods, industrial or chemical accidents, failures of critical infrastructure, and transportation-related incidents.

It is usual to divide disasters into natural or human-made. Recently the divide between natural, man-made and man-accelerated disasters has become harder to draw. Some manufactured disasters such as smog and acid rain have been wrongly attributed to nature.

=== Related to natural hazards ===
Disasters with links to natural hazards are commonly called natural disasters. However experts have questioned this term for a long time.

Disasters with links to natural hazards
Example	Profile
Avalanche	The sudden, drastic flow of snow down a slope, occurring when either natural triggers, such as loading from new snow or rain, or artificial triggers, such as explosives or backcountry skiers.
Blizzard	A severe snowstorm characterized by very strong winds and low temperatures
Earthquake	The shaking of the Earth's crust, caused by underground volcanic forces of breaking and shifting rock beneath the Earth's surface
Fire (wild)	Fires that originate in uninhabited areas and which pose the risk to spread to inhabited areas (see also Wildfire § Climate change effects)
Flood	Flash flooding: Small creeks, gullies, dry streambeds, ravines, culverts or even low-lying areas flood quickly (see also Effects of climate change)
Freezing rain	Rain occurring when outside surface temperature is below freezing
Heat wave	A prolonged period of excessively hot weather relative to the usual weather pattern of an area and relative to normal temperatures for the season (see also Effects of climate change § Heat waves and temperature extremes).
Landslide	Geological phenomenon which includes a range of ground movement, such as rock falls, deep failure of slopes and shallow debris flows
Lightning strike	An electrical discharge caused by lightning, typically during thunderstorms
Limnic eruption	The sudden eruption of carbon dioxide from deep lake water
Tornado	A violently rotating column of air caused by the convergence of an updraft of warm air and a downdraft of cold air
Tropical cyclone	Rapidly rotating storm system characterized by a low-pressure center, a closed low-level atmospheric circulation, strong winds, and a spiral arrangement of thunderstorms that produce heavy rain and squalls (see also Tropical cyclones and climate change)
Tsunami	A series of waves hitting shores strongly, mainly caused by the displacement of a large volume of a body of water, typically an ocean or a large lake, usually caused by earthquakes, volcanic eruptions, underwater explosions, landslides, glacier calvings, meteorite impacts and other disturbances above or below water
Volcanic eruption	The release of hot magma, volcanic ash and/or gases from a volcano

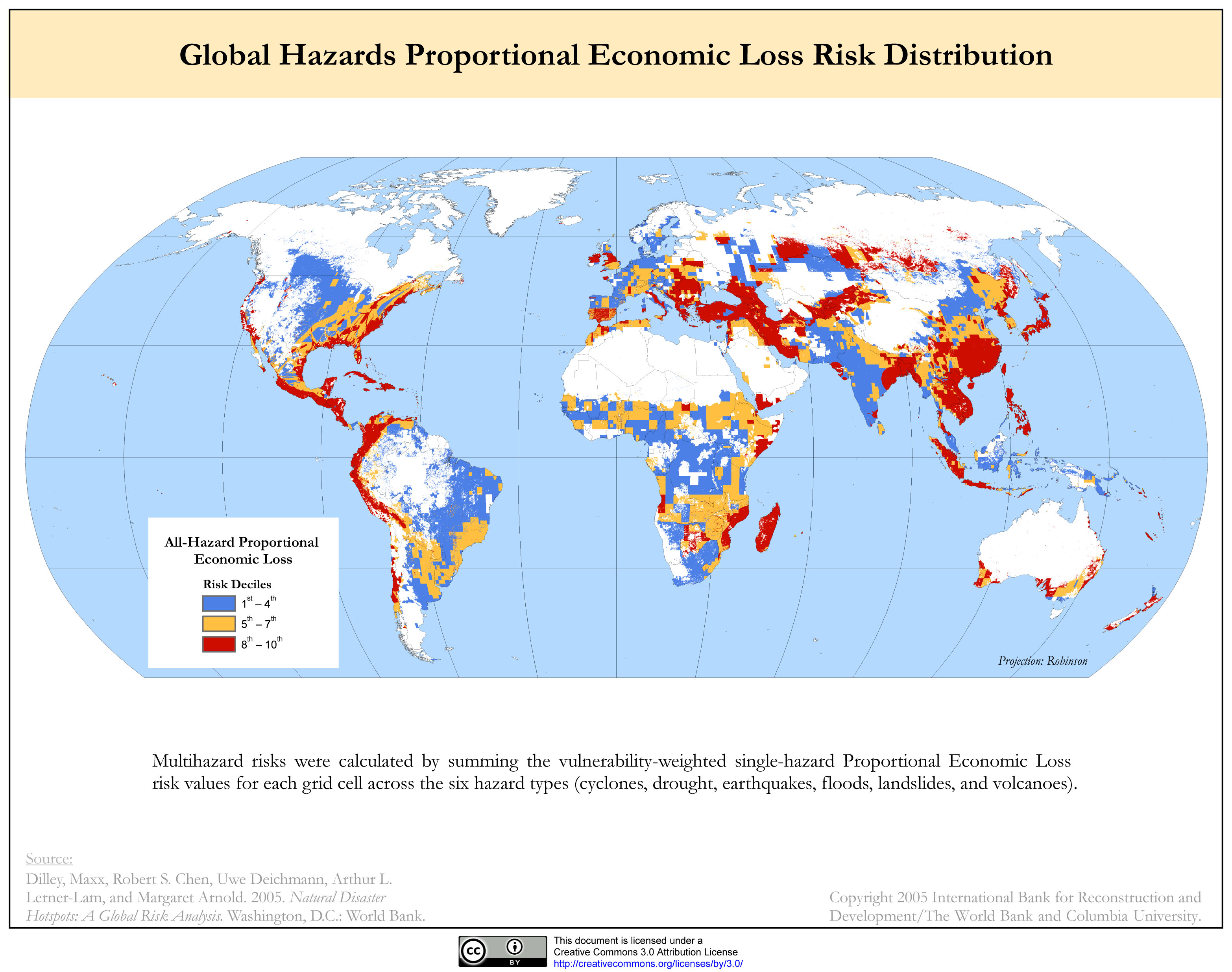
Economic loss risk for six natural disasters: tropical cyclones, droughts, earthquakes, floods, landslides, and volcanoes.

A natural disaster is the very harmful impact on a society or community brought by a natural phenomenon or hazard. Some examples of natural hazards include avalanches, droughts, earthquakes, floods, heat waves, landslides - including submarine landslides, tropical cyclones, volcanic activity and wildfires. Additional natural hazards include blizzards, dust storms, firestorms, hails, ice storms, sinkholes, thunderstorms, tornadoes and tsunamis.

A natural disaster can cause loss of life or property damage. It typically causes economic damage. How bad the damage is depends on how well people are prepared for disasters and how strong the buildings, roads, and other structures are.

Scholars have argued the term "natural disaster" is unsuitable and should be abandoned. Instead, the simpler term disaster could be used. At the same time, the type of hazard would be specified. A disaster happens when a natural or human-made hazard impacts a vulnerable community. It results from the combination of the hazard and the exposure of a vulnerable society.

=== Unrelated to natural hazards ===
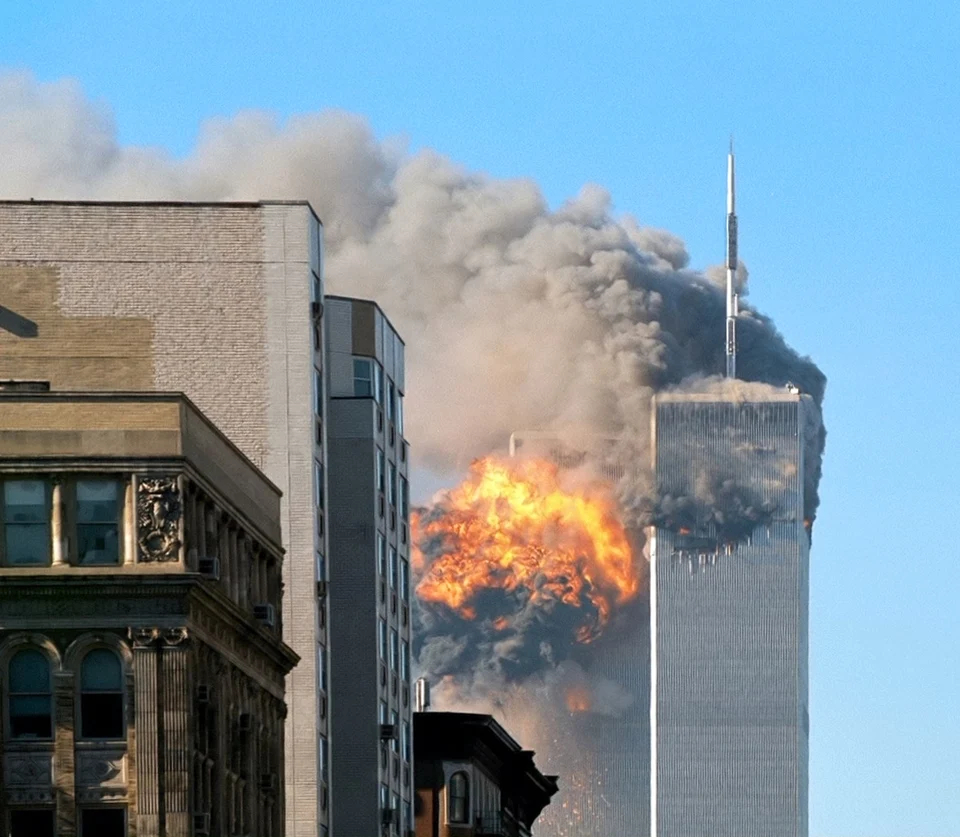
Airplane crashes and terrorist attacks are examples of man-made disasters: they kill and injure people, destroy and damage property, and cause pollution. The pictured example is the September 11 attacks in 2001 at the World Trade Center in New York City.

Human-made disasters are serious harmful events caused by human actions and social processes. Technological hazards also fall into this category. That is because they result in human-instigated disasters. Human-made hazards are sometimes called anthropogenic hazards. Examples include criminality, social unrest, crowd crushes, fires, transport accidents, industrial accidents, power outages, oil spills, terrorist attacks, and nuclear explosions/nuclear radiation. Catastrophic climate change, nuclear war, and bioterrorism also fall into this category.

Climate change and environmental degradation are sometimes called socio-natural hazards. These are hazards involving a combination of both natural and human factors. All disasters can be regarded as human-made, because of failure to introduce the right emergency management measures.

Famines may be caused locally by drought, flood, fire or pestilence. Long-lasting local shortages, especially during the modern era, are generally due to government mismanagement, violent conflict, or an economic system that does not distribute food where needed.

Disasters without links to natural hazards
Disaster	Profile
Bioterrorism	The intentional release or dissemination of biological agents as a means of coercion
Civil unrest	A disturbance caused by a group of people that may include sit-ins and other forms of obstructions, riots, sabotage and other forms of crime, and which is intended to be a demonstration to the public and the government, but can escalate into general chaos
Fire (urban)	Even with strict building fire codes, people still perish in fires
Hazardous material spills	The escape of solids, liquids, or gases that can harm people, other living organisms, property or the environment, from their intended controlled environment such as a container.
Nuclear and radiation accidents	An event involving the significant release of radioactivity to the environment or a reactor core meltdown and which leads to major undesirable consequences to people, the environment, or the facility
Power failure	Caused by summer or winter storms, lightning or construction equipment digging in the wrong location

=== Others ===
Complex disasters, where there is no single root cause, are more common in developing countries. A specific hazard may also spawn a secondary disaster that increases the impact. A classic example is an earthquake that causes a tsunami. This results in coastal flooding, damaging a nuclear power plant on the coast. The Fukushima nuclear disaster is a case in point. Experts examine these cascading events to see how risks and impacts can amplify and spread. This is particularly important given the increase in climate risks.

Some researchers distinguish between recurring events like seasonal flooding and unpredictable one-off events. Recurring events often carry an estimate of how often they occur. Experts call this the return period.

== Effects ==
The effects of a disaster include all human, material, economic and environmental losses and impacts.

The Emergency Events Database (EM-DAT) records statistics about disasters related to natural hazards. For 2023, EM-DAT recorded 399 disasters, which was higher than the 20-year average of 369.

=== Health effects ===
Injuries

In the immediate aftermath of a disaster, physical injuries are often the most urgent concern. The severity of damage to local infrastructure may require emergency responders and community health workers to establish temporary triage or treatment sites. Among natural hazards, earthquakes are generally associated with the highest number of injuries, compared to events such as floods, storms, wildfires, or tsunamis.

Chronic disease–related emergencies

Many disasters disrupt electricity, transportation, and healthcare systems, creating serious risks for individuals with chronic illnesses. People who rely on ongoing medical treatment such as those with diabetes, kidney disease, respiratory conditions, or cardiovascular disorders are particularly vulnerable when access to medication, medical equipment, or healthcare facilities is interrupted.

Hygiene and disease transmission

Damage to essential infrastructure, including water supply systems, sanitation networks, and energy services, can lead to secondary public health risks. Contaminated drinking water, nonfunctional sewage systems, and reduced waste management increase the likelihood of infectious disease outbreaks. Prolonged power outages may also compromise food safety, medication storage, and the safe operation of healthcare facilities.

Food insecurity

Distribution of estimated agricultural losses from disasters by region, 1991–2023.

Economic loss in agriculture and non-agricultural sectors by hazard type, 1991 - 2023.

Disasters frequently disrupt food production and distribution systems. While supply chains may be temporarily interrupted, damage to agricultural land, livestock, or food processing facilities can create longer-term food shortages. These disruptions may contribute to rising food prices, disproportionately affecting low-income and vulnerable populations. Disasters have inflicted an estimated US$3.26 trillion in agricultural losses between 1991 and 2023, averaging at US$99 billion per year. Disaster losses in agriculture totalled US$3.26 trillion over 33 years from 1991 to 2023, with nearly US$2.9 trillion attributed to climate-related disasters, including floods, droughts and heatwaves.

Losses in the 1990s averaged US$64 billion annually; gradual increased throughout the 2000s reaching US$67 billion per year; and a severe escalation from 2010 onwards with losses at US$144 billion annually. Disasters can also disrupt access to nutritious foods, potentially forcing households to adopt quantity-over-quality approaches that emphasize staple foods over nutritious options, such as fruits and vegetables, which provide essential micronutrients. This dietary shift may occur not only due to reduced production or availability of nutritious foods but also because of increased prices, disrupted market access or reduced household income following disasters that affect purchasing power for higher-value nutritious foods.

Mental health effects

Experiencing a disaster can have significant psychological consequences. In the short term, affected populations may experience shock, fear, and grief. Over time, the loss of housing, livelihoods, and social support networks can contribute to mental health conditions such as post-traumatic stress disorder (PTSD), depression, and anxiety. Long-term impacts may also include increased rates of substance misuse.

Damage to healthcare systems

Disasters can severely impair healthcare infrastructure through physical destruction, power failures, or shortages of medical supplies. Hospitals and clinics may be unable to operate at full capacity, while damage to equipment and medication losses further limit care delivery. Population displacement following disasters can also result in healthcare workforce shortages, and in some cases, reduced incentives or resources for rebuilding health facilities.

=== Economic losses ===
Between 2016 and 2020 the total reported economic losses amounted to $293 billion. This figure is likely to be an underestimation. It is very challenging to measure the costs of disasters accurately, and many countries lack the resources and technical capacity to do so. Over the 40-year period from 1980 to 2020 losses were estimated at $5.2 trillion.

=== Human impacts ===
In 2023, natural hazard-related disasters resulted in 86,473 fatalities and affected 93.1 million people. Whilst the number of deaths was much higher than the 20-year average of 64,148, the number affected was much lower than the 20-year average of 175.5 million.

According to a UN report, 91% of deaths from hazards from 1970 to 2019 occurred in developing countries. These countries already have higher vulnerability and lower resilience to these events, which exacerbates the effects of the hazards.

=== Effects of climate change ===
Hazards such as droughts, floods, and cyclones are naturally occurring phenomena. However, climate change has caused these hazards to become more unreliable, frequent and severe. They thus contribute to disaster risks. Countries contributing most to climate change are often at the lowest risk of feeling the consequences. As of 2019, countries with the highest vulnerability per capita release the lowest amount of emissions per capita, and yet still experience the most heightened droughts and extreme precipitation.

Social, cultural, and political perspectives

Scholarly research emphasizes that disaster outcomes are shaped not only by hazardous events but also by social organization, culture, governance, and political economy. In this view, hazard is one component of risk; impacts (mortality, displacement, recovery) are patterned by exposure, vulnerability, and capacity that develop over time through land use, infrastructure, institutions, and everyday practice These perspectives inform contemporary approaches to disaster risk reduction (DRR), which focus on reducing vulnerability and exposure alongside hazard monitoring.

==== Cultural framings in disaster risk reduction ====
Cultural approaches in DRR examine how beliefs, social norms, values, and routines influence risk perception, preparedness, warning response, and recovery. Culture is treated as dynamic: people interpret hazards through shared meanings and practices that evolve with experience and institutional context. Programs can fail if they overlook local meanings or organization (e.g., warning formats, shelter rules, or rebuilding standards that conflict with livelihoods or customary tenure). Co-developed, context-sensitive strategies tend to have higher uptake. Cultural framings are also relevant to warning interpretation and “last-mile” communication. People routinely combine official alerts with heuristics, trusted peers, and place-based knowledge when deciding whether to evacuate or shelter in place. Recognizing these practices can improve message design, timing, and the selection of intermediaries (for example, local associations, faith groups, and community radio).

==== Preparedness as governance under uncertainty ====
Another strand analyzes preparedness as a form of governance. Institutions construct “security imaginaries” shared models of possible threats and appropriate countermeasures and assemble apparatuses intended to function amid uncertainty, such as surveillance networks, stockpiles, expert committees, and emergency operations centers. Preparedness necessarily entails selection: authorities decide which risks to prioritize, which capacities to fund, and how to distribute roles across levels of government and sectors. These choices shape coordination and public expectations of response capability.

In global health, preparedness has included scenario planning, early-warning and surveillance systems, and the maintenance of material reserves to ensure continuity of response when events exceed normal operating conditions. The literature emphasizes that such systems are never exhaustive: they reflect historically specific judgments about plausibility, proportionality, and acceptable trade-offs between objectives (e.g., civil liberties, economic continuity, and protection of life).

===== Critical disaster studies =====
Critical disaster studies examines how power, inequality, and historical processes shape risk, loss, and recovery. Rather than treating a disaster as an exogenous shock to an otherwise level playing field, this approach analyzes how colonialism, segregation, uneven development, and policy choices about land use and infrastructure generate differential exposure to harm and unequal access to protection and assistance.

From this perspective, there are no purely “natural” disasters: hazard interacts with socially produced vulnerability and capacity, which are distributed along lines such as class, race, gender, age, disability, and legal status.

Critical work also attends to questions of representation and voice: whose experiences are documented, which forms of knowledge inform planning, and how media or cultural narratives frame causes and consequences. It further examines the politics of aid and recovery eligibility rules, documentation requirements, and the spatial distribution of assistance and how these practices can reproduce or mitigate pre-existing inequalities.

== Prevention and response ==
=== Disaster risk reduction ===
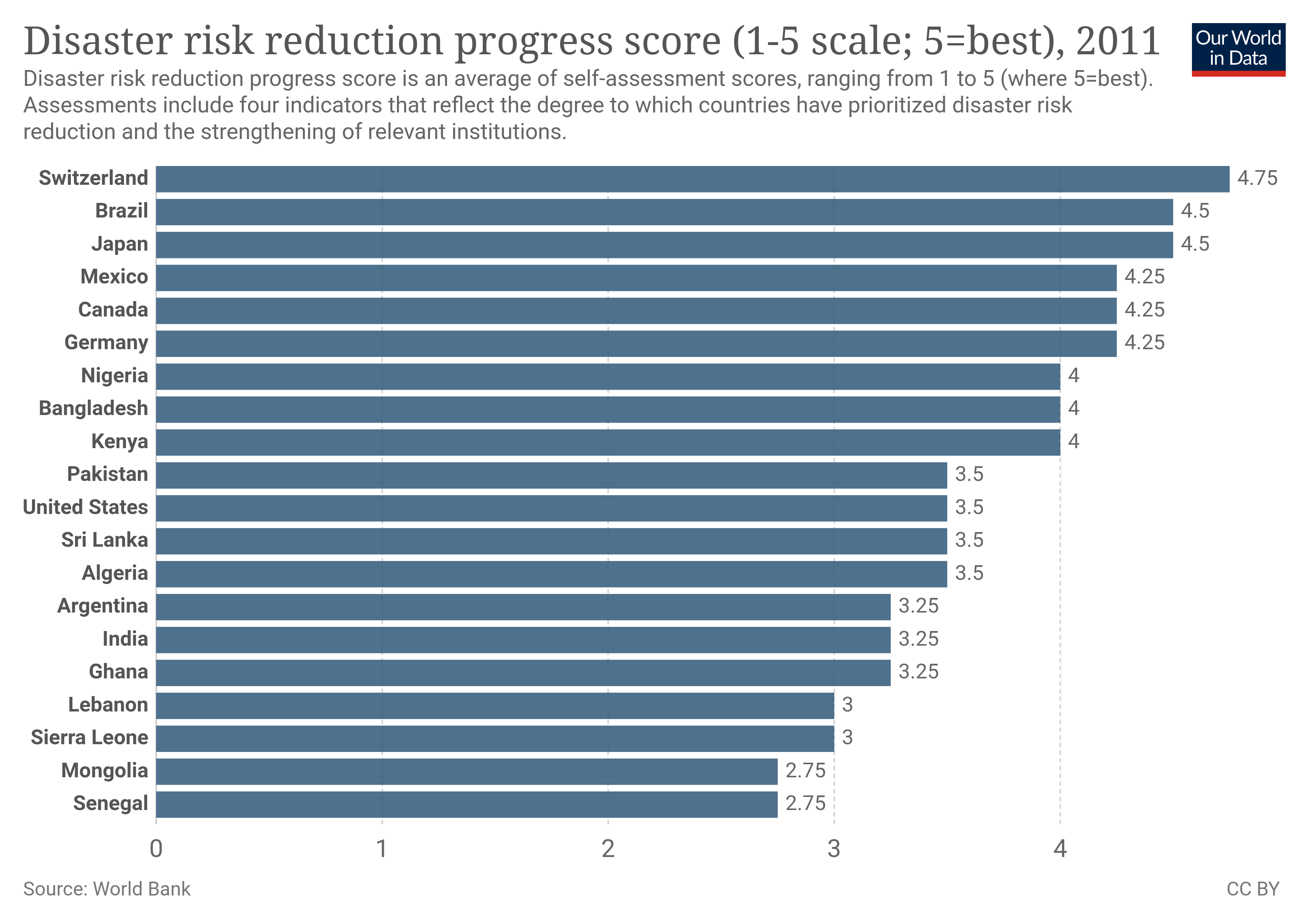
Disaster risk reduction progress score for some countries in 2011. The score of 5 is best. Assessments include four indicators that reflect the degree to which countries have prioritized disaster risk reduction and the strengthening of relevant institutions.

Disaster risk reduction aims to make disasters less likely to happen. The approach, also called DRR or disaster risk management, also aims to make disasters less damaging when they do occur. DRR aims to make communities stronger and better prepared to handle disasters. In technical terms, it aims to make them more resilient or less vulnerable. When DRR is successful, it makes communities less the vulnerable because it mitigates the effects of disasters. This means DRR can make risky events fewer and less severe. Climate change can increase climate hazards. So development efforts often consider DRR and climate change adaptation together.

It is possible to include DRR in almost all areas of development and humanitarian work. People from local communities, agencies or federal governments can all propose DRR strategies. DRR policies aim to "define goals and objectives across different timescales and with concrete targets, indicators and time frames."

=== Disaster response ===
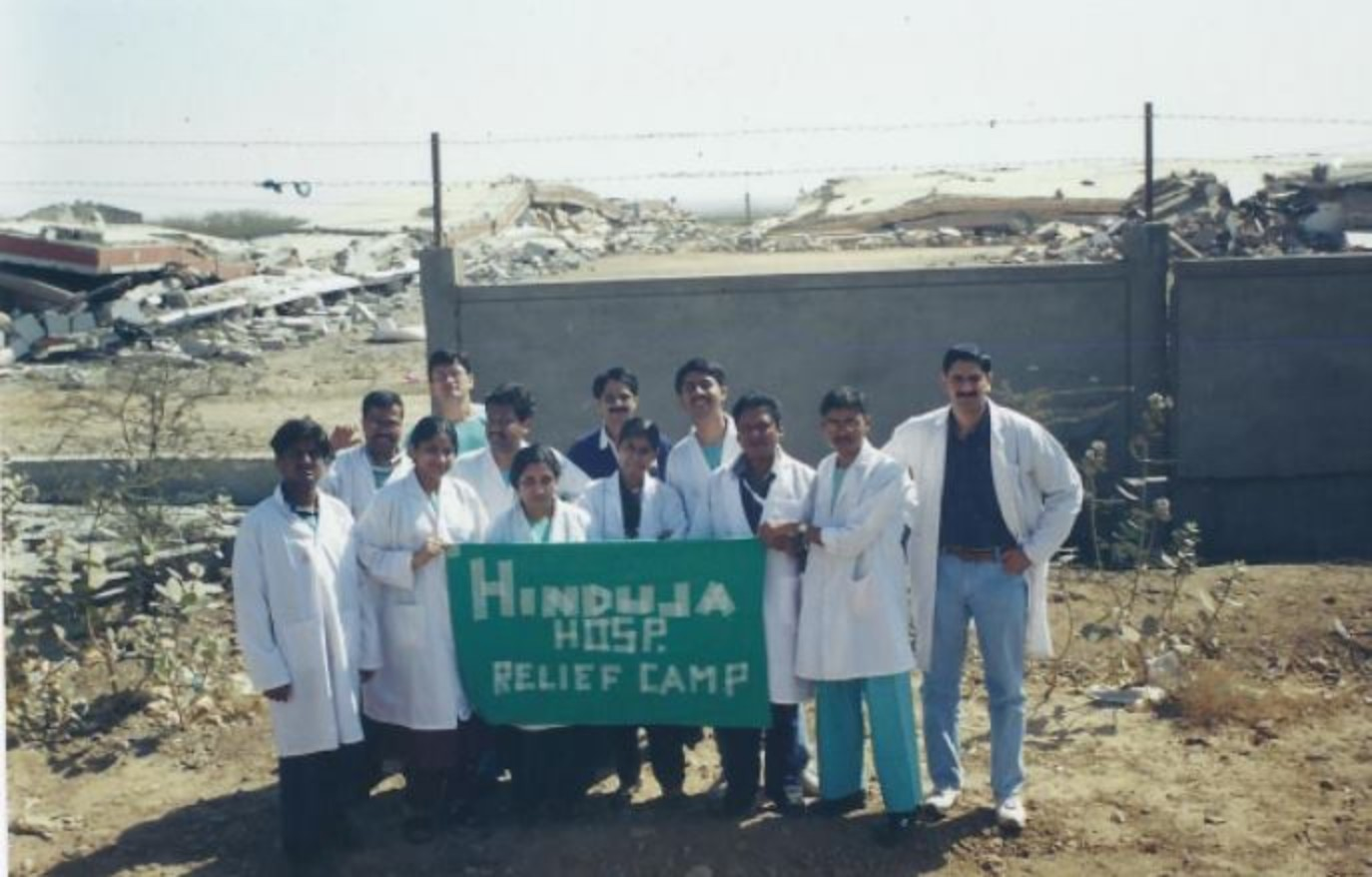
Relief camp at Bhuj after the 2001 Gujarat earthquake

Disaster response refers to the actions taken directly before, during, or immediately after a disaster. The objective is to save lives, ensure health and safety, and meet the subsistence needs of the people affected. It includes warning and evacuation, search and rescue, providing immediate assistance, assessing damage, continuing assistance, and the immediate restoration or construction of infrastructure. An example of this would be building provisional storm drains or diversion dams. Emergency response aims to provide immediate help to keep people alive, improve their health and support their morale. It can involve specific but limited aid, such as helping refugees with transport, temporary shelter, and food, or it can involve establishing semi-permanent settlements in camps and other locations. It may also involve initial repairs to damage to infrastructure, or diverting it.

The response phase focuses on keeping people safe, preventing the next disasters and meeting people's basic needs until more permanent and sustainable solutions are available. The governments where the disaster has happened have the main responsibility for addressing these needs. Humanitarian organisations are often present in this phase of the disaster management cycle. This is especially true in places where the government does not have the resources for a full response.

== Etymology ==
The word disaster is derived from Middle French désastre which comes from Old Italian disastro. This in turn comes from the Ancient Greek pejorative prefix δυσ- (dus-) "bad" and ἀστήρ (aster), "star".

== See also ==
- Act of God – Natural disaster outside human control
- Emergency management – Dealing with all humanitarian aspects of emergencies
- List of accidents and disasters by death toll
- Lists of disasters

== Sources ==
This article incorporates text from a free content work. Licensed under CC BY 4.0 (license statement/permission). Text taken from The Impact of Disasters on Agriculture and Food Security 2025, The Food and Agriculture Organization of the United Nations.
