= Maritime safety =

Maritime safety as part of and overlapping with water safety is concerned with the protection of life (search and rescue) and property through regulation, management and technology development of all forms of waterborne transportation. The executive institutions are the national and transnational maritime administrations. maritime accidents, while characterized by a level of safety of the order of 10^{−5} (1 serious accident per 100,000 movements), which is only slightly inferior to that of the field of air transportation (10^{−6}) are a significant source of risk for insurance companies, transport companies and property owners. Beyond that, of course, ship owners and maritime institutions have to ensure that casualties at sea (mostly by drowning) are kept to the possible minimum. Organizational and human factors are critical antecedents to accidents such as MV Prestige, Herald of Free Enterprise, MS Sleipner, MS Estonia, Bow Mariner and Höegh Osaka as well as the infamous Titanic.

== Technology and innovation ==
In recent years, advances in sensor fusion, artificial intelligence and computer vision have led to the development of predictive safety systems, including Maritime Collision Avoidance Systems, aimed at reducing maritime accidents. AI-powered platforms such as Sea.AI and Watchit.ai assist in identifying non-cooperative objects (e.g., floating debris, small vessels) and alerting operators in real time to potential collision risks, particularly in recreational and coastal navigation contexts.

== International regulation ==
International maritime safety is primarily governed by a set of conventions and codes developed by the International Maritime Organization (IMO), a specialized agency of the United Nations. The cornerstone of this regulatory framework is the International Convention for the Safety of Life at Sea (SOLAS), first adopted in 1914 in response to the sinking of the Titanic. SOLAS establishes minimum safety standards for ship construction, equipment, and operations. Complementary agreements such as the International Safety Management Code (ISM Code), the Convention on the International Regulations for Preventing Collisions at Sea (COLREGs), the Maritime Labour Convention (MLC), and the International Convention on Maritime Search and Rescue (SAR Convention) contribute to a comprehensive global safety regime. National maritime authorities are responsible for implementing and enforcing these standards, often through classification societies and flag state controls.

== Maritime safety and the Russian shadow fleet ==
Shadow fleets have for decades existed as a hidden component of global maritime trade, operating beyond the reach of international oversight. Although the phenomenon is not new, it has expanded significantly in scale and visibility in recent years, particularly following major geopolitical developments and the imposition of international sanctions.

The International Maritime Organization defines so-called “dark” or “shadow” fleets as vessels involved in illicit activities such as sanctions evasion, avoidance of safety or environmental regulations, circumvention of insurance requirements, or other unlawful practices. A defining feature of these ships is their systematic effort to remain undetected, frequently achieved by disabling or manipulating tracing systems such as the Automatic Identification System (AIS) or Long-Range Identification and Tracking (LRIT), as well as by obscuring vessel identity. From an ocean governance and international relations perspective, shadow fleets pose a substantial challenge to existing maritime regimes. They exploit regulatory gaps and weak enforcement mechanisms within the international legal framework, including those established under the United Nations Convention on Law of the Sea (UNCLOS)The expansion of the shadow fleet is widely regarded as increasing the risk of maritime accidents and oil spills. A substantial share of shadow fleet vessels consists of old ships that often operate under opaque ownership arrangements and are associated with low maintenance standards. These vessels frequently change their names and flags, a practice that complicates regulatory and oversight enforcement. While similar tactics have previously been observed in connection with Iranian and Venezuelan oil exports, the scale and complexity of contemporary shadow fleet operations have increased markedly since 2022, following the Russian invasion of Ukraine.

Following the invasion of Ukraine, Western states, including the G7 and the European Union, introduced extensive sanctions targeting key sections of the Russian economy. A central focus of these measures was the oil and gas sector, which historically constituted a substantial share of Russia’s export earnings and state revenues. Sanctions on Russian oil were implemented through two primary mechanisms. First, the EU imposed an embargo on seaborne imports of Russian crude oil and most petroleum products, entering into force between December 2022 and February 2023. Second, the G7 and EU introduced a price gap regime, allowing Western companies to continue providing services for Russian oil exports only if transactions remained below specified price thresholds. The objective of this framework was to preserve global energy supply while constraining Russian revenues. Implemented in EU legislation in October 2022, the framework restricts companies under the jurisdiction of participating states from providing shipping, brokering, technical assistance or insurance services related to global trade of Russian oil unless transactions occur below the price cap. The price cap was initially set as US$60 per barrel for crude oil and has remained unchanged (of 2024). Given the dominant role of EU and G7 companies in maritime insurance and shipping services, the mechanism constrains Russia’s ability to sell oil above the capped price in many markets. The price cap entered into force alongside the corresponding embargoes in December 2022 for seaborne crude oil and February 2023 for petroleum products.

In response to these restrictions, Russia redirected oil exports away from European markets toward alternative buyers, particularly in Asia, and simultaneously expanded its use of a shadow fleet. This fleet consists largely of tankers operating outside G7/EU jurisdictional reach and without access to Western insurance and maritime services, enabling the transport of oil regardless of price cap compliance. While the term shadow fleet had previously been associated mainly with vessels concealing their movements by disabling tracking systems, the Russian shadow fleet reflects a broader and more systematic adaptation to sanctions. As a result, the concept of the shadow fleet has evolved to encompass not only covert tracking practices, but also growing reliance on non-Western owned, uninsured vessels that operate beyond established regulatory and insurance frameworks. This development has raised new concerns regarding maritime safety, environmental risk, and the effectiveness of international sanctions enforcement. Furthermore, Russia has redirected a significant share of its oil exports toward alternative markets, primarily in countries that have not adopted the sanctions framework.

Available estimates indicate that between 1st of January 2023 and 30th of June 2024, approximately 307 tankers associated with the Russian shadow fleet transported crude oil in at least one quarter during the period. This figure broadly aligns with earlier assessments, including findings published by the KSE Institute.

== Institutions ==
For a complete list, see Category:Maritime safety organizations

=== Europe ===
- European Maritime Safety Agency
- Maritime Gendarmerie
- Danish Maritime Safety Administration
- Norwegian Maritime Authority
- Maritime Safety and Rescue Society
- Turkish Coast Guard
- Directorate General of Coastal Safety of the Republic of Türkiye
- Italian Coast Guard

=== Asia ===
- China Maritime Safety Administration
- Japan Coast Guard

=== Africa ===
- South African Maritime Safety Authority
- Nigerian Maritime Administration and Safety Agency

=== Americas ===
- United States Coast Guard

== Systems ==
- Global Maritime Distress and Safety System
- Maritime Safety and Security Information System
- SeaVision

== See also ==
- Active Shipbuilding Experts' Federation
- Maritime security
  - Maritime Safety and Security Team
- Marine safety
- Maritime Awareness Global Network
- Maritime domain awareness
- HNS Convention
- William Alden Smith
- SS Edmund Fitzgerald, a wreck which prompted major safety improvement on the Great Lakes of North America
- International Safety Management Code
- Life vest
- Coast guard
- Lighthouse

== Literature ==
- Chauvin, Christine (2011-09-12). "Human Factors and Maritime Safety". Journal of Navigation. 64 (4). Cambridge University Press (CUP): 625–632. doi:10.1017/s0373463311000142. ISSN 0373-4633. S2CID 129186816.
- Oltedal, Helle (2018). Managing maritime safety. London: Routledge. ISBN 978-0-203-71297-9. OCLC 1021303983.
