= A Cooperative Strategy for 21st Century Seapower =

United States maritime strategy

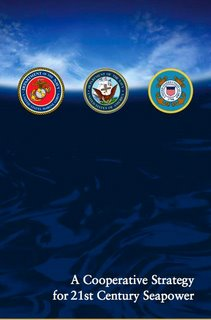

A Cooperative Strategy for 21st Century Seapower is the United States' maritime strategy. It was originally presented by the U.S. Chief of Naval Operations and the Commandants of the U.S. Marine Corps and U.S. Coast Guard at the International Seapower Symposium at the U.S. Naval War College in Newport, Rhode Island on October 17, 2007. The new maritime strategy explains the comprehensive role of the sea services in an era marked by globalization, and uncertainty.

The development of a new strategy began in June 2006 at the direction of former Chief of Naval Operations and Chairman of the Joint Chiefs of Staff, Admiral Mike Mullen. The previous maritime strategy was published at the height of the Cold War in 1986 and needed to be updated to reflect the challenges of the 21st century. This was the first maritime strategy to be signed by the leaders of all three U.S. sea services, the Navy, Marines, and Coast Guard.

A Cooperative Strategy for 21st Century Seapower is not infused with typical military-focused language. The strategy makes a case for the value of seapower in preserving the American way of life by maintaining safe, global commerce operations across the seas. It acknowledges that there is a global system of connected economies which depends on the freedom of movement across the maritime commons; the principal means for the transit of 90% of the world's commerce by weight and volume. With such a global interconnection of economies, shocks to the system caused by regional conflicts, terrorist attacks, natural disasters, and war all have potential global impact. The strategy states that U.S. vital interests are best served by having forward positioned maritime forces around the globe, postured in a way to prevent, deter, limit, and localize conflicts, wars, and disruptions to the global system that all rely upon. International from beginning to end, the strategy describes the necessity to forge global partnerships to establish a resilient peace.

During testimony before the House Armed Services Committee on December 13, 2007, General James T. Conway, Commandant of the U.S. Marine Corps said:

The basic premise of our newly published maritime strategy is that the United States is a force for good in the world-that while we are capable of launching a clenched fist when we must- offering the hand of friendship is also an essential and prominent tool in our kit. That premise flows from the belief that preventing wars is as important as winning wars.

== Expanding naval core capabilities ==
A Cooperative Strategy for 21st Century Seapower articulates that U.S. maritime forces be able to operate across the full spectrum of operations, raising the prevention of war to a level equal to the conduct of war. The strategy delineates the following six expanded core capabilities for U.S. Seapower to achieve a balance of peacetime engagement and major combat operations capabilities:

1. Forward presence
2. Deterrence
3. Sea control
4. Power projection
5. Maritime security
6. Humanitarian assistance/disaster response

The first four core elements listed have always been fundamental to U.S. maritime forces and were essential elements to the United States and its allies and partners during the Cold War. The last two, Maritime Security and Humanitarian Assistance/Disaster Response, were elevated to core elements by the new maritime strategy. The U.S. sea services have traditionally done these types of missions but they will seek to be more proactive and purposeful in training, missions, and resourcing the missions and capabilities associated with them.

The new maritime strategy reaffirms the need for regionally concentrated, forward deployed combat power; but also places emphasis on globally distributed, mission-tailored maritime forces. Specifically the new maritime strategy states that:

1. Regionally concentrated, credible combat power: The U.S. sea services will maintain credible combat power forward "in the Western Pacific and the Arabian Gulf/Indian Ocean to protect vital interests, assure friends and allies of the continuing U.S. commitment to regional security, and deter and dissuade potential adversaries and peer competitors." The maritime strategy states that the U.S. does not seek adversaries, nor single out any one nation, but will be best postured to maintain security and freedom of movement across the maritime domain.
2. Globally distributed, mission-tailored maritime forces: The U.S. sea services will establish a persistent global presence using distributed forces that are organized by mission, comprising integrated U.S. Navy, Marine Corps, and Coast Guard capabilities. Aircraft carrier and Expeditionary Strike Groups will continue to deploy much as they do now, but they will also use smaller groups or units to provide this presence across the globe, such as the Global Fleet Station.

In signing a cooperative strategy, the U.S. sea services also raise the importance of cooperative relationships as the basis for global maritime security – a common goal of all maritime nations regardless of political differences. Maritime nations have always shared common interests on the sea and even land-locked nations rely on the safety of those seas to maintain and enhance their way of life. The challenge for the United States is how to apply seapower in a manner that protects U.S. vital and domestic interests, even as it promotes greater collective security, stability, and trust across the globe.

During the presentation of the new strategy to nearly 100 chiefs of navies and coast guards from around the world at the Naval War College on October 17, 2007, Chief of Naval Operations, Admiral Gary Roughead, the Navy's top uniformed officer, said humanitarian and disaster aid is built on, "peace-time relationships to help mitigate human suffering by working together with other agencies and other nations responding to crises".

While presenting the U.S. Coast Guard perspective on the new U.S. maritime strategy at the same symposium, Admiral Thad Allen, Commandant of the U.S. Coast Guard, said the new maritime strategy reinforced the time-honored missions his service carried out in this U.S. since 1790. He said:

It reinforces the Coast Guard maritime strategy of safety, security and stewardship, and it reflects not only the global reach of our maritime services but the need to integrate and synchronize and act with our coalition and international partners to not only win wars... but to prevent wars.

The new strategy is viewed as a welcome makeover from the Soviet-centric document developed in 1986, but has drawn some criticism from military analysts who say it is too broad-based and lacked a fourth, "implementation" stage. Former Secretary of the Navy John Lehman hailed its tenets but pointed out it was lacking information on the actual hardware needed to carry out the policy. In the November 2007 issue of Proceedings magazine, he explained, "we (need) a clear and well-articulated statement of what we need to implement that strategy – tightly bound to the strategy itself." He concedes however, that the most important attribute of the updated strategy is, "that it exists at all ... and that its development was taken so seriously."

== Development of the new maritime strategy ==
The new maritime strategy included many voices during its development. Input was sought from individuals and organizations such as the United States Department of Defense, the Joint Staff, Unified Combatant Commands, business and academia and other U.S. interagency partners.

During development of the new strategy, military planners sought to address the changing 21st century world and anticipate key uncertainties such as what the United States' grand military strategy and foreign policy will be in the next few decades. Planners considered a range of maritime strategy options: primacy, cooperative security, selective engagement and offshore balance. These paradigms commonly are used by military planners to measure the quality of strategic components against hypothetical challenges. A series of war games conducted by the Naval War College helped determine which options were the best to focus upon.

From six hypothetical paradigms, planners drafted five possible maritime strategies, which were later whittled down to three. With three strategies in hand, teams of senior leaders and military planners from the U.S. Navy, Marine Corps and Coast Guard traveled to locations around the United States to present the strategy options to American citizens as part of a program called the "Conversation with the Country" to elicit their feedback and input on potential strategies.

The Conversation with the Country program is discussed in the preface of the new strategy:

Our citizens were deeply involved in development of this strategy through a series of public forums known as the "Conversations with the Country." Three themes dominated these discussions: our people want us to remain strong; they want us to protect them and our homeland; and they want us to work with partners around the world to prevent war. This message, coupled with rigorous academic research, analysis and debate, led to a comprehensive strategy designed to meet the expectations and needs of the American people.

The sea services hosted "Conversations with the Country" in the following cities during the development of the maritime strategy:

1. Phoenix – January 24, 2007
2. Atlanta – February 9, 2007
3. Seattle – March 9, 2007
4. San Francisco – March 12, 2007
5. Chicago – April 9, 2007
6. New York – April 16, 2007

Feedback from the participants in the first round of the Conversations with the Country program helped shape the final maritime strategy, which was unveiled October 17, 2007. Another round of Conversations began following the launch of the new maritime strategy that brought senior officers from the Navy, Marine Corps and Coast Guard to more U.S. cities, where they presented the new strategy to business and civic leaders and discussed future roles of the three sea services in protecting the homeland and working with global partners to prevent war. American cities visited since the new strategy was unveiled were:

1. Miami – November 15, 2007
2. Houston – January 24, 2008
3. Portland – February 21. 2008
4. Denver – March 27, 2008
5. Los Angeles – April 17, 2008

In addition to the city symposia, Navy, Marine Corps, and Coast Guard leaders met with local universities and faculty in a program called "Campus Conversations." Sea service leadership felt it was important to present the strategy to future leaders and listen to feedback. Campus Conversations took place at the following universities:

1. University of Miami – November 16, 2007
2. Rice University – January 23, 2008
3. Oregon State University – February 20, 2008
4. University of Denver – March 26, 2008
5. University of Southern California – April 15, 2008

== Humanitarian and disaster relief operations and seapower strategy ==
A Cooperative Strategy for 21st Century Seapower calls for a diplomacy-building approach echoing the mantra that "preventing wars is as important as winning wars" and "focuses on opportunities versus threats; on optimism over fear and on confidence instead of doubt". It recognizes the challenges imposed by the uncertain conditions in a time of rapid change and makes pro-active assistance and disaster response crucial elements to building relationships across nations. By working with the U.S. State Department, U.S. Agency for International Development (USAID) and non-governmental organizations, maritime forces provide unique capabilities to bear in times of crisis as set forth in the strategy.

While humanitarian missions are generally not traditionally thought of as major sea service missions, military leaders say these tasks are crucial for promoting maritime security. Admiral Gary Roughead said this strategy takes homeland defense, "a step further". He says that "through globally persistent, maritime forces, U.S. seapower will always exist primarily to fight and help win our nation's wars but... we can do more."

When Tropical Cyclone Sidr struck the southern coast of Bangladesh on November 15, 2007, U.S. Navy Sailors and Marines offered almost immediate assistance. Within days, the 11th Marine Expeditionary Unit (MEU), embarked on the amphibious ship Tarawa, was in the devastated country providing crucial care to wounded and displaced citizens. Military corpsmen and doctors bandaged the wounded and worked in concert with the U.S. State Department and the U.S. Agency for International Development (USAID) helping the neediest from a storm that left several hundred thousand Bangladeshis homeless. After the storm, U.S. service members also provided maritime security patrols around the coast of Bangladesh.

The military sea services also responded swiftly to the tsunami that struck Indonesia and Southeast Asia in December 2004. Marines from Naval Environmental and Preventive Medicine Unit Six (NEPMU-6) left their home base of Pearl Harbor a few days later deploying to Indonesia. Once there, dozens of NEPMU members provided humanitarian support including medical help and conducted water quality testing and insect collection for disease examination. Less than a week after the storm hit, Navy helicopters from the aircraft carrier, Abraham Lincoln were flying over the Indian Ocean transporting supplies, bringing in disaster relief teams and supporting humanitarian airlifts to tsunami-stricken coastal regions.

The U.S. Coast Guard provided relief to the tsunami-affected regions of Southeast Asia, delivering over 40,000 pounds of food January 21, 2005 in the form of emergency high energy biscuits, to Medan, Indonesia and over 21,000 pounds of medical supplies, and temporary shelters to Utaphao, Thailand via two Coast Guard C130 airplanes. Additionally, the U.S. Coast Guard cutter Douglas Munro shuttled more than 80 tons of humanitarian relief supplies from Singapore to the Navy amphibious assault ship Bonhomme Richard for distribution to tsunami victims in northern Indonesia.

Admiral Gary Roughead said the U.S. response to the 2004 tsunami in Southeast Asia was, "a demonstration to ourselves and to others of the value of being able to render humanitarian assistance and disaster response from the sea". He added, "There is no way we could have done it without the sea-based capabilities of an aircraft carrier and expeditionary forces."

The U.S. sea services also respond to domestic emergencies when needed. When Hurricane Katrina flooded large portions of New Orleans and the Gulf Coast in 2005, maritime forces responded. Following the late-summer storm, Harry S. Truman, Iwo Jima and other Virginia-based Navy ships headed to the Gulf Coast to help with relief efforts. Thousands of military members were dispatched including Naval Mobile Construction Battalions and six Disaster Relief Teams (DRTs) providing amphibious construction equipment, medical personnel and supplies to the flooded areas.

== Global partnerships ==
Speaking to the San Diego Military Advisory Council (SDMAC) October 17, 2007, Vice Chief of Naval Operations, Admiral Patrick M. Walsh spoke of a "global system in transition...unsettled, unbalanced and potentially dangerous for the U.S. and the global community, means we need to seek a balanced and stable world, one where we can be best postured and trained to promote stability." He discussed the importance of partnering with allies, relief organizations and maritime forces of other nations for a long-term approach and doing so, "before a contingency situation arises".

According to U.S. military leaders, a key ingredient to carrying out a successful maritime strategy is building relationships with other countries before an emergency strikes. Admiral Walsh told the group that the maritime strategy's long-term goal was for a "sustained approach (so that) when we train, organize, equip and recruit, it's with that goal of building strong global partnerships in mind." Admiral Walsh added that developing relationships with other countries during peacetime promotes global security. "What's important today is what we build in peace. What comes next is generosity, humanity, recognition of other positions without compromise of national interests."

=== Africa Partnership Station ===
Bilateral relationship development is happening currently with operations such as the Navy's Africa Partnership Station, (APS). This sea service focused program has U.S. and European troops working alongside non-governmental organizations and governmental organizations to promote better maritime security and stability in the waters off West Africa. During a seven-month deployment that began October 30, 2007, crews of two U.S. Navy ships conducted exercises and port visits with their counterparts throughout West and Central Africa and the Gulf of Guinea.

The team, made up of representatives of multiple U.S. federal agencies, was embarked on the amphibious dock landing ship Fort McHenry and the High Speed Vessel Swift, where they conducted training exercises with their African partners to help build their capacity to increase maritime security in their regional waters. The training focused on building critical "at sea" skills that included boarding, search and seizure, search and rescue, damage control and other critical skills.

In March 2008, the Navy partnered with the private non-governmental organization, Project Hope delivering half a billion dollars' worth of medical supplies and equipment to nations throughout West Africa as part of the Africa Partnership Station program. On March 27, 2008, Liberia's president, Ellen Johnson Sirleaf, visited Liberian Army members on board the Fort McHenry who were taking leadership courses with their U.S. military counterparts. She lauded the Africa Partnership Station for coming to Liberia to provide humanitarian and military services to the people of Liberia as well as personnel of the Armed Forces of Liberia. Speaking at program marking the donation of medical supplies and equipment, as well as, postal boxes to the government of Liberia by the U.S. Navy in collaboration with the U.S. Embassy in Liberia, Johnson-Sirleaf said "it was amazing to see people from different countries volunteering their services to help others who were in need".

== Maritime cooperation ==
A Cooperative Strategy for 21st Century Seapower highlights cooperation by the U.S. sea services with maritime counterparts around the world. It calls for U.S. maritime forces and their international partners to be vigilant about keeping the sea lanes free and open for commerce, ensuring pirates and smugglers are thwarted and sea borne terrorist events are prevented.

The "Thousand Ship Navy" concept, later renamed the "Global Maritime Partnership," calls for the voluntary development of networked and self-organizing partnerships to guard the maritime commons. Such coalitions have taken shape over the last decade in response to piracy off the coast of Somalia and in the Strait of Malacca.

Speaking at the International Seapower Symposium held at the Naval War College October 17, 2007, U.S. Navy Admiral Gary Roughead said the key to maritime security is being aware of that which is, "moving above, on and under the ocean, or "maritime domain awareness". Roughead told the international audience that trust among nations is critical to carrying out the strategy and that "trust cannot be surged... it is something that must be built over time, through discussions, activities and through exercises (and) initiatives that each of us may undertake and bring others into."
