= Maritime Safety and Security Information System =

The Maritime Safety and Security Information System (MSSIS) is an unclassified, near-real-time global data-sharing network designed to enhance maritime domain awareness by enabling participating governments to exchange vessel-tracking and sensor information via automatic identification system (AIS). Developed and operated by the U.S. Department of Transportation's Volpe National Transportation Systems Center, MSSIS aggregates data from member states into a central exchange, allowing each contributor to ingest, use and view combined data from other nations while preserving national sovereignty over participation.

== MSSIS Background ==
MSSIS was developed by the Volpe National Transportation Systems Center at the U.S. Department of Transportation's Research and Innovative Technology Administration and is available to nations worldwide to improve global maritime safety, security, commerce and environmental stewardship.

== Benefits of MSSIS ==
MSSIS provides participating nations access to global shipping information. Specific benefits of sharing AIS data via MSSIS include:

- Feeding data to existing in-country maritime awareness systems & initiatives
- Building regional Vessel Traffic Services (VTS) capabilities
- Allowing the development of vessel safety statistics & analysis of vessel transits
- Serving as the underlying feed for layering complementary data (radar pictures, oil spill monitoring, port operations etc.)

MSSIS serves as the primary data feed for multiple sophisticated applications, including SeaVision, a web application developed by the United States government that supports seafarers and international citizens.

== MSSIS capabilities ==
The Volpe Center provides Transview (TV32), a Microsoft Windows-based application, to access the MSSIS network. Transview provides a means to view MSSIS data and can also serve as interface between the MSSIS network and other Maritime Domain Awareness (MDA) systems a government might already be operating.

Additional capabilities of TV32 include:

- Vessel traffic management (Vessel Traffic Service, situation displays etc.)
- Canal transit management
- Maritime de-confliction
- Safety statistics (via data logging & playback, snapshot files)
- Pilot navigation (ETA, closest point of approach, dead reckoning)
- Accident investigation (via data logging and playback)
- Buoy positioning
- Oil spill modeling display
- Harbor surveillance
- Secure vessel transiting
- Monitoring of territorial waters
- Security zones - dynamic, static, user-defined
- Secure data exchange

== MSSIS Security ==
Because participants view the protection of vessel data from unauthorized use as crucial, MSSIS enables password-protected, Internet-based sharing of AIS data using encrypted data links (TCP/IP SSL Secure Socket Layer).

- No processing, alteration, or storing occurs
- Data is open source and freely shared among participating governments
- Can be used by any system that uses standard format AIS data

== Recognition and awards ==
MSSIS is a winner of the 2008 Innovations in American Government Award from the Ash Institute for Democratic Governance and Innovation at the John F. Kennedy School of Government at Harvard University for its efforts in enhancing levels of safety and economic stability in the global seas.

== How Nations Become Participants ==
By contributing AIS data into MSSIS, a country becomes eligible to receive the AIS data from all nations participating in MSSIS. Technical assistance is available to any country with a willingness to participate. Transview (TV32), the MSSIS client software, is provided free-of-charge by the Volpe Center.

Nations interested in learning more about MSSIS contact the interim MSSIS administrator, the U.S. Office of Global Maritime Situational Awareness, to arrange a visit by a technical assessment team. This team can demonstrate the benefits of MSSIS and discuss participation requirements.

== Resources ==
- Transview (TV32) Installation and Operations Guide for Maritime Safety and Security Information System (MSSIS). U.S. Department of Transportation Volpe Center, Cambridge, MA, July 10, 2008
- The Office of Global Maritime Situational Awareness Maritime Awareness Wiki entry for MSSIS
- The U.S. DOT Volpe Center MSSIS Web site
- The Office of Global Maritime Situational Awareness official Web site
- The Office of Global Maritime Situational Awareness Maritime Awareness Wiki
