= Active Shipbuilding Experts' Federation =

International association representing shipbuilding classification societies

- Established: 26 November 2015
- Headquarters: Tokyo, Japan
- Members: 11
- Chair: Yukito Higaki
- Vice-Chair: Kyu Chong Choi; Li Yanqing
- Council members: Koichi Okuda; Seok-Joo Chung; Yu Xie; Mehtap Ozdemir
- Secretary General: Takuya Minato
- Website: www.asef2015.com

The Active Shipbuilding Experts' Federation is an international non-governmental organization. Its purpose is to contribute sound development of international maritime transportation and further enhancement of the world maritime safety, marine environment protection and maritime security, through communication and cooperation among the shipbuilding industry on technical agenda especially in International Maritime Organization. The federation's activities cover matters in relation to building new ships as well as repair conversions, offshore units.

== Members ==
The Active Shipbuilding Experts' Federation has 11 members. which are constructing more than 90% of global share of new ship deliveries. Members are national shipbuilders' associations or a major shipbuilder in the absence of an association.

The Shipbuilders' Association of Japan (SAJ)
China Association of the National Shipbuilding Industry (CANSI)
(South Korea) Korea Offshore & Shipbuilding Association (KOSHIPA)
(Turkey) Turkish Shipbuilders' Association (GISBIR)
Association of Marine Industries of Malaysia (AMIM)
The Association of Singapore Marine & Offshore Energy Industries (ASMI)
Colombo Dockyard PLC (Sri Lanka)
Shipyard Association of India (SAI)
Indonesia Shipbuilding and Offshore Industry Association (IPERINDO)
(Vietnam) Shipbuilding Industry Corporation (SBIC)
(Thailand) Thai Shipbuilding and Repairing Association (TSBA)
