= Maritime incident =

Transport incident involving watercraft

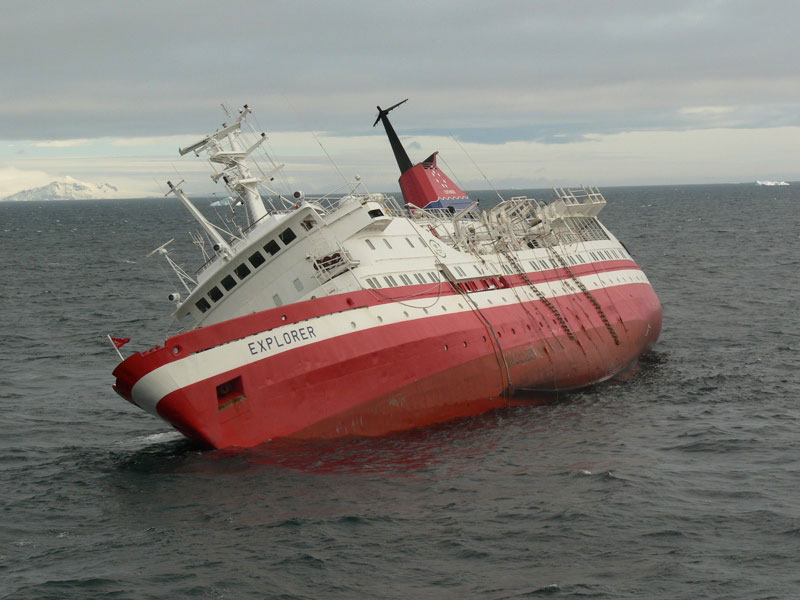
The sinking of MS Explorer in 2007

Marine accident, maritime disaster or maritime incident refers to a transport accident involving watercraft.

Writer William Langewiesche, in a 2018 Vanity Fair article, stated a statistic that in every two or three day period, a commercial ship sinks, and usually those ships are characterized by employees who make insufficient wages and companies which do not have sufficient safeguards; he added that the ones that sink are often registered to flag of convenience countries. He stated that maritime incidents often result from multiple factors, just as aviation accidents and incidents do. Langewiesche stated in 2018 that "Disasters at sea do not get the public attention that aviation accidents do, in part because the sea swallows the evidence."

== History ==
The sinking of the RMS Titanic in 1912 led to the introduction of SOLAS (Convention for the Safety of Life at Sea).

== See also ==
- List of maritime disasters
- Maritime safety
- Oil spill
- Sailing ship accident
- Ship collision
- Shipwreck
