= GMISS =

The Global Maritime Information Sharing Symposium (GMISS) is an annual event hosted by the National MDA Coordination Office (NMCO) to align U.S. Government outreach to the maritime industry and improve and increase industry-government maritime information sharing partnerships.

== Background ==
Maritime information sharing has been demonstrated as an effective means of improving security, safety, and environmental protection, while increasing efficiency and reducing friction for legitimate commerce. The policies governing the U.S. federal government's use and sharing of information are being revised to permit and promote information sharing. GMISS provides the maritime industry with an ongoing forum to help shape the development of maritime information-sharing policies.

== Symposium Framework ==
This annual symposium brings together representatives of the private sector, non-governmental organizations, and government agencies to collaborate on a global system of maritime information sharing.

The symposium supports the U.S. Department of Transportation Maritime Administration (MARAD) in developing a coherent federal outreach and coordination effort. Leading up to this symposium, the U.S. Navy (USN) and U.S. Coast Guard (USCG) had expressed the need to expand their relationship with industry as outlined in the Cooperative Strategy for a 21st Century Seapower. As government agencies have increasingly realized the benefits of partnering with the maritime industry, however, there has been a flurry of "commercial outreach" and a deluge of information requests that are overwhelming industry and rapidly eroding its eagerness and ability to respond . The maritime community, both directly and through its various associations, has expressed frustration and confusion over the seemingly uncoordinated efforts by government entities to support maritime trade and security and the demands being placed on maritime trade and security.

The GMISS was undertaken to harness this government's energy for engagement and to establish a means to coordinate a more cohesive dialogue between government and maritime industry representatives. GMISS is an opportunity to demonstrate that a USN/USCG/MARAD partnership can open the doors of communication to advance the maritime strategy further, and equally, begin to provide the coordination necessary to present a unified voice to the maritime community.

The long-range (multi-year) objectives of the GMISS include:

- Coordinate the U.S. Government's maritime commercial outreach
- Implement industry/government working groups
- Highlight specific government relationships
- Promote regional involvement
- Engage a diverse range of stakeholders

== GMISS Working Groups ==
A key differentiator of GMISS from other government-to-maritime industry outreach conferences is the ongoing working groups of industry and government subject-matter experts, developed through the symposium, that continue to collaborate throughout the year. The working groups enable participants to help define the relationship between industry and government for information sharing.

As a multi-agency office coordinating maritime awareness efforts for the U.S. federal government, OGMSA coordinates participation by subject matter experts from across the government and brings issues before the decision makers who are shaping maritime information sharing policy through the National Maritime Domain Awareness Stakeholders Board and the U.S. Maritime Security Policy Coordinating Committee. OGMSA provides a working group administrator for each team of subject matter experts to coordinate issues through the interagency community.

Working Groups from previous GMIS symposia provide status reports at the following year's symposium, leading to resolutions, recommitments, or redefinitions of the issues.

== GMISS 2008 ==
The inaugural Global Maritime Information Sharing Symposium (GMISS) was held on August 20–21, 2008 at the U.S. Merchant Marine Academy (USMMA) in Kings Point, New York and brought together a more than 125 participants from maritime companies, associations, navies, coast guards and government agencies from around the world.

=== Symposium Structure ===
Through an "issue-to-working-group" progression in this inaugural GMISS, and reflecting the needs of this inaugural symposium's main sponsors—OGMSA, the Department of Justice Office of Community Oriented Policing Services (COPS), U.S. Fleet Forces Command's Naval Cooperation and Guidance for Shipping (NCAGS), and MARAD, the broad topic of open maritime data sharing was approached from three particular vantage points:

- Law Enforcement Information Sharing in the Maritime Environment (The Evolution of Fusion Centers and Information Sharing with Law Enforcement)
- Regional Blue Water Information Sharing (Increased understanding and liaison with commercial shipping)
- Industry and Maritime Information Sharing (Increased understanding and data sharing with the commercial maritime industry)

Symposium attendees were asked to formulate their thoughts around five core questions:

- How can the U.S. Government be more coherent in its approach to the maritime industry?
- What should be the model for information sharing between the U.S. Government and the maritime industry?
- What are the unexploited maritime information sharing opportunities that will benefit the flow of commerce and help trade?
- How do we leverage the national strategy for maritime domain awareness to further these efforts?
- Is there value in continuing an annual symposium such as GMISS as the center of focus for issues and innovations?

This combination of vantage points and core questions was focused in four working groups, each addressing a specific issue. These issues were developed during OGMSA's work with maritime associations such as the World Shipping Council and the Cruise Line International Association (CLIA), as well as numerous individual industry representatives.

- Working Group A: Issue - Can Government Information Requests to Shipping Companies be Consolidated, Streamlined, Standardized, or Reduced?
- Working Group B: Issue - What is the Law Enforcement/Industry Model for an International/Domestic Maritime Information Sharing Center?
- Working Group C: Issue - What does the Maritime Industry Want from the World's Navies and Coast Guards?
- Working Group D: Issue - How do we Create Economic Incentives for Maritime Information Sharing?

=== GMISS 2008 Working Group Findings ===
Consolidated Summary findings as generated from the symposium's four independent working groups can be summarized into the following eight categories and potential courses of action:

- Inventory: Establish baseline maritime information requirements (both government's and industry's)
- Cost/benefit: Determine the cost of providing information that is requested or required versus its intended and real benefits
- Standardize: Standardize the requested information and the procedures for its exchange globally
- Portals/Hubs: Set up commercially based "portals/hubs" through which maritime data can be centralized/exchanged
- Incident Exchange: Set up a global incident information exchange for use by industry/navy/coast guards
- Market: Market all the above broadly across industry/government/navy/coast guards to ensure broadest involvement from all possible stakeholders
- Acta non verba: (i.e., these issues have been discussed enough, let's make them happen).

A summary of individual working group discoveries and action items can be found in the Attachment section of this report.

=== GMISS 2008 Conclusions ===
The concept behind GMISS and its inaugural symposium appears to have been well received by both industry and government attendees, as expressed by their subsequent comments and, of greater importance, by the significant number of industry attendees volunteering to continue to participate in the working groups.

The symposium topics outlined in the symposium agenda, outlined through plenary and breakout presentations, and then refined into issues through working groups, also appear to be along the same lines as those being wrestled with at the various USG inter-agency MDA meetings of which OGMSA has been a part.

In preparing the summary report for GMISS 2008, OGMSA compared GMISS outcomes with the materials from other U.S. Government commercial outreach conferences and symposia, including:

- The Office of the Director of National Intelligence (ODNI) Protecting The Global Supply Chain Conference of June 2, 2008
- The Marcus-Evans Global Maritime Capabilities Conference of July 9, 2008: specifically remarks by Capt J. Stephen Maynard, USN, U.S. Naval War College entitled Integrating the Commercial Shipping Industry into A Cooperative Strategy for 21st Century
- The Maritime Information Sharing Taskforce (MIST) Symposium of August 20-21, 2008
- The U.S. Naval Forces Southern Command MARLU Conference of Sept 17-18, 2008
- The U.S. Naval War College Shipping Workshop of October 29, 2008

This comparison indicated a parallel trend of issues being brought forth by industry participants, regardless of venue, including:

- The need for the U.S. Government to speak a singular MDA message
- The need for coordination of U.S. Government maritime information requests with industry
- The need for a single portal to send requested data to for subsequent internal U.S. Government distribution
- The need for a cost/benefit analysis of data being requested or required
- The need for reciprocity on data requests
- The need for action towards mutually beneficial solutions.

=== GMISS 2008 Summary Report ===
The complete summary report from GMISS 2008 is available on OGMSA's Maritime Awareness Wiki.

== GMISS 2009 ==
GMISS 2009 is scheduled for September 15–17 at the National Defense University in Washington, DC.
