= USCGC Legare =

USCGC Legare has been the name of more than one United States Coast Guard ship, and may refer to:

- USCGC Legare (WSC-144), later WMEC-144, a patrol boat, later medium endurance cutter, in commission from 1927 to 1968
- USCGC Legare (WMEC-912), a medium endurance cutter in commission since 1990

== See also ==
- USRC Legare, a United States Revenue Cutter Service cutter in commission from 1844 to 1847
