= Transport accident =

A transport accident is any accident or incident that occurs during any type of transportation, including those occurring during road transport, rail transport, marine transport and air transport. It can refer to:

- a road traffic incident (including vehicle collision, pedestrian–bicycle collisions, pedestrian–pedestrian collisions etc.)
- a marine accident (sailing ship accident, including man overboard)
- railroad accidents (including train wreck)
- an aviation accident and incident

== Comparisons ==
There are three main ways in which risk of fatality of a certain mode of travel can be measured: Deaths per billion typical journeys taken, deaths per billion hours traveled, or deaths per billion kilometers traveled. The following table displays these statistics for the United Kingdom 1990–2000. Note that aviation safety does not include the transportation to the airport.

Type	Deaths per billion		
Type	Journeys	Hours	km
Bus	4.3	11.1	0.4
Rail	20	30	0.6
Van	20	60	1.2
Car	40	130	3.1
Foot	40	220	54.2
Water	90	50	2.6
Air	117	30.8	0.05
Pedal cycle	170	550	44.6
Motorcycle	1640	4840	108.9

== See also ==
- Category:Lists of motor vehicle deaths by year
- Road traffic safety
- Automotive safety
- Motorcycle safety
- Bicycle safety
- Category:Lists of railway accidents and incidents
- Category:Railway safety
- Marine accident investigation
- Category:Maritime safety
- Aviation safety
