= John A. Volpe National Transportation Systems Center =

United States government agency

Coordinates: 42°21′50.67″N 71°5′8.16″W

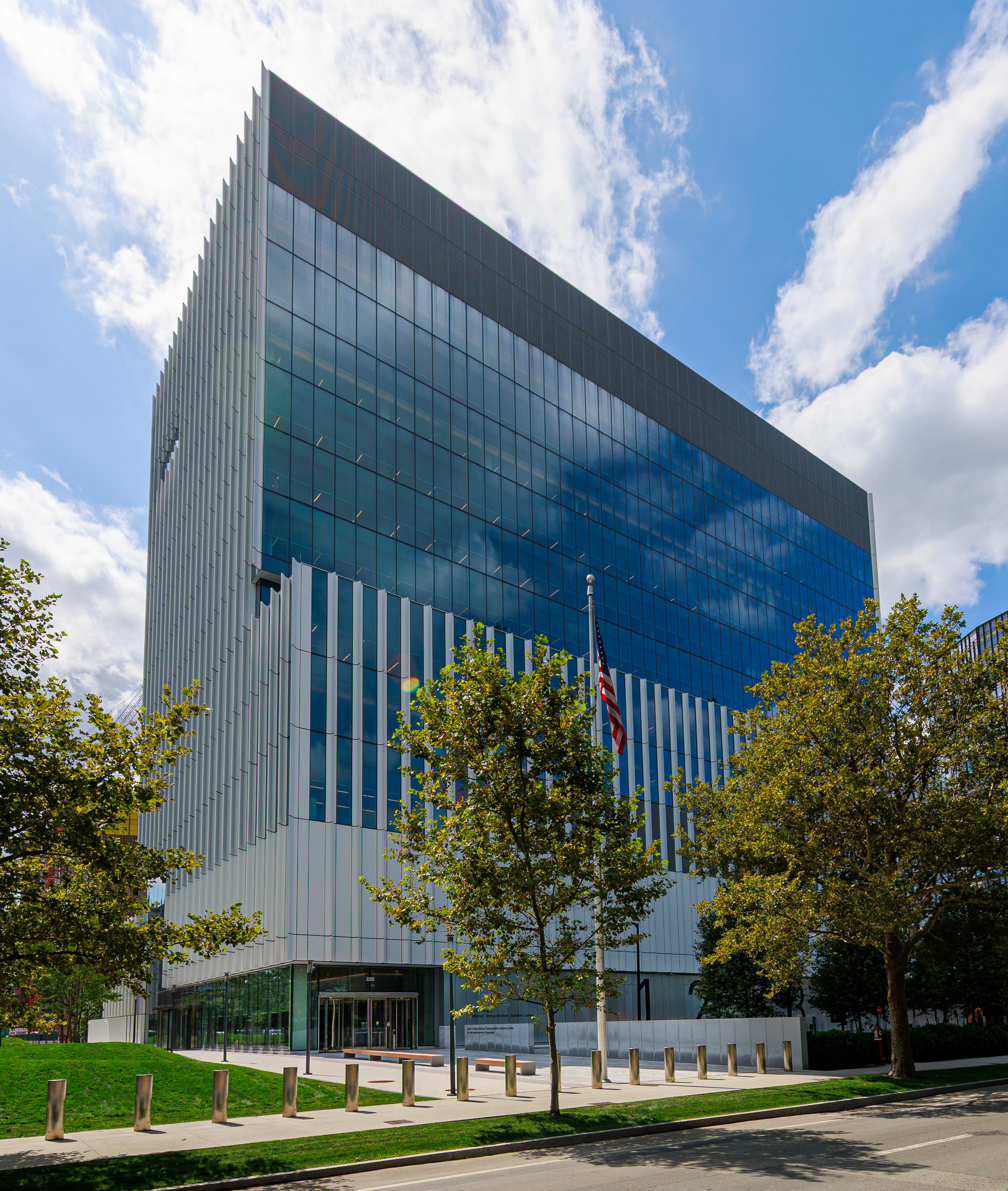
The new Volpe Center at 220 Binney Street

The John A. Volpe National Transportation Systems Center (colloquially, the Volpe Center) in Cambridge, Massachusetts, is a center of transportation and logistics in the United States Department of Transportation (USDOT).

The center's work includes projects that cut across traditional transportation modes and technical disciplines, including the Maritime Safety and Security Information System (MSSIS) and SeaVision; the Freight and Fuel Transportation Optimization Tool (FTOT); expertise and support of a Brand New Air Traffic Control System; Corporate Average Fuel Economy (CAFE); Positioning, Navigation, and Timing (PNT), Complementary PNT (CPNT), and Spectrum; Environmental Regulatory Reform and Streamlining; Artificial Intelligence (AI)/Machine Learning, Data Science, and Analytics; and other innovative areas of research and technology.

The U.S. DOT Volpe Center helps federal, state, and local governments, industry, and academia in various areas, including human factors research, system design, implementation and assessment, global tracking, strategic investment and resource allocation, environmental preservation, and organizational effectiveness.

The U.S. DOT Volpe Center differs from most federal organizations in that it receives no direct appropriation from Congress. Instead, its roughly $200 million annual budget is funded by fees for its work.

The center is named for John Volpe, a former Massachusetts governor and U.S. secretary of transportation.

== Location ==
The new U.S. DOT Volpe Center is located at 220 Binney Street in Cambridge, Massachusetts in the heart of Kendall Square across the Charles River from Boston, adjacent to the Massachusetts Institute of Technology (MIT), and near the Kendall/MIT MBTA Red Line subway stop.

== History ==
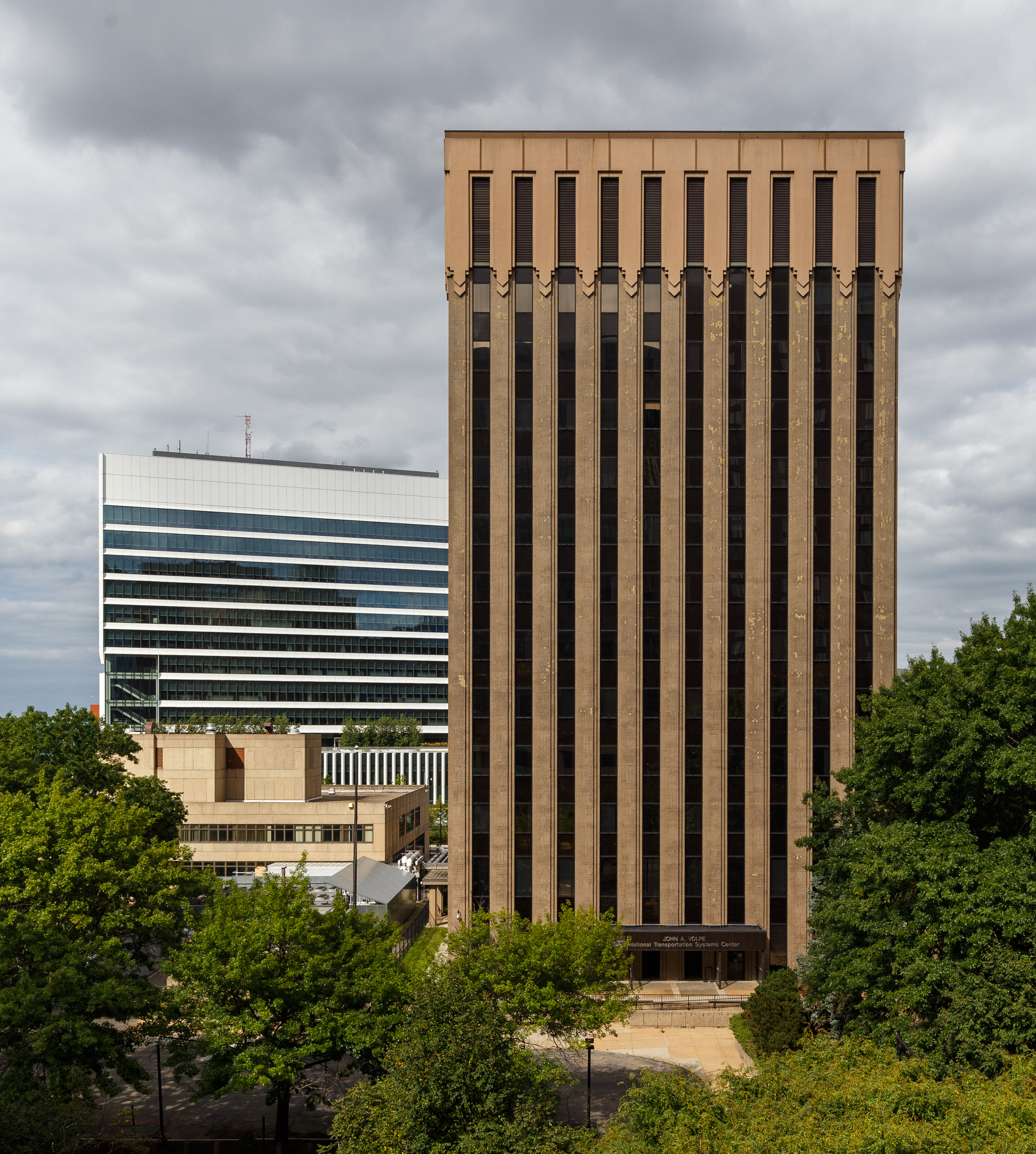
Foreground: The former building at 55 Broadway; Background: New home at 220 Binney Street

The older of the two main buildings on the former site were designated as the NASA Electronics Research Center. By direction of President John F. Kennedy after his pledge for the United States to go to the moon, it became the mission control center for all US space missions. Extensive work was completed within the main building and massive amounts of communications equipment and cabling was installed around the site, under the streets leading to it and in the countryside. When Kennedy was assassinated in November 1963, Vice President Lyndon B. Johnson, a Texan, was sworn in to take over the presidency. Within two months, all work on mission control in Massachusetts was halted and a new site was named in Houston. The Research Center was phased out and all of the communications installations were abandoned in place.

The U.S. DOT Volpe Center was renamed in 1990 in honor of the second U.S. secretary of transportation and governor of Massachusetts John A. Volpe. The U.S. DOT Volpe Center has served 19 secretaries of transportation, their deputies and assistant secretaries, and more than 300 modal administrators. The work of the U.S. DOT Volpe Center addresses complex transportation challenges facing the transportation industry and the nation, with specific emphasis on safety, innovation, and efficiency.

== Redevelopment ==
In January 2017, MIT signed an agreement with the U.S. General Services Administration (GSA) to redevelop the John A. Volpe National Transportation Systems Center, with the state aim of turning the 14-acre parcel into a more vibrant mixed-use site.

In October 2017, the Cambridge City Council approved MIT’s rezoning petition for the site and a team of architects and landscape planners have been working to imagine a new home for the Volpe Center.

== See also ==
- Aircraft Situation Display to Industry
