= SeaVision =

Government website to track and analyze maritime vessels and activity

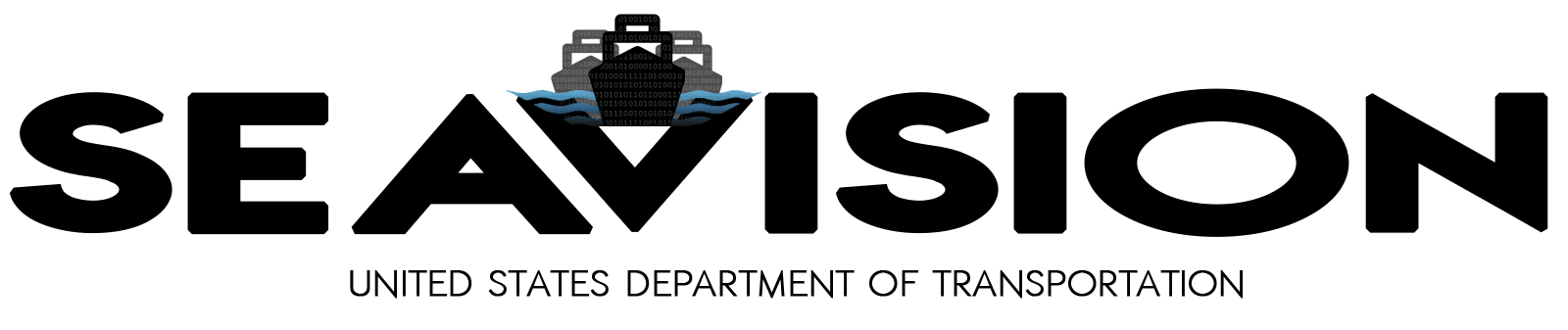
- US Department of Transportation SeaVision Logo
- Website type: Government
- Founded: 2012
- Headquarters: Cambridge, Massachusetts, {{{location_country}}}
- Country of origin: United States
- Creator: U.S. Department of Transportation
- Website: https://info.seavision.volpe.dot.gov/
- Launched: 2012
- Current status: Active

SeaVision is a web-based maritime situational awareness platform hosted by the United States Department of Transportation It is designed to support maritime operations, enhance security, and foster partnerships within the maritime community. The platform enables users to access and share diverse maritime information and incorporates rules-based analytics to monitor activities and generate alerts for predefined events. SeaVision is recognized for its cost-effectiveness and its ability to integrate and correlate data from multiple sources, making it a versatile tool for addressing a wide range of operational and mission-specific requirements but has been observed to have limitations due to its data quality and data availability.

== Background ==
SeaVision is a maritime domain awareness tool initially developed in 2012 by Brendon Providence at the U.S. Department of Transportation's John A. Volpe National Transportation Systems Center for U.S. Naval Forces Africa (NAVAF). It was later co-developed by the Naval Information Warfare Center Pacific (NIWC Pacific). Originally designed for maritime situational awareness, the platform has expanded into a globally utilized multinational information-sharing tool.

SeaVision serves as the primary tool employed by the Volpe Center to support NAVAF activities. NAVAF conducts four maritime domain awareness exercises annually, during which the Volpe Center provides technical support and assists participating countries in analyzing SeaVision data.

Since its launch, SeaVision has undergone continuous development and refinement, incorporating user feedback, technological advancements, and extensive improvements to its Automatic Identification System (AIS) capabilities. In 2018, a significant milestone was achieved when 20 African nations began contributing their data to the system, as noted by Henry Wychorski, an electronics engineer at the Volpe Center.

SeaVision has been utilized in several multinational exercises, including Obangame Express in March 2017 and the annual Southeast Asia Cooperation and Training (SEACAT) exercise in 2018, where it served as the primary tool.

As of January 2024, artificial intelligence algorithms have been integrated into SeaVision to process search and rescue data, enhancing its capabilities. In March 2024, Planet Labs Federal, a subsidiary of Planet Labs, was awarded a contract by NIWC-PAC to incorporate Planet's SkySat and PlanetScope data into the platform.

In April 2025, India enhanced its maritime domain awareness capabilities through a $131 million agreement with the United States to acquire HawkEye 360 technology. As part of the deal, India is incorporating HawkEye 360's satellite-based radio frequency (RF) detection data into SeaVision, which is capable of identifying “dark ships” that disable their AIS to avoid detection. This acquisition supports India's broader maritime security initiatives, including the Information Fusion Centre – Indian Ocean Region (IFC-IOR), and strengthens its role in regional collaborations such as the Quadrilateral Security Dialogue (QUAD). The NIWC-PAC Technical Assistance Field Team (TAFT) team will provide on-site SeaVision training and support. This deal aims to bolster India's maritime domain awareness, analytical capabilities, and strategic posture in the Indo-Pacific region, enhancing its ability to monitor vast maritime zones, deter illegal activities, and respond swiftly to potential threats.

== Capabilities ==
SeaVision is a web-based maritime visualization and information management tool designed to enhance maritime situational awareness. It enables users to view ship positions on a map, analyze historical movement patterns, and access unclassified data in near real-time through a shared data network. The platform is primarily used by the U.S. Department of the Navy and approved coalition partners, with access restricted to nations that contribute data to the system.

SeaVision integrates data from multiple sources, including coastal radar, satellite imaging, and government and commercial datasets. It incorporates information from systems such as the Maritime Safety and Security Information System (MSSIS), which shares Automatic Identification System (AIS) data among international partners. Additional data sources include satellite systems from NASA and NOAA, coastal radar networks, and Satellite Synthetic Aperture Radar (SAT-SAR).

The system also supports the integration of commercial datasets, such as Satellite Terrestrial AIS for global vessel tracking, Maritime Risk and Port Risk datasets for monitoring security incidents, and risk scores from Fairplay's World Registry of Ships. SeaVision tracks vessels, monitors Exclusive Economic Zones (EEZs), and identifies vessels of interest (VOIs) based on automated rules and risk assessments.

SeaVision provides additional analytical capabilities through the integration of data from Global Fishing Watch, offering insights into maritime vessel encounters and loitering behaviors. Its features include custom alerts, historical tracking, and vessel identification. The platform supports maritime safety and security efforts globally, with particular application in regions such as West Africa.

SeaVision operates on browsers such as Firefox and Internet Explorer 11 and is designed to address certain limitations of similar tools, such as high subscription costs and extensive storage or bandwidth requirements. Its unclassified structure supports data import/export and facilitates collaboration among international partners.

== Shortcomings and Limitations ==
SeaVision has certain limitations that have been identified:

- Dependence on Data Quality and Sharing: SeaVision's effectiveness is contingent upon the quality and timeliness of data from various sources, including the Automatic Identification System (AIS), satellite imagery, and radar. In regions where data collection infrastructure is underdeveloped or where data sharing among nations is inconsistent, SeaVision's ability to provide a comprehensive maritime picture can be compromised. For instance, during the Obangame Express 2024 exercise, the utility of SeaVision was directly linked to the input from partner and ally surface units across Western Africa, highlighting the necessity for robust data sharing protocols.
- Detection of Non-Cooperative Vessels: Vessels that do not transmit AIS signals, often referred to as "dark" vessels, pose a significant challenge. While SeaVision incorporates satellite electro-optical imagery to detect such vessels, its detection capabilities are limited by the availability and resolution of satellite data, as well as environmental factors like cloud cover. This limitation was acknowledged during the Obangame Express 2024 exercise, where the detection of non-cooperative vessels remained a critical concern.
- User Training and Analytical Proficiency: The transition from basic operation to advanced analytical use of SeaVision requires comprehensive training. Empowering users to effectively analyze information and generate actionable intelligence is essential. However, varying levels of technical expertise among users can hinder this transition, potentially limiting the tool's full potential. Efforts during exercises like Obangame Express 2024 have focused on enhancing analytical capabilities, but disparities in proficiency persist.
- Infrastructure and Resource Constraints: In regions with limited technological infrastructure or resources, implementing and maintaining SeaVision can be challenging. Developing nations may face difficulties in establishing the necessary hardware, software, and training programs, which can impede the system's effectiveness and sustainability.

== Impact ==
SeaVision is utilized by both military and non-military organizations to support maritime domain awareness (MDA). For example, in Kenya, local government agencies employ SeaVision to develop a more comprehensive understanding of maritime activities.

Kiruja Micheni, a project manager for the Djibouti Code of Conduct with the International Maritime Organization (IMO), has noted the role of SeaVision and regional exercises such as Cutlass Express in promoting collaboration among practitioners and nations. The United States Navy reports that these initiatives facilitate the exchange of experiences and best practices, strengthening the capacity of partner nations to address maritime security challenges by connecting regional centers.

== Development and Releases ==
SeaVision follows a development strategy focused on regular updates and iterative improvements to maintain application reliability and responsiveness to user needs. This strategy includes:

- Incremental Releases: Updates delivered on a quarterly basis that introduce new features, functionality, and enhancements informed by user requirements.
- Micro Releases: Smaller updates deployed as necessary to address critical issues or bug fixes.
