= Maritime domain awareness =

Maritime security effort

Maritime domain awareness (MDA) is defined by the International Maritime Organization as the effective understanding of anything associated with the maritime domain that could impact the security, safety, economy, or environment. MDA is said to work as a ‘key enabler’ for other maritime security issues, such as anti-piracy patrols, in the way that in order to do effective patrols you need to have the ability of conducting effective MDA. The maritime domain is defined as all areas and things of, on, under, relating to, adjacent to, or bordering on a sea, ocean, or other navigable waterway, including all maritime-related activities, infrastructure, people, cargo, and vessels and other conveyances.

Countries have always gathered information about the maritime environment, in order to generate intelligence necessary for various missions or finding enemy navies. Modern MDA however, was defined in the aftermath of the 9/11 terror attack and the terror attack on the destroyer USS Cole. Maritime Domain Awareness programs aims to detect threats and come up with resolutions to these; helping with decision-making for different threats and; inspects that international law are kept, in order to ensure freedom of navigation.

Different agents conducts MDA, the most important being Maritime Domain Awareness Centers or Maritime Domain Awareness Fusion Centers. Maritime Domain Awareness Centers can have different areas of studies, regional, crime, military threats etc. These centers gather the information, fuse it together and analyze the data in order to spot trends and patterns. The data gathered is useful for different things such as; law enforcement, governance and capacity building.

The automatic identification system (AIS) is one of the most important sources of data for the MDA agencies. AIS is used in order for ships to know each other’s whereabouts, they transmit a signal from ship to ship and to shore. Lately, the system has been developed into satellite system, so called satellite AIS, which makes the system more effective. All ocean-going vessels above 300 tons, are supposed to use and transmit via AIS according to the International Maritime Organisation. The satellite constellations help facilitate this with "tip and cue" methodologies (Cudzilo et al., 2012: 1).

Underwater domain awareness (UDA) is the aspect of maritime domain awareness focused on the underwater sector. There is a military requirement, but also a need to monitor undersea geophysical activity which can provide vital clues to minimize the impact of devastating natural disasters.

== Canada ==
In Canada, the 2004 National Security Policy resulted in establishment of Marine Security Operations Centres (MSOCs) responsible for supporting a national response to maritime security threats. The East Coast MSOC is in Halifax, the West Coast MSOC in Victoria, and the Great Lakes and St. Lawrence Seaway MSOC in Niagara.

== European Union ==
The European Union took a decision in 2008 to improve the integration and interoperability of member states' maritime safety, security, border control, environmental protection, fisheries and law enforcement systems in order to create a Common Information Sharing Environment for the EU maritime domain.

=== Denmark ===
The maritime domain of Denmark encompasses the maritime domain of the entire Danish Realm, which aside from Denmark includes the Faroe Islands in the North Atlantic and Greenland. The kingdom of Denmark has a large maritime domain relative to its population size, maintaining the worlds 15th largest EEZ compared to the 112th largest population, a domain which is also economically and geopolitically important in several ways. The Danish Straits connect the Baltic Sea to the open ocean, with a total number of approximately 70.000 ships transiting the Great Belt and the Oeresund every year. Greenland and the Faroe Islands sit astride the strategically important GIUK Gap, and the Danish part of the Arctic Ocean is of increasing importance as geopolitical tensions rise and sea ice melts.

In Denmark, MDA is organized mainly by the Royal Danish Navy. Surveillance of Danish waters is achieved by the DIANA-class patrol vessels, Naval Home Guard, Danish Fishing Authority, Air Force helicopters and a number of coastal surveillance stations. In Oeresund, Great Belt and Fehmarn Belt maritime traffic is controlled by the Vessel Traffic Service systems and information is fused and analyzed by the National Maritime Operations Center. The National Maritime Operations Center also acts as national Joint Rescue Coordination Center and operates the Maritime Assistance Service, which is connected to the EU-based SafeSeaNe.t

In the Faroe Islands and Greenland, MDA is achieved mainly by Joint Arctic Command of the Danish Defence. Surveillance is achieved by the Royal Danish Navy THETIS-class and KNUD RASMUSSEN-class OPVs as well as Royal Danish Air Force MH60R Sea Hawk helicopters and Challenger aircraft, and information is fused and analyzed by the Joint Rescue Coordination Center of the Joint Arctic Command.

A number of challenges exist to Danish maritime domain awareness. In the Danish Straits, which have ideal operating conditions for submarines, underwater domain awareness is very limited, and the sheer size of the arctic and north Atlantic parts of the Danish maritime domain makes comprehensive maritime domain awareness very difficult. Furthermore, the navy ships patrolling both areas are deemed outdated and increasingly unfit for the task.

In Greenland the Danish navy is building up its capabilities over the coming years, in 2021 the Mette Frederiksen Government together with Venstre, Danish Peoples’s Party, Danish Social Liberal Party, Conservative Peoples’s Party and Liberal Alliance, increased the budget with further 1.5 billion DKK. These new capabilities includes drones, education, analyst center, satellite surveillance and radar systems. The purpose is to give the navy better capabilities to support the civil society in SAR missions, environment surveillance, fishery control, research etc. The agreement also accommodates wishes from NATO, that Denmark should acquire long range drones for surveillance of the ocean.

In light of the deteriorating security situation following Russia’s 2022 invasion of Ukraine, the Mette Frederiksen Government has announced a further increase in defense spending towards 2% of GDP in 2033. While the details of the surge in spending are still being negotiated, plans are in motion to replace both the THETIS-class and DIANA-class with more modern and capable vessels as well as procurement of towed-array sonar to increase underwater awareness capabilities for the ABSALON-class frigates.

== India ==
The Modi led BJP Govt had promised to set up a National Maritime Authority (NMA) of India in their 2014 election manifesto to ensure cohesive policy-making and effective coordination on coastal security among the multiple authorities dealing with maritime issues in the country. But the proposal for the same is yet to see daylight. However post 26/11 a slew of coastal security measures have been taken, from a fledgling coastal radar network to state marine police stations and NMA. The 15 or more agencies involved, ranging from Navy, Coast Guard, customs, intelligence agencies and port authorities to the home and shipping ministries, state governments and fisheries departments, often work at cross-purposes. A full-time federal body like NMA is needed to clear the clutter. The National Maritime Domain Awareness (NMDA) Project of India, an integrated intelligence grid to detect and tackle threats emanating from the sea in real-time has been established to generate a common operational picture of activities at sea through an institutionalised mechanism for collecting, fusing and analysing information from technical and other sources like coastal surveillance network radars, space-based automatic identification systems, vessel traffic management systems, fishing vessel registration and fishermen biometric identity databases.

India has a coastal surveillance radar systems (CSRS) network with radar across India, Seychelles and Mauritius and Sri Lanka. As of January 2019, India is in advanced discussions with Myanmar to install similar radar systems there, and has also offered these systems to Bangladesh, Indonesia, Thailand and Maldives. While India handles most of the Maldive's maritime security, Sri Lanka has also established its own operations.

== Western Indian Ocean ==
Comoros, France, Madagascar, Mauritius and the Seychelles work together on maritime security in the western Indian Ocean. In 2018 they established a Regional Maritime Information Fusion Centre in Madagascar, which also cooperates with Djibouti and Kenya. A Regional Combined Operations Centre has been established in the Seychelles, which also cooperates with Somalia and Tanzania.

== Philippines ==
In the Philippines, the National Coast Watch System (NCWS) was originally designed to improve maritime domain awareness in the Sulu and Celebes Seas, but has been extended over the entire island country's territory.

== Red Sea ==
In light of the Red Sea crisis, efforts have been made to increase maritime security in the region. The 2024 EUNAVFOR ASPIDES operation launched by the EU seeks, in part, to provide “maritime situational awareness” to regional partners to counter Houthi attacks on merchant vessels. This entails threat assessment and monitoring as well as information sharing to regional partners and parallel operations such as EUNAVFOR ATALANTA.

The operation’s MDA objectives are carried out by three Frigates (Chevalier Paul and Forbin of the French Navy, and Psara of the Hellenic Navy) and one Destroyer class ship (Andrea Doria of the Italian Navy). They also combine both military and civilian assets from the European headquarter in Larissa, Greece, and Force headquarter that is embarked on the Frigates. It acts in accordance with the EU’s Common Security and Defence Policy.

== South Africa ==
In March 2012, the South African Navy announce the establishment of two MDA centers, one in Cape Town for the west coast and one in Durban to cover the east coast.

== United States ==
In the United States, the secretary of the Navy is the DoD Executive Agent for maritime domain awareness.

For private ports, The Mariner Group's CommandBridge platform is the market leader in Maritime Domain Awareness Systems.

== The South Pacific ==
The South Pacific spans over a vast geographical area, with very large EEZ’s and not a lot of capabilities to patrol the waters Thus, maritime domain awareness activities are important to effectively exert sovereignty on the oceans, as recognized by the Pacific Islands Forum (PIF), in 2017. Many initiatives like the Pacific Fusion Centre are run on a mandate through the Pacific Islands Forum. The Pacific Fusion Centre is in Vanuatu. It was Established through the PIF, based on the strategic objectives of the Boe Declaration of 2018. The Pacific Fusion Centre does strategic assessments, information sharing, capacity building through training and domain awareness for a lot of the pacific. Initiatives like the Regional Fisheries Surveillance Centre also plays a vital role in gaining maritime domain awareness for the smaller island states. Through funding from Australia, the FFA has also partnered with a leading actor in satellite surveillance, Hawkeye 360, in a pilot programme to provide greater MDA in combatting IUU Fishing.

== Australia ==
The main actor, doing maritime domain awareness in the South Pacific is Australia. Australia has assumed a regional leadership position with the Pacific Maritime Security Programme (PMSP), where they have pledged to deliver 24 guardian-class ships to other Pacific Island states, as well as infrastructure and maintenance of said guardian-class ships. Furthermore, they announced an Enhanced Areial Surveillance Programme (EASP) in connection with the PMSP, to increase maritime domain awareness in the region and allow for targeted, intelligence-driven law enforcement at sea. Through Partnerships like the Partners of the Blue Pacific, Australia has also furthered the agenda of MDA in the pacific. The Quad partnership of the U.S., Australia, Japan & India, have launched the Indo-Pacific Partnership for Maritime Domain Awareness, building on radiofrequency technology. The programme will include the launching of regional information centres to establish “a common operating picture”. The programme will work through an updated version of SeaVision, combined with the Hawkeye 360 satellite programme, which allows for comparison between data, to identify “dark” vessels who have tampered with their AIS system. The development of new technology like the HSOR also helps leapfrog the capabilities in gaining domain awareness and identifying dark vessels. This development, in combination with the PMSP initiative provides greater capabilities of the individual Pacific Island states to police their own waters.

== See also ==
- Indo-Pacific Maritime Surveillance Collaboration
- Maritime power
- Situation awareness military training methods
