= For-Site Foundation =

- Formation: 2003
- Type: non profit organization
- Locations: San Francisco; Nevada City, California

The For-Site Foundation, established in 2003, is a nonprofit organization dedicated to creating collaborative art about place. Based in both San Francisco and Nevada City, California, For-Site collaborates with artists and national parks to create site-specific works of all media. Its work includes site-specific projects often completed at inaccessible sites in the Bay Area, including Alcatraz and the Presidio, and a residency program and educational partnerships that both take place on their 50-acre site in Nevada City. Gallerist Cheryl Haines founded For-Site in 2003.

== Selected works ==
=== @Large: Ai Weiwei on Alcatraz ===
For-Site Foundation's installation "@Large: Ai Weiwei on Alcatraz," was an "unprecedented exhibition" that ran within Alcatraz prison from September 27, 2014, to April 26, 2015. Ai Weiwei, restricted from leaving China since 2011, was unable to be onsite for installation and thus the project was a collaboration between him and Haines as curator. Haines, speaking about the show, said "one of the basic themes of this exhibition is 'what is freedom?'" The installation had seven parts, With Wind, Trace, Refraction, Stay Tuned, Illumination, Blossom, and Yours Truly. "With Wind" is a huge traditional Chinese dragon kite, weaving its way in and out of pillars in one of Alcatraz's frames of a hall, its body holding names of imprisoned and exiled activists. Haines spoke about the kite in "With Wind," "It will be flying, it will be free, but it will also be restricted in the building, so it's this really interesting conversation between control and freedom." The installation created a point of access to many of the prison's spaces that visitors are not usually able to enter, reinforcing ideas of control, detainment, and freedom through a collaboration with Alcatraz as a site. The project went on to be featured in the feature documentary, Ai Weiwei: Yours Truly, which was produced by the FOR-SITE Foundation and debuted as a world premiere in 2019 at the San Francisco International Film Festival.

=== Cornelia Parker ===
Cornelia Parker was the first artist to complete the FOR-SITE Foundation residency established in 2004. There, she developed a sequel to Mass (Colder Darker Matter) (1997) The work was presented at Yerba Buena Center for the Arts's Risk and Response series during its 2005/2006 season.
