= Chelsea Manning =

American activist and whistleblower (born 1987)

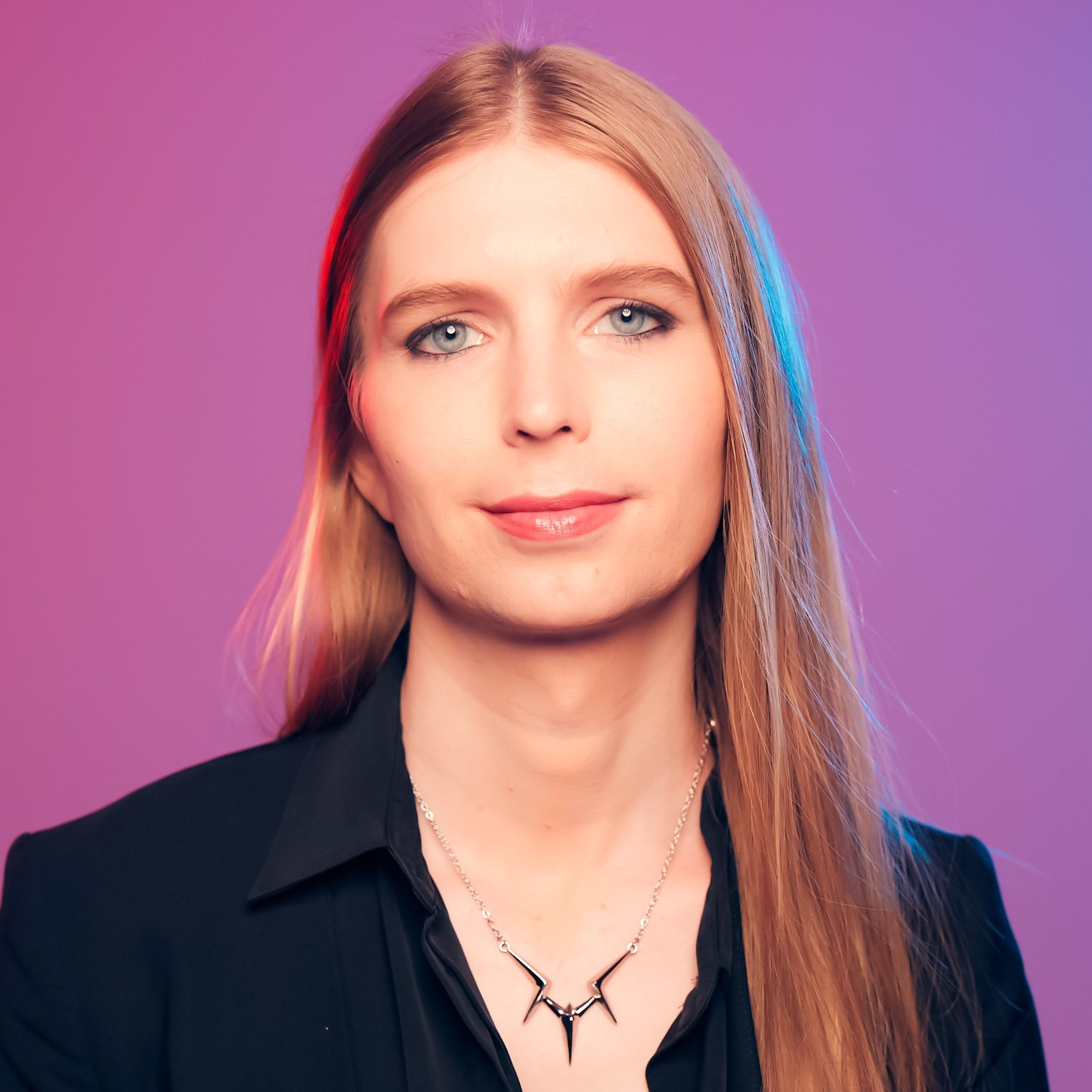
- Manning in 2022
- Born: Bradley Edward Manning; December 17, 1987 (age 38); Oklahoma City, U.S.
- Known for: Classified document disclosure to WikiLeaks
- Political party: Democratic
- Criminal charges: Violating the Espionage Act, stealing government property, violation of the Computer Fraud and Abuse Act, multiple counts of disobeying orders
- Criminal penalty: 35 years imprisonment (commuted to 7 years total confinement), reduction in rank to private (E-1 or Pvt), forfeiture of all pay and allowances, dishonorable discharge
- Military career
- Branch: United States Army
- Service years: Active duty: 2007–2010; Confinement: 2010–2017
- Rank: Private (formerly Specialist)
- Units: 2nd BCT, 10th Mountain Division (former)
- Awards: National Defense Service Medal; Global War on Terrorism Service Medal; Army Service Ribbon; Overseas Service Ribbon; Iraq Campaign Medal

Chelsea Elizabeth Manning (born Bradley Edward Manning, December 17, 1987) is an American activist and whistleblower. She is a former United States Army soldier who was convicted by court-martial in July 2013 of violations of the Espionage Act and other offenses, after disclosing to WikiLeaks nearly 750,000 classified, or unclassified but sensitive, military and diplomatic documents on US war crimes in Iraq and Afghanistan. She was imprisoned from 2010 until 2017, when President Barack Obama commuted her sentence. Manning, a trans woman, said in 2013 that she had had a female gender identity since childhood and wanted to be known as Chelsea Manning.

Assigned in 2009 as an intelligence analyst to an Army unit in Iraq, Manning had access to classified databases. In early 2010, she leaked classified information to WikiLeaks and confided this to Adrian Lamo, an online acquaintance. Lamo indirectly informed the Army's Criminal Investigation Command, and Manning was arrested in May 2010. The material included videos of the July 12, 2007, Baghdad airstrike and the 2009 Granai airstrike in Afghanistan; 251,287 US diplomatic cables; and 482,832 Army reports that came to be known as the "Iraq War Logs" and "Afghan War Diary". WikiLeaks and its media partners published the material between April 2010 and April 2011.

Manning was charged with 22 offenses, including aiding the enemy, which was the most serious charge and could have resulted in a death sentence. She was held at the Marine Corps Brig, Quantico, in Virginia, from July 2010 to April 2011, under prevention-of-injury status—which entailed de facto solitary confinement and other restrictions that caused domestic and international concern—before being transferred to the Midwest Joint Regional Correctional Facility at Fort Leavenworth, Kansas, where she could interact with other detainees. In February 2013, she pleaded guilty to 10 of the charges. The trial on the remaining charges began on June 3, 2013, and on July 30, she was convicted of 17 of the original charges and amended versions of four others, but acquitted of aiding the enemy. She was sentenced to 35 years at the maximum-security US Disciplinary Barracks at Fort Leavenworth. On January 17, 2017, Obama commuted Manning's sentence to the nearly seven years of confinement dating from her arrest in 2010. Since her release, Manning has made her living through speaking engagements.

In 2018, Manning challenged incumbent senator Ben Cardin for the Democratic nomination for the United States Senate election in her home state of Maryland. She received 5.8% of the vote; Cardin won renomination with 80.4%.

Manning was jailed for contempt from March 8, 2019, to March 12, 2020, and fined $256,000 for refusing to testify before a grand jury investigating WikiLeaks founder Julian Assange.

== Background ==
=== Early life ===
Born in 1987 in Oklahoma City, Oklahoma, Manning is the second child of Susan Fox, who is Welsh, and Brian Manning, an American. Brian had joined the United States Navy in 1974, at age 19, and served five years as an intelligence analyst. He met Susan while stationed in Wales at RAF Brawdy. Manning has an older sister. The couple returned to the U.S. in 1979, settling first in California. After moving near Crescent, Oklahoma, they bought a house with five acres of land, where they kept pigs and chickens.

Manning's sister told the court-martial that both their parents were alcoholics, and that their mother drank continually while pregnant with Chelsea. Captain David Moulton, a Navy psychiatrist, told the court that Manning's facial features showed signs of fetal alcohol syndrome. The sister became Manning's principal caregiver, waking at night to prepare the baby's bottle. The court heard that Manning was fed only milk and baby food until the age of two. As an adult she reached 5 ft 2 in (1.57 m) and weighed around 105 pounds (48 kg).

Manning's father took a job as an information technology (IT) manager for a rental car agency, The Hertz Corporation, which required travel. The family lived several miles out of town, and Manning's mother was unable to drive. She spent her days drinking, while Manning was left largely to herself playing with Lego toys or on the computer. Brian stocked up on food before his trips and left signed checks that the sister mailed to pay the bills. A neighbor said that whenever Manning's elementary school went on field trips, she would give her own son extra food or money so he could make sure Manning had something to eat. Friends and neighbors considered the Mannings a troubled family.

=== Parents' divorce, move to Wales ===
As a child, Manning was opinionated about the intersection of religion and politics. For example, she invariably remained silent during the part of the Pledge of Allegiance that makes reference to God.

In a 2011 interview, Manning's father said that Manning "had a happy life growing up". He also said that Manning excelled at the saxophone, science, and computers, and created a website at the age of 10.

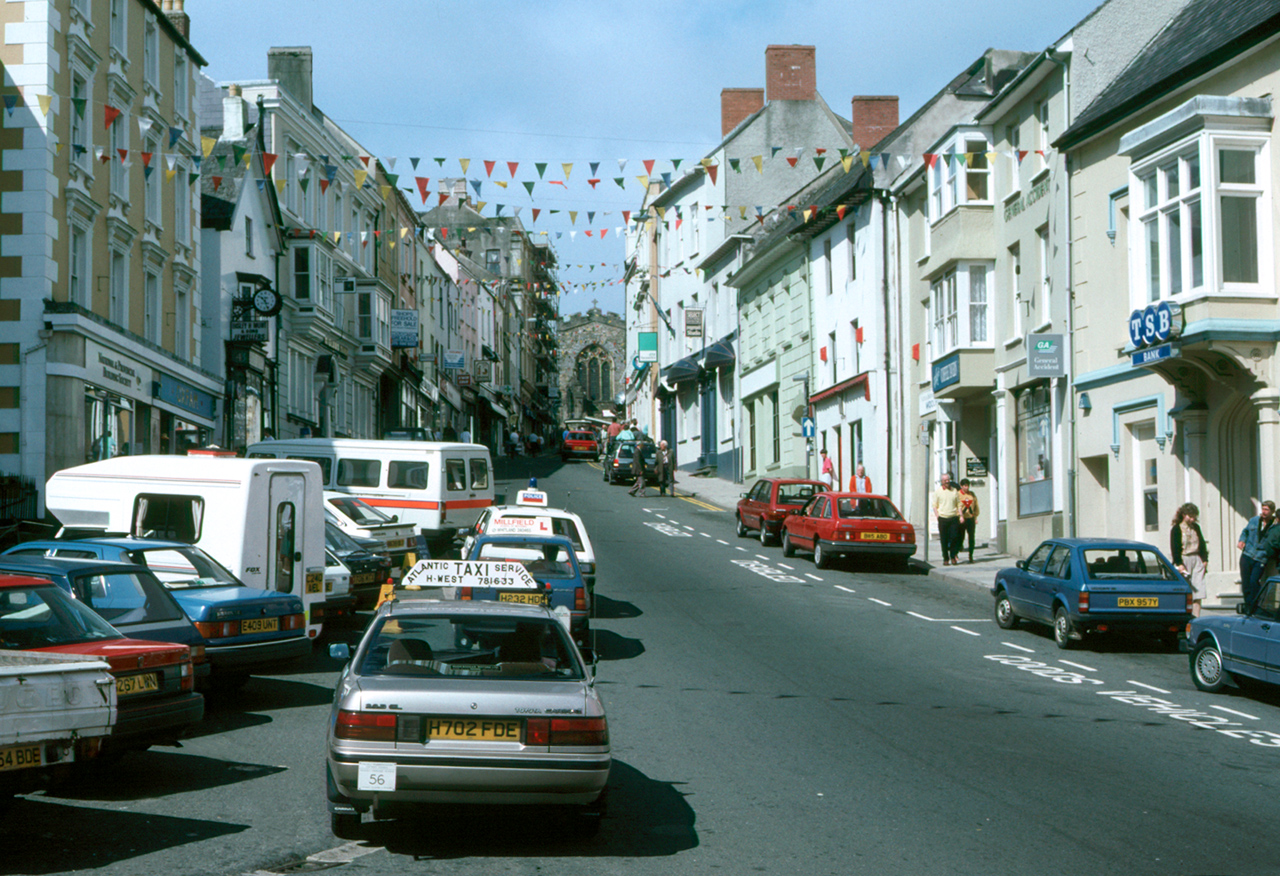
Haverfordwest, Wales, where Manning went to secondary school

A childhood friend of Manning's, speaking about a conversation they had when Manning was 13, said that Manning had identified as gay. The friend also said that Manning's home life was not good and that Manning's father was very controlling.

Around this time, Manning's parents divorced. She and her mother, Susan, moved out of the house to a rented apartment in Crescent, Oklahoma. Susan's instability continued, and in 1998 she attempted suicide; Manning's sister drove their mother to the hospital, with the 11-year-old Manning sitting in the back of the car trying to make sure their mother was still breathing.

Manning's father remarried in 2000, the same year as his divorce. His new wife, also named Susan, had a son from a previous relationship. When the son changed his surname to Manning too, Chelsea felt rejected, telling her mother, "I'm nobody now, Mom."

In November 2001, aged 14, Manning and her mother left the U.S., moving to Haverfordwest, Wales, where her mother had family. Manning attended the town's Tasker Milward secondary school. A school friend there told Ed Caesar for The Sunday Times that Manning's personality was "unique, extremely unique. Very quirky, very opinionated, very political, very clever, very articulate." Manning's interest in computers continued, and in 2003, she and a friend, James Kirkpatrick, set up an online message board, angeldyne.com, that offered games and music downloads.

The only American at school, and viewed as effeminate, Manning was bullied. In Oklahoma, Manning had come out to a few friends as gay, but was not open about it at school in Wales.

The students at her school frequently mocked her accent. Once, they abandoned her during a camping trip. Her aunt told The Washington Post that Manning had awoken to an empty campsite after the other campers had left without her.

=== Return to the U.S. ===
After completing high school in 2005 at age 17 and fearing her mother was becoming too ill to cope, Manning returned to the U.S. She moved in with her father, then living in Oklahoma City with his second wife and her child. Manning landed employment as a developer for the software company Zoto. She was apparently happy there, but was let go after four months. Her boss told The Washington Post that on a few occasions Manning had "just locked up" and would simply sit and stare, and in the end, communication became too difficult. The boss told the newspaper that "nobody's been taking care of this kid for a really long time."

By then, Manning was living as an openly gay man. Her relationship with her father was apparently good, but there were problems between Manning and her stepmother. In March 2006, Manning reportedly threatened her stepmother with a knife during an argument about Manning's failure to get another job; her stepmother called the police, and Manning was asked to leave the house. Manning drove to Tulsa in a pickup truck her father had given her. At first she slept in it, before moving in with a friend from school. The two got jobs at Incredible Pizza in April. Manning moved on to Chicago before running out of money and again having nowhere to stay. Her mother arranged for Brian's sister, Debra, a lawyer in Potomac, Maryland, to take Manning in. American journalist and Manning biographer Denver Nicks wrote that the 15 months Manning spent with her aunt were among the stablest of her life. Manning had a boyfriend, took several low-paid jobs, and spent a semester studying history and English at Montgomery College but left after failing an exam.

== Military service ==
=== Enlisting ===
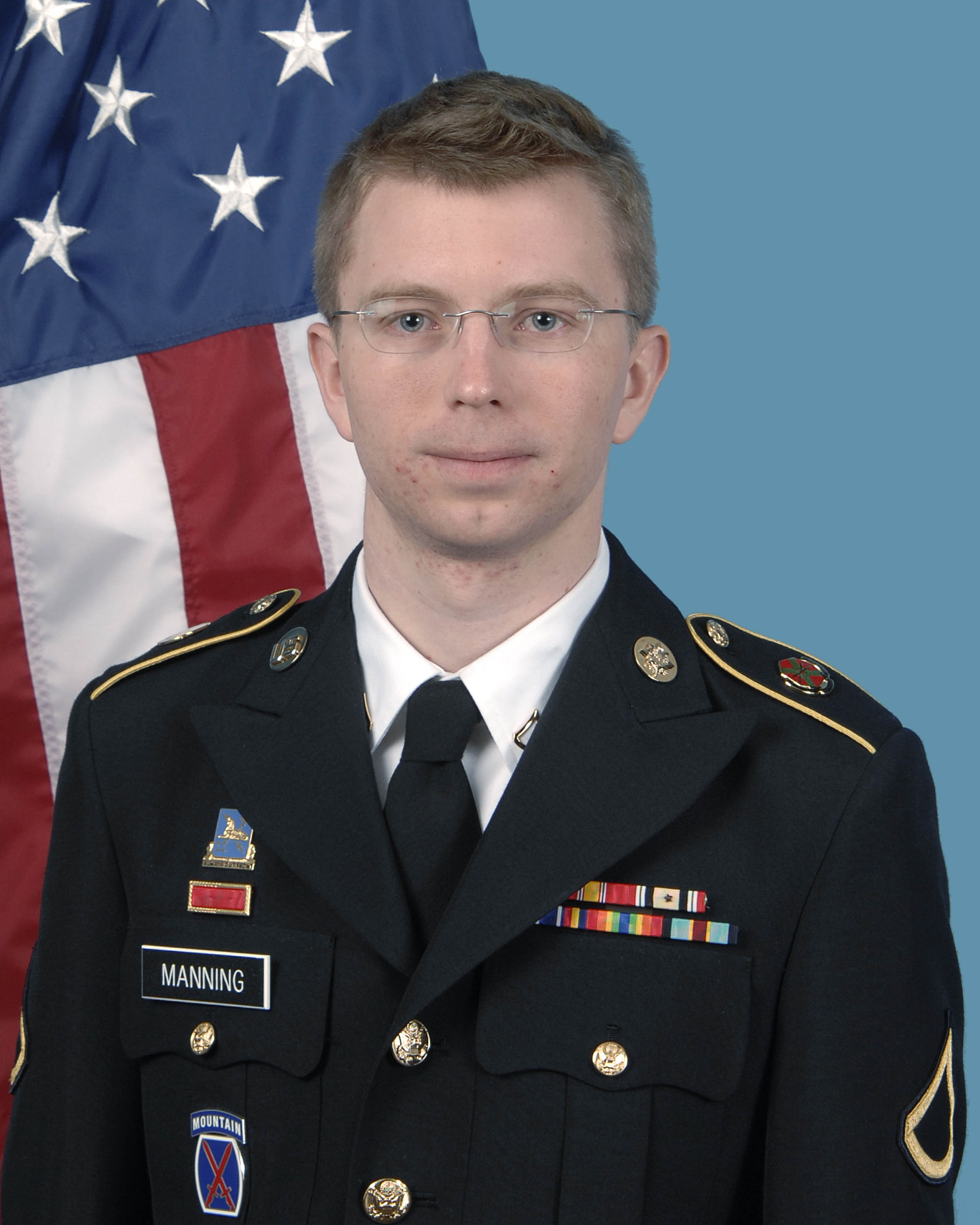
Manning in 2012

Manning's father spent weeks in 2007 asking her to consider joining the Army. Hoping to gain a college education through the G.I. Bill, and perhaps to study for a PhD in physics, she enlisted in September that year, after taking the Armed Services Vocational Aptitude Battery with a score that allowed her to join any Military Occupational Specialty post. She told her Army supervisor later that she had also hoped joining such a masculine environment would resolve her gender dysphoria.

Manning began basic training at Fort Leonard Wood, Missouri, on October 2, 2007. She wrote that she soon realized she was neither physically nor mentally prepared for it. Six weeks after enlisting, she was sent to the discharge unit. She was allegedly being bullied, and according to another soldier, was having a breakdown. The soldier told The Guardian: "The kid was barely five foot ... [She] was a runt, so pick on [her]. [She's] crazy, pick on [her]. [She's] a faggot, pick on [her]. The [girl] took it from every side. [She] couldn't please anyone." Nicks writes that Manning, who was used to being bullied, fought back—if the drill sergeants screamed at her, she would scream at them—to the point where they started calling her "General Manning".

The decision to discharge her was revoked, and she started basic training again in January 2008. After graduating in April, she moved to Fort Huachuca, Arizona, to attend Advanced Individual Training (AIT) for Military Occupational Specialty (MOS) 35F, intelligence analyst, receiving a TS/SCI security clearance (Top Secret/Sensitive Compartmented Information). According to Nicks, this security clearance, combined with the digitization of classified information and the government's policy of sharing it widely, gave Manning access to an unprecedented amount of material. Nicks writes that Manning was reprimanded while at Fort Huachuca for posting three video messages to friends on YouTube in which she described the inside of the Sensitive Compartmented Information Facility (SCIF) where she worked. Upon completion of her initial MOS course, Manning received the Army Service Ribbon and the National Defense Service Medal.

=== Move to Fort Drum, deployment to Iraq ===
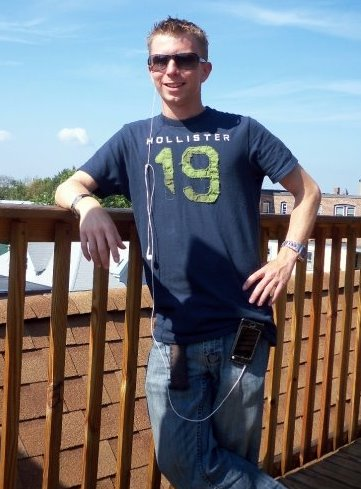
Manning in September 2009

In August 2008, Manning was sent to Fort Drum in Jefferson County, New York, where she joined the 2nd Brigade Combat Team, 10th Mountain Division, and trained for deployment to Iraq.

Back at Fort Drum, she continued to display emotional problems and by August 2009 had been referred to an Army mental-health counselor. During her time there as an intelligence analyst, she had unlimited access to the CIDNE-I (Iraq) and CIDNE-A (Afghanistan) databases. The CIDNE system contains data used by the Department of Defense and operated as the United States Central Command reporting tool for operations in Iraq and Afghanistan, including millions of vetted directories in various intelligence objectives, such as Human Intelligence, Psychological Operations, and Targeting Reports.

After four weeks at the Joint Readiness Training Center (JRTC) in Fort Polk, Louisiana, Manning was deployed to Forward Operating Base Hammer, near Baghdad, arriving in October 2009. From her workstation there, she had access to SIPRNet (the Secret Internet Protocol Router Network) and JWICS (the Joint Worldwide Intelligence Communications System). Two of her superiors had discussed not taking her to Iraq; it was felt she was a risk to herself and possibly others, according to a statement the Army later issued—but the shortage of intelligence analysts dictated their decision to take her. In November 2009, she was promoted from Private First Class to Specialist.

Manning was by all accounts unhappy and isolated. Because of the military's "Don't ask, don't tell" (DADT) policy (in effect until September 20, 2011), she was unable to live as an openly gay man without risk of being discharged. Manning's working conditions in the military included 14- to 15-hour night shifts in a tightly packed, dimly lit room.

On December 20, 2009, during a counseling session with two colleagues to discuss her poor time-keeping, Manning was told she would lose her one day off a week for persistent lateness. She responded by overturning a table, damaging a computer that was sitting on it. A sergeant moved Manning away from the weapons rack, and other soldiers pinned her arms behind her back and dragged her out of the room. Several witnesses to the incident believed her access to sensitive material ought to have been withdrawn at that point. The next month, January 2010, she began posting on Facebook that she felt hopeless and alone.

=== Release of material to WikiLeaks ===
Manning said her first contact with WikiLeaks was in January 2010, when she began to interact with them on IRC and Jabber. She had first noticed them toward the end of November 2009, when they posted 570,000 pager messages from the September 11 attacks.

Items of historic significance of two wars Iraq and Afghanistan Significant Activity, Sigacts, between 0001 January 2004 and 2359 31 December 2009 extracts from CSV documents from the Department of Defense and CDNE database.

These items have already been sanitized of any source identifying information.

You might need to sit on this information for 90 to 180 days to best send and distribute such a large amount of data to a large audience and protect the source.

This is one of the most significant documents of our time removing the fog of war and revealing the true nature of 21st century asymmetric warfare.

Have a good day.

— Manning, January 9, 2010

On January 5, 2010, Manning downloaded the 400,000 documents that became known as the Iraq War logs. On January 8, she downloaded 91,000 documents from the Afghanistan database, later known as part of the Afghan War logs. She saved the material on a CD-RW and smuggled it through security by labeling the CD-RW media "Lady Gaga" and storing it in a Gaga CD case. She lip-synced to Lady Gaga music to make it appear that she was using the classified computer's CD player to listen to music. She then copied it onto her personal computer. The next day, she wrote a message in a readme.txt file, which she told the court was initially intended for The Washington Post.

Manning copied the files from her laptop to an SD card for her camera so that she could take it with her to the U.S. while on R&R leave. Army investigators later found the card in Manning's room in her aunt's home in Potomac, Maryland. On January 23, Manning flew to the U.S. via Germany for two weeks of leave. It was during this visit that she first went out dressed as a woman, wearing a wig and makeup. After her arrest, Manning's friend Tyler Watkins told Wired that Manning had said during the visit that she had found some sensitive information and was considering leaking it. In 2021, Manning said that while home on leave in 2010, she had reached out to her then-Congressman, Chris Van Hollen, but got no response.

Manning contacted The Washington Post and The New York Times to ask whether they were interested in the material; the Post reporter did not sound interested, and the Times did not return the call. Manning decided to give it to WikiLeaks, and on February 3 sent them the Iraq and Afghan War logs via Tor. She returned to Iraq on February 11, with no acknowledgment from WikiLeaks that they had received the files.

On or around February 18, she passed WikiLeaks a diplomatic cable, dated January 13, 2010, from the U.S. Embassy in Reykjavík, Iceland. They published it within hours, which suggested to Manning that they had received the other material, too. She found the Baghdad helicopter attack ("Collateral murder") video in a Judge Advocate's directory and passed it to WikiLeaks on or around February 21. In late March, she sent them a video of the May 2009 Granai airstrike in Afghanistan; this was the video later removed and apparently destroyed by Daniel Domscheit-Berg when he left the organization. (Note: WikiLeaks tweeted on January 8, 2010, that they had obtained "encrypted videos of U.S. bomb strikes on civilians", and linked to a story about the airstrike; see "Have encrypted videos ...", Twitter, January 8, 2010 (archived from the original, May 8, 2012). The tweet said: "Have encrypted videos of US bomb strikes on civilians http://bit.ly/wlafghan2 we need super computer time http://ljsf.org/". Bit.ly is on Wikipedia's spam blacklist, which is why the first link is not live. It leads to Shachtman, Noah. "Afghan Airstrike Video Goes Down the Memory Hole", Wired, June 23, 2009.) Between March 28 and April 9, she downloaded the 250,000 diplomatic cables and on April 10, uploaded them to a WikiLeaks dropbox.

Manning told the court that, during her interaction with WikiLeaks on IRC and Jabber, she developed a friendship with someone there, believed to be Julian Assange (although neither knew the other's name), which she said made her feel she could be herself. Army investigators found 14 to 15 pages of encrypted chats, in unallocated space on her MacBook's hard drive, between Manning and someone believed to be Assange. She wrote in a statement that the more she had tried to fit in at work, the more alienated she became from everyone around her.

=== Email to supervisor, recommended discharge ===
On April 24, 2010, Manning sent an email to her supervisor, Master Sergeant Paul Adkins—with the subject line "My Problem"—saying she was suffering from gender identity disorder. She attached a photograph of herself dressed as a woman and with the filename breanna.jpg. She wrote:

This is my problem. I've had signs of it for a very long time. It's caused problems within my family. I thought a career in the military would get rid of it. It's not something I seek out for attention, and I've been trying very, very hard to get rid of it by placing myself in situations where it would be impossible. But, it's not going away; it's haunting me more and more as I get older. Now, the consequences of it are dire, at a time when it's causing me great pain in itself.

Adkins discussed the situation with Manning's therapists, but did not pass the email to anybody above him in his chain of command; he told Manning's court-martial that he was concerned the photograph would be disseminated among other staff. Captain Steven Lim, Manning's company commander, said he first saw the email after Manning's arrest, when information about hormone replacement therapy was found in Manning's room on base; at that point Lim learned that Manning had been calling herself Breanna.

Manning told former "grey hat" hacker Adrian Lamo that she had set up Twitter and YouTube accounts as Breanna to give her female identity a digital presence, writing to Lamo: "I wouldn't mind going to prison for the rest of my life [for leaking information], or being executed so much, if it wasn't for the possibility of having pictures of me ... plastered all over the world press ... as [a] boy ... the CPU is not made for this motherboard". On April 30, she posted on Facebook that she was utterly lost, and over the next few days wrote that she was "not a piece of equipment", and was "beyond frustrated" and "livid" after being "lectured by ex-boyfriend despite months of relationship ambiguity".

On May 7, according to Army witnesses, Manning was found curled in a fetal position in a storage cupboard; she had a knife at her feet and had cut the words "I want" into a vinyl chair. A few hours later she had an altercation with an intelligence analyst, Specialist Jihrleah Showman, during which she punched Showman in the face. The brigade psychiatrist recommended a discharge, referring to an "occupational problem and adjustment disorder". Manning's supervisor removed the bolt from her weapon, making it unable to fire, and she was sent to work in the supply office, although her security clearance remained in place. As punishment for the altercation with Showman, she was demoted from Specialist (E-4) to Private First Class (E-3) three days before her arrest on May 27.

Ellen Nakashima writes that, on May 9, Manning contacted Jonathan Odell, a gay American novelist in Minneapolis, via Facebook, leaving a message that she wanted to speak to him in confidence; she said she had been involved in some "very high-profile events, albeit as a nameless individual thus far". On May 19, according to Army investigators, she emailed Eric Schmiedl, a mathematician she had met in Boston, and told him she had been the source of the Baghdad airstrike video. Two days later, she began the series of chats with Adrian Lamo that led to her arrest.

== Publication of leaked material ==
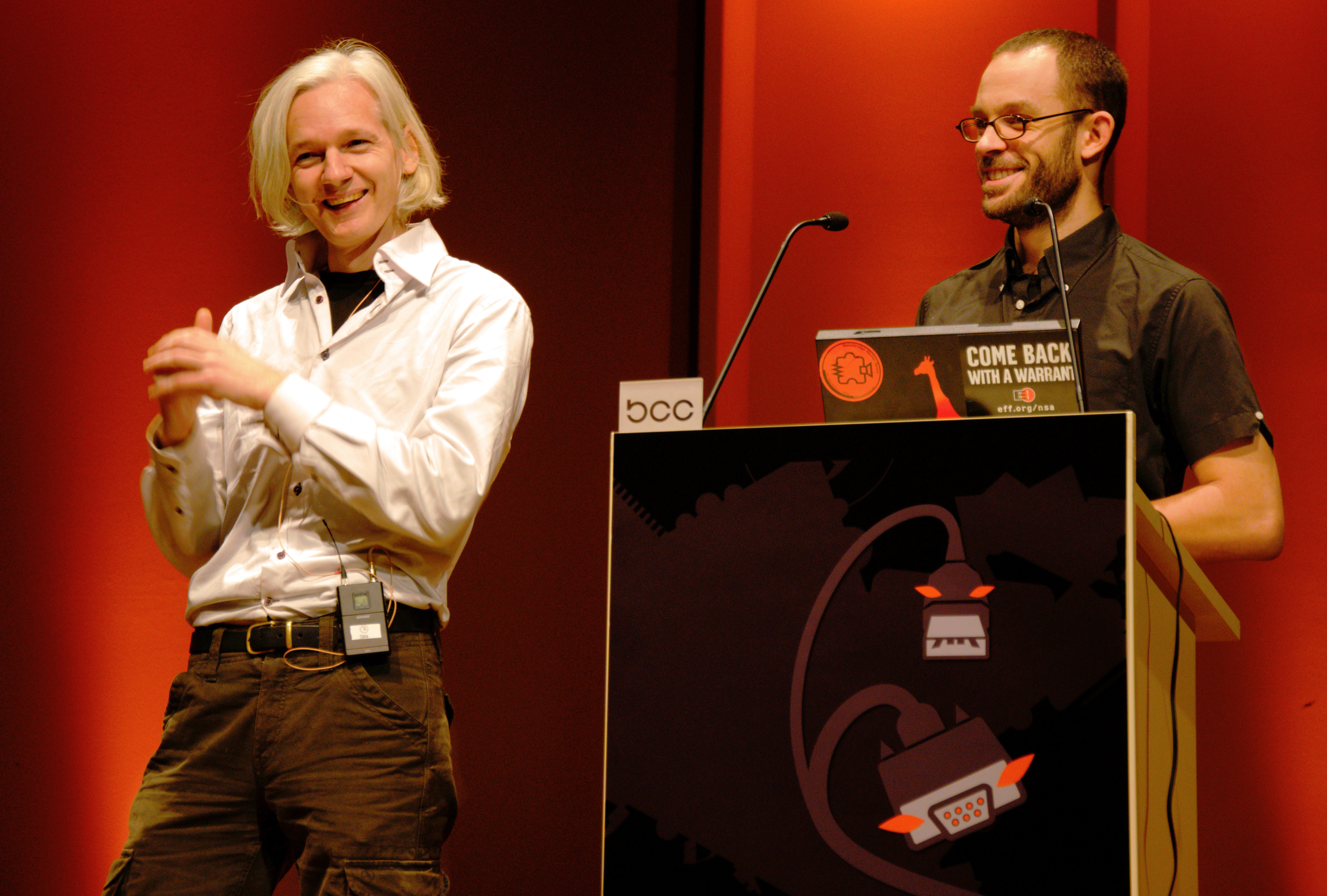
Julian Assange and Daniel Domscheit-Berg at the Chaos Communication Congress, Berlin, December 2009

WikiLeaks was set up in late 2006 as a disclosure portal, initially using the Wikipedia model, where volunteers would write up restricted or legally threatened material submitted by whistleblowers. Julian Assange—an Australian Internet activist and journalist, and the de facto editor-in-chief of WikiLeaks—had the idea of creating what Ben Laurie called an "open-source, democratic intelligence agency". The open-editing aspect was soon abandoned, but the site remained open for anonymous submissions.

According to Daniel Domscheit-Berg, a former WikiLeaks spokesperson, part of the site's security concept was that they did not know who their sources were. The New York Times wrote in December 2010 that the U.S. government was trying to discover whether Assange had been a passive recipient of material from Manning or had encouraged or helped her to extract the files, in which case he could be charged with conspiracy. Manning told Lamo in May 2010 that she had developed a working relationship with Assange, communicating directly with him using an encrypted Internet conferencing service, but knew little about him. WikiLeaks did not identify Manning as their source. Army investigators found pages of chats on Manning's computer between Manning and someone believed to be Assange. Nicks writes that, despite this, no decisive evidence was found of Assange's offering Manning any direction.

On February 18, 2010, WikiLeaks posted the first of the material from Manning, the diplomatic cable from the U.S. Embassy in Reykjavík, a document now known as "Reykjavik13". On March 15, WikiLeaks posted a 32-page report written in 2008 by the U.S. Department of Defense about WikiLeaks itself, and on March 29 it posted U.S. State Department profiles of politicians in Iceland.

During her 2013 trial, Manning said she had wanted the leaked information to become public "to make the world a better place" and "spark a domestic debate on the role of the military on foreign policy".

=== Baghdad airstrike ===
Manning said she gave WikiLeaks the July 12, 2007, Baghdad airstrike video in early 2010.

WikiLeaks named the Baghdad airstrike video "Collateral Murder", and Assange released it on April 5, 2010, during a press conference at the National Press Club in Washington, D.C. The video showed two US helicopters firing on a group of 10 men in the Amin District of Baghdad. Among the people killed in the attack were two Reuters employees, who were there to photograph an American Humvee under attack by the Mahdi Army. The U.S. pilots mistook their cameras for weapons. The helicopters also fired on a bongo truck, targeted earlier by one helicopter, that had stopped to help wounded members of the first group. Two children in the truck were wounded, and their father was killed. The pilots also attacked a building where retreating insurgents were holed up. Reuters requested a copy of the footage under the Freedom of Information Act. A spokesperson for the company said there was a compelling need for its immediate release. The United States Central Command replied that it could not give a time frame for release of the footage and that it might have been deleted. After a year, Reuters had received no formal response or written determination in accordance with the FOIA. Manning said in court that the video disturbed her as she felt it was clear the people in the bongo truck were merely attempting to assist the wounded and the army officers seemed full of bloodlust. The American officers called the people killed "dead bastards" and congratulated themselves on killing in large numbers. One of the weapons crew members asked a seriously injured person to pick up a weapon so he would have a reason to engage, instead of calling for medical help. Once the officers learned children were in the van, they said, “Well, it's their fault for bringing their kids into a battle".

The Washington Post wrote that the video, viewed by millions, put WikiLeaks "on the map". There was an internal debate within the T-SCIF division officers and analysts over whether the crew violated the rules of engagement in the second engagement. According to Nicks, Manning emailed a superior officer after the video aired and tried to persuade her that it was the same version as the one stored on SIPRNet. Nicks writes that it seemed as though Manning wanted to be caught.

=== Afghan War logs, Iraq War logs ===
On July 25, 2010, WikiLeaks and three media partners—The New York Times, The Guardian, and Der Spiegel—began publishing the 91,731 documents that, in their entirety, became known as the Afghan War Logs. (Around 77,000 of these had been published as of May 2012.) This was followed on October 22, 2010, by 391,832 classified military reports covering the period January 2004 to December 2009, which became known as the Iraq War Logs. The reports detail 109,032 deaths in Iraq: 66,081 civilians; 23,984 enemy deaths (those labeled as insurgents); 15,196 host nation deaths (Iraqi government forces) and 3,771 friendly deaths (coalition forces).

Most of the deaths (66,000, over 60%) were civilian deaths and the numbers are equivalent to 31 civilians killed every day for 6 years. For comparison, the "Afghan War Diaries", also released by WikiLeaks, covering the same period, detail the deaths of some 20,000 people.

=== Other leaks ===
Manning was also responsible for the "Cablegate" leak of 251,287 State Department cables, written by 271 American embassies and consulates in 180 countries, dated December 1966 to February 2010. Assange passed the cables to his three media partners, plus El País and others, and they were published in stages from November 28, 2010, with the names of sources removed. WikiLeaks said it was the largest set of confidential documents ever released into the public domain. WikiLeaks published the remaining cables, unredacted, on September 1, 2011, after David Leigh and Luke Harding of The Guardian inadvertently published the passphrase for a file that was still online; Nicks writes that an Ethiopian journalist consequently had to leave his country, and the U.S. government said it had to relocate several sources.

Manning was accused of being the source of the Guantanamo Bay files leak obtained by WikiLeaks in 2010 and published by The New York Times and The Guardian in April 2011. Manning said she gave WikiLeaks a video in March 2010 of the Granai airstrike in Afghanistan. The airstrike occurred on May 4, 2009, in the village of Granai, Afghanistan, killing 86 to 147 Afghan civilians. The video was never published; Assange said in March 2013 that Daniel Domscheit-Berg had taken it with him when he left WikiLeaks and had apparently destroyed it.

== Censorship and whistleblowing in the U.S. ==
Project Censored, an American news watchdog, voted "Bradley Manning and the Failure of Corporate Media" the top censored story of 2014. Mainstream media took the opportunity to break Manning's story on their headlines, but the trial was noticeably underreported. The limited coverage focused on Manning's sexual orientation and troubled life, and the hero-or-traitor debate, with no mention of the implications Manning and other whistleblowers faced in the prosecution's charge of "abetting the enemy" or of the fact that no outside parties have access to the evidence, court documents, court orders, or off-the-record arguments of the trial. The charge of "abetting the enemy" could have set a precedent for whistleblowers and journalists to be given life sentences without parole if the confidential material they published was read by the enemy.

In her first public statement since arrest at the pre-trial hearings, Manning spoke out about the trauma she endured from the lengthy removal of her clothes during suicide watch and verbal abuse that prompted a United Nations investigation. The media watchdog group Fairness & Accuracy in Reporting (FAIR) found coverage severely lacking for one of the largest whistleblowing operations in the US. There was TV coverage on CBS and a brief AP wire on the New York Times. PBS mentioned the trial in passing. FAIR's report concluded, "the minimal attention to Manning's trial last week tell us how little corporate media care about the mistreatment of a government whistleblower." The New York Times's public editor said the hearing was important and the Times should be there.

Independent and non-American media covered Manning's trial more comprehensively. The Guardian had written about the Obama DOJ's efforts to criminalize whistleblowing and intimidate the press, quoting a former DOJ advisor saying the trial could have "far-reaching consequences for chilling freedom of speech and rendering the internet a hazardous environment, well beyond any demonstrable national security interest." Manning's case comes as journalists worldwide are already facing increasing threats. Eric Lichtblau of The New York Times quit writing about national security in fear of subpoena just before the Obama administration after hearing the FBI had been monitoring his phone and Internet communications after he wrote a piece on the NSA. Lichtblau said, "It certainly made it more difficult to do my job in dealing with confidential sources when you realize you may be forced to testify before a grand jury or risk going to jail to protect a source."

The Independent reported on the lack of transparency, tying the story back to the DOJ's undisclosed seizing of 20 AP staff's phone and email records, and covered a protest of approximately 1,000 sympathisers and civil rights activists who voiced their support for Manning. An opinion piece for The Independent said that Manning had done Americans a great service by exposing the truth of US atrocities abroad through its military dominance, where America used its military operatives, such as the CIA and army, to destabilize regions and promote dictatorships sympathetic to the West for exploitation in global markets. It spoke of the military dictatorship of Chile's rise through secret CIA aid to overthrow democratically elected socialist president Salvador Allende, but many other stories exist, such as US funding of militants in the Sahel to gain access to West African oil, the US-backed 2002 coup against Venezuela's Hugo Chávez, the Vietnam War, and support of jihadists throughout the Middle East.

The article and Manning's whistleblowing operation comes as other journalists inquire deeper into US involvement in Iraq and the media's silence on issues such as Western corporate interests in Iraq, the Bush administration's blocking of a European Union-supported nuclear deal with Iran, and a 17-fold increase in congenital birth defects in Basra, likely from military debris. Ten years after the initial invasion passed before CNN published an article by Antonia Juhasz arguing the main goal of the Iraq War was to gain access to the nationalized Iraqi oil industry, which was closed to foreign firms. In a 2024 editorial, Manning wrote, "As Iraq erupts in civil war [...] that [...] should give new urgency to the question of how the United States military controlled the media coverage of its long involvement there and in Afghanistan".

While the US military was upbeat in its public outlook on the 2010 Iraqi elections, suggesting it had helped bring stability and democracy to the country, "those of us stationed there were acutely aware of a more complicated reality", Manning wrote. She was "shocked by our military's complicity in the corruption of that election. Yet these deeply troubling details flew under the American media's radar."

== Manning and Adrian Lamo ==
=== First contact ===
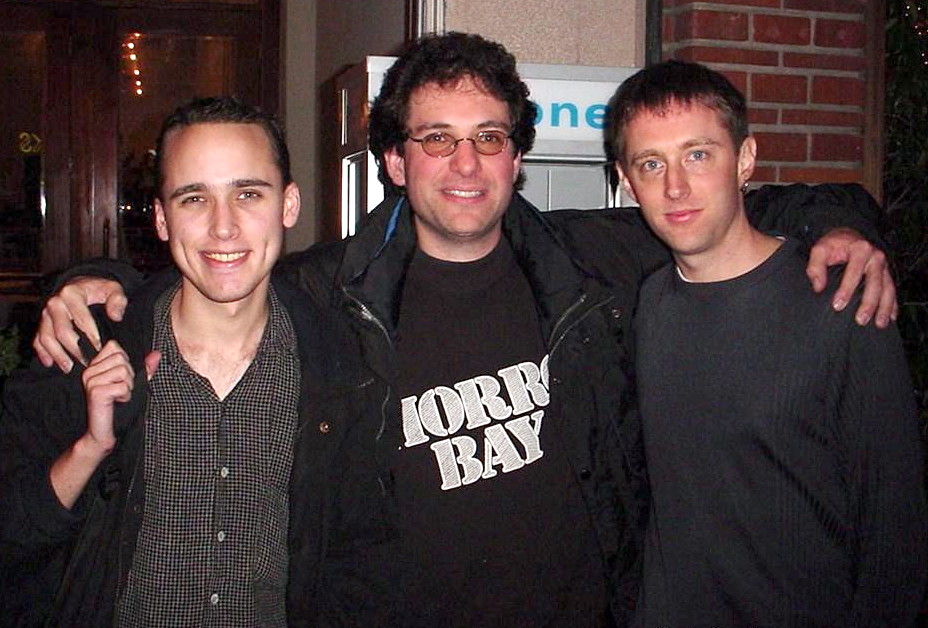
Adrian Lamo (left) and Wired's Kevin Poulsen (right) in 2001. The person in the middle, Kevin Mitnick, had no involvement in the Manning case.

On May 20, 2010, Manning contacted Adrian Lamo, a former "grey hat" hacker convicted in 2004 of having accessed The New York Times's computer network two years earlier without permission. Lamo had been profiled that day by Kevin Poulsen in Wired magazine; the story said Lamo had been involuntarily hospitalized and diagnosed with Asperger syndrome. Poulsen, by then a reporter, was himself a former hacker who had used Lamo as a source several times since 2000. In 2002, Poulsen told The New York Times that Lamo had gained unauthorized access to its network; he then wrote the story up for SecurityFocus. Lamo would hack into a system, tell the organization, then offer to fix its security, often using Poulsen as a go-between.

Lamo said Manning sent him several encrypted emails on May 20. He said he was unable to decrypt them but replied anyway and invited the emailer to chat on AOL IM. Lamo said he later turned the emails over to the FBI without having read them.

=== Chats ===
In a series of chats between May 21 and 25, Manning—using the handle "bradass87"—told Lamo that she had leaked classified material. She introduced herself as an Army intelligence analyst, and within 17 minutes, without waiting for a reply, alluded to the leaks.

Lamo replied several hours later. He said: "I'm a journalist and a minister. You can pick either, and treat this as a confession or an interview (never to be published) & enjoy a modicum of legal protection." They talked about restricted material in general, then Manning made her first explicit reference to the leaks: "This is what I do for friends." She linked to a section of the May 21, 2010, version of Wikipedia's article on WikiLeaks, which described the WikiLeaks release in March that year of a Department of Defense report on WikiLeaks itself. She added "the one below that is mine too"; the section below in the same article referred to the leak of the Baghdad airstrike ("Collateral Murder") video. Manning said she felt isolated and fragile, and was reaching out to someone she hoped might understand.

Manning said she had started to help WikiLeaks around Thanksgiving in November 2009—which fell on November 26 that year—after WikiLeaks had released the 9/11 pager messages; the messages were released on November 25. She told Lamo she had recognized that the messages came from an NSA database and that seeing them had made her feel comfortable about stepping forward. Lamo asked what kind of material Manning was dealing with; Manning replied: "uhm ... crazy, almost criminal political backdealings ... the non-PR-versions of world events and crises ..." Although she said she dealt with Assange directly, Manning also said Assange had adopted a deliberate policy of knowing very little about her, telling Manning: "lie to me".

Lamo again assured her that she was speaking in confidence. Manning wrote: "but im not a source for you ... im talking to you as someone who needs moral and emotional fucking support", and Lamo replied: "i told you, none of this is for print."

Manning said the incident that had affected her the most was when the Iraqi Federal Police arrested 15 detainees for printing anti-Iraqi literature. The Army asked her to find out who the "bad guys" were, and she discovered that the detainees had followed what Manning said was a corruption trail within the Iraqi cabinet. She reported this to her commanding officer, but said "he didn't want to hear any of it"; she said the officer told her to help the Iraqi police find more detainees. Manning said it made her realize "i was actively involved in something that i was completely against".

She said, "I cant separate myself from others ... I feel connected to everybody ... like they were distant family", citing Carl Sagan, Richard Feynman and Elie Wiesel. She said she hoped the material would lead to "hopefully worldwide discussion, debates, and reforms. if not ... than [sic] we're doomed as a species." She said she had downloaded the material onto Lady Gaga music CD-RWs, erased the music and replaced it with a compressed split file. Part of the reason no one noticed, she said, was that staff were working 14 hours a day, seven days a week, and "people stopped caring after 3 weeks".

=== Lamo approaches authorities, chat logs published ===
Shortly after the first chat with Manning, Lamo discussed the information with Chet Uber of the volunteer group Project Vigilant, which researches cybercrime, and Timothy Webster, a friend who had worked in Army counterintelligence. Both advised Lamo to go to the authorities. His friend informed the Army's Criminal Investigation Command (CID), and Lamo was contacted by CID agents shortly thereafter. He told them he believed Manning was endangering lives. The hacker community largely ostracized him afterward, but Nicks argues that it was thanks to Lamo that the government had months to ameliorate any harm caused by the release of the diplomatic cables.

On May 25, Lamo met with FBI and Army investigators in California and showed them the chat logs. On or around that date he also passed the story to Kevin Poulsen of Wired, and on May 27 gave him the chat logs and Manning's name under embargo. He met with the FBI again that day, at which point they told him Manning had been arrested in Iraq the day before. Poulsen and Kim Zetter broke the news of the arrest in Wired on June 6. Wired published around 25% of the chat logs on June 6 and 10, and the full logs in July 2011.

== Legal proceedings ==
=== Arrest and charges ===
The Army's Criminal Investigation Command arrested Manning on May 27, 2010, and four days later transferred her to Camp Arifjan in Kuwait. She was charged with several offenses in July, replaced by 22 charges in March 2011, including violations of Articles 92 and 134 of the Uniform Code of Military Justice (UCMJ), and of the Espionage Act. The most serious charge was "aiding the enemy", a capital offense, although prosecutors said they would not seek the death penalty. Another charge, which Manning's defense called a "made-up offense" but of which she was found guilty, read that Manning "wantonly [caused] to be published on the internet intelligence belonging to the U.S. government, having knowledge that intelligence published on the internet is accessible to the enemy".

=== Detention ===
While in Kuwait, Manning was placed on suicide watch. She was moved from Kuwait to the Marine Corps Base Quantico, Virginia, on July 29, 2010, and classified as a maximum custody detainee with Prevention of Injury (POI) status. POI status is a less extreme form of suicide watch, entailing checks by guards every five minutes. She wrote in a legal letter released by her lawyer that she believed the suicide watch was imposed not because she was a danger to herself but as retribution for a protest about her treatment held outside Quantico. Sixteen entries from August 27 to January 28 show that Manning was evaluated by prison psychiatrists who found she was not a danger to herself and should be removed from the POI order. Immediately before the suicide watch started, she said guards verbally harassed her, taunting her with conflicting orders. Her lawyer, David Coombs, a former military attorney, said Manning was not allowed to sleep between 5 am (7 am on weekends) and 8 pm, and was made to stand or sit up if she tried to. She was required to remain visible at all times, including at night, which entailed no access to sheets, no pillow except one built into her mattress, and a blanket designed not to be shredded. Manning complained that she regarded it as pretrial punishment.

Her cell was 6 × 12 ft (1.8 x 3.6 m) with no window, containing a bed, toilet, and sink. The jail had 30 cells built in a U shape, and although detainees could talk to one another, they were unable to see each other. She was allowed to walk for up to one hour a day, meals were taken in the cell, and she was shackled during visits. There was access to television when it was placed in the corridor, and she was allowed to keep one magazine and one book. Because she was in pretrial detention, she received full pay.

On January 18, 2011, after Manning had an altercation with the guards, the commander of Quantico classified her as a suicide risk. Manning said the guards had begun issuing conflicting commands, such as "turn left, don't turn left", and upbraiding her for responding to commands with "yes" instead of "aye". Shortly afterward, she was placed on suicide watch, had her clothing and eyeglasses removed, and was required to remain in her cell 24 hours a day. The suicide watch was lifted on January 21 after her lawyer complained, and the brig commander who ordered it was replaced. On March 2, she was told that her request for removal of POI status—which entailed among other things sleeping wearing only boxer shorts—had been denied. Her lawyer said Manning joked to the guards that, if she wanted to harm herself, she could do so with her underwear or her flip-flops. The comment resulted in Manning's being ordered to strip naked in her cell that night and sleep without clothing. On the following morning only, Manning stood naked for inspection. After protest from her lawyer and some media attention, Manning was issued a sleeping garment on or before March 11.

The detention conditions prompted national and international concern. Juan E. Méndez, United Nations Special Rapporteur on torture, told The Guardian that the U.S. government's treatment of Manning was "cruel, inhuman and degrading". In January 2011, Amnesty International asked the British government to intervene because of Manning's status as a British citizen by descent, although Manning's lawyer said Manning did not regard herself as a British citizen. On March 10, State Department spokesman Philip J. Crowley criticized Manning's treatment as "ridiculous, counterproductive and stupid". The next day, President Obama responded to Crowley's comments, saying the Pentagon had assured him that Manning's treatment was "appropriate and meet[s] our basic standards". Under political pressure, Crowley resigned three days after his comments. On March 15, 295 members of the academic legal community signed a statement arguing that Manning was being subjected to "degrading and inhumane pretrial punishment" and criticizing Obama's comments. On April 20, the Pentagon transferred Manning to the medium-custody Midwest Joint Regional Correctional Facility, at Fort Leavenworth, Kansas, where she was placed in an 80-square-foot cell with a window and a normal mattress, able to mix with other pretrial detainees and keep personal objects in her cell.

=== Evidence presented at Article 32 hearing ===
In April 2011, a panel of experts, having completed a medical and mental evaluation of Manning, ruled that she was fit to stand trial. An Article 32 hearing, presided over by Lieutenant Colonel Paul Almanza, was convened on December 16, 2011, at Fort Meade, Maryland; after the hearing, Almanza recommended that Manning be referred to a general court-martial. She was arraigned on February 23, 2012, and declined to enter a plea.

During the Article 32 hearing, the prosecution, led by Captain Ashden Fein, presented 300,000 pages of documents in evidence, including chat logs and classified material. The court heard from two Army investigators: Special Agent David Shaver, head of the digital forensics and research branch of the Army's Computer Crime Investigative Unit (CCIU); and Mark Johnson, a digital forensics contractor from ManTech International, who works for the CCIU. They testified that they had found 100,000 State Department cables on a workplace computer Manning had used between November 2009 and May 2010; 400,000 military reports from Iraq and 91,000 from Afghanistan on an SD card found in her room in her aunt's home in Potomac, Maryland; and 10,000 cables on her personal MacBook Pro and storage devices that they said had not been given to WikiLeaks because a file was corrupted. They also recovered 14 to 15 pages of encrypted chats in unallocated space on Manning's MacBook hard drive between Manning and someone believed to be Assange. Two of the chat handles, which used the Berlin Chaos Computer Club's domain (ccc.de), were associated with the names Julian Assange and Nathaniel Frank.

Johnson said he found SSH logs on the MacBook that showed an SFTP connection from an IP address that resolved to Manning's aunt's home to a Swedish IP address with links to WikiLeaks. Also found was a text file named "Readme", attached to the logs and apparently written by Manning to Assange, which called the Iraq and Afghan War logs "possibly one of the most significant documents of our time, removing the fog of war and revealing the true nature of 21st century asymmetric warfare". The investigators testified they had also recovered an exchange from May 2010 between Manning and Eric Schmiedl, a Boston mathematician, in which Manning said she was the source of the Baghdad helicopter attack ("Collateral Murder") video. Johnson said there had been two attempts to delete the material from the MacBook. The operating system had been reinstalled in January 2010, and on or around January 31, 2010, an attempt had been made to erase the hard drive by doing a "zero-fill", which involves overwriting material with zeroes. The material was recovered after the overwrite attempts from unallocated space.

Manning's lawyers argued that the government had overstated the harm the release of the documents had caused and had overcharged Manning to force her to testify against Assange. The defense also raised questions about whether Manning's confusion over her gender identity affected her behavior and decision making.

=== Guilty plea, trial, sentence ===
United States v. Manning
- Court: United States Army Military District of Washington
- Full case name: United States of America v. Manning, Bradley E., PFC
- Decided: July 30, 2013

Case history
- Prior actions: Article 32 hearing, opened December 16, 2011; Formally charged, February 23, 2012; Article 39 (pretrial) hearing, opened April 24, 2012

Court membership
- Judge sitting: Colonel Denise Lind

The judge, Army Colonel Denise Lind, ruled in January 2013 that any sentence would be reduced by 112 days because of the treatment Manning received at Quantico. On February 28, Manning pleaded guilty to 10 of the 22 charges. Reading for over an hour from a 35-page statement, she said she had leaked the cables "to show the true cost of war". Prosecutors pursued a court-martial on the remaining charges.

The trial began on June 3, 2013. On July 30, Manning was convicted on 17 of the 22 charges in their entirety, including five counts of espionage and theft, and an amended version of four other charges; she was acquitted of aiding the enemy. The sentencing phase began the next day.

Captain Michael Worsley, a military psychologist who had treated Manning before her arrest, testified that Manning had been left isolated in the Army, trying to deal with gender identity issues in a "hyper-masculine environment". David Moulton, a Navy forensic psychiatrist who saw Manning after the arrest, said Manning had narcissistic traits, and showed signs of both fetal alcohol syndrome and Asperger syndrome. He said that, in leaking the material, Manning had been "acting out [a] grandiose ideation".

A defense psychiatrist, testifying to Manning's motives, suggested a different agenda:

Well, Pfc Manning was under the impression that [her] leaked information was going to really change how the world views the wars in Afghanistan and Iraq, and future wars, actually. This was an attempt to crowdsource analysis of the war, and it was [her] opinion that if ... through crowdsourcing, enough analysis was done on these documents, which [she] felt to be very important, that it would lead to a greater good ... that society as a whole would come to the conclusion that the war wasn't worth it ... that really no wars are worth it.

On August 14, Manning apologized to the court: "I am sorry that my actions hurt people. I'm sorry that they hurt the United States. I am sorry for the unintended consequences of my actions. When I made these decisions I believed I was going to help people, not hurt people. ... At the time of my decisions, I was dealing with a lot of issues."

Manning's offenses carried a maximum sentence of 90 years. The government asked for 60 years as a deterrent to others, while Manning's lawyer asked for no more than 25 years. On August 21 she was sentenced to 35 years in prison, reduction in rank to private (private E-1 or Pvt), forfeiture of all pay and allowances, and a dishonorable discharge. She was given credit for 1,293 days of pretrial confinement, including 112 days for her treatment at Quantico, and would have been eligible for parole after serving one-third of the sentence. She was confined at the US Disciplinary Barracks (USDB) at Fort Leavenworth, Kansas.

The sentence was criticized as "unjust and unfair" by The Guardian and as "excessive" by The New York Times.

On April 14, 2014, Manning's request for clemency was denied; the case went to the United States Army Court of Criminal Appeals for further review.

=== Requests for release ===
On September 3, 2013, Manning's lawyer filed a Petition for Commutation of Sentence to President Obama through the pardon attorney at the Department of Justice and Secretary of the Army John M. McHugh. The petition contended that Manning's disclosures did not cause any "real damage", and that the documents in question did not merit protection, as they were not sensitive. The request included a supporting letter from Amnesty International which said that Manning's leaks had exposed violations of human rights. David Coombs's cover letter touched on Manning's role as a whistleblower, asking that Manning be granted a full pardon or that her sentence be reduced to time served.

In April 2015, Amnesty International posted online a letter from Manning in which she wrote: "I am now preparing for my court-martial appeal before the first appeals court. The appeal team, with my attorneys Nancy Hollander and Vince Ward, are hoping to file our brief before the court in the next six months. We have already had success in getting the court to respect my gender identity by using feminine pronouns in the court filings (she, her, etc.)."

In November 2016, Manning made a formal petition to Obama to reduce her 35-year sentence to the six years of time she had already served. On December 10, 2016, a White House petition to commute her sentence reached the minimum 100,000 signatures required for an official response. Lawyers familiar with clemency applications said in December 2016 that a pardon was unlikely; the request did not fit the usual criteria.

=== Commutation, release, and appeal ===
In January 2017, a Justice Department source said that Manning was on Obama's short list for a possible commutation. On January 17, Obama commuted all but four months of Manning's remaining sentence. In a press conference held on January 18, he said that Manning's original 35-year prison sentence was "very disproportionate relative to what other leakers have received" and that "it makes sense to commute—and not pardon—her sentence". In 2021, Forbes reported that Obama's commutation of Manning's sentence was "unconditional". Notwithstanding her commutation, Manning's military appeal would continue, with her attorney saying, "We fight in her appeal to clear her name."

On January 26, 2017, in her first column for The Guardian since the commutation, Manning lamented that Obama's political opponents consistently refused to compromise, resulting in "very few permanent accomplishments" during his time in office. As The Guardian summarized it, she saw Obama's legacy as "a warning against not being bold enough". In response, President Donald Trump tweeted that Manning was an "ungrateful traitor" and should "never have been released".

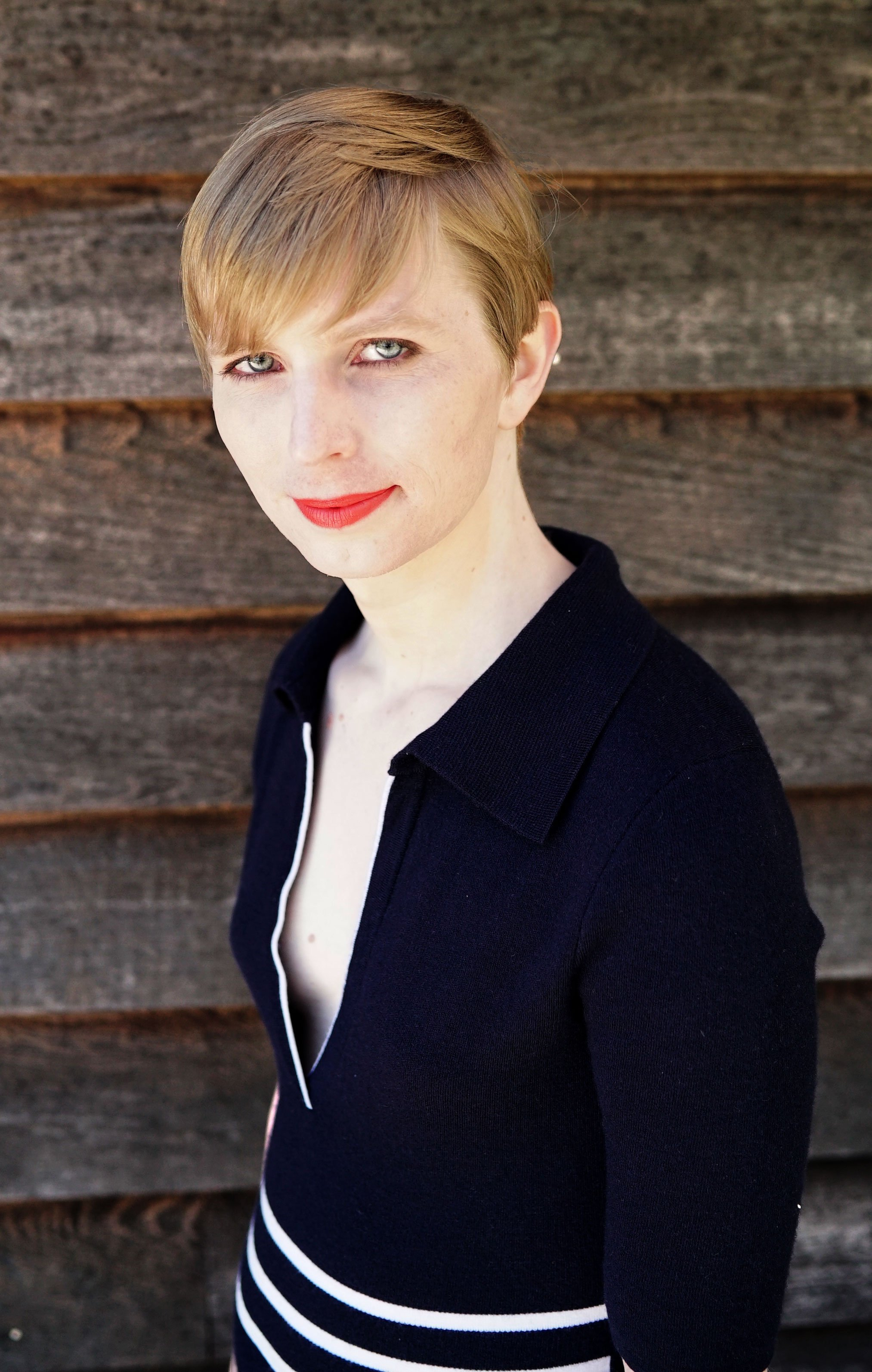
Manning in a photo published a day after her release

Manning was released from Fort Leavenworth's detention center at approximately 2 a.m. Central Time on May 17, 2017. Although sentenced during her court-martial to be dishonorably discharged, Manning was reportedly returned to active unpaid "excess leave" status while her appeal was pending.

On May 31, 2018, the U.S. Army Court of Criminal Appeals upheld Manning's 2013 court-martial conviction of violating the Espionage Act. The court rejected Manning's contention that the statute was too vague to provide fair notice of the criminal nature of disclosing classified documents. "The facts of this case", the three-judge panel ruled, "leave no question as to what constituted national defense information. Appellant's training and experience indicate, without any doubt, she was on notice and understood the nature of the information she was disclosing and how its disclosure could negatively affect national defense." The court also rejected Manning's assertion that her actions in disclosing classified information related to national security are protected by the First Amendment. Manning, the court found, "had no First Amendment right to make the disclosures—doing so not only violated the nondisclosure agreements she signed but also jeopardized national security".

On May 30, 2019, the U.S. Court of Appeals for the Armed Forces denied Manning's petition for grant of review of the decision of the U.S. Army Court of Criminal Appeals.

=== 2019 jailing for contempt ===
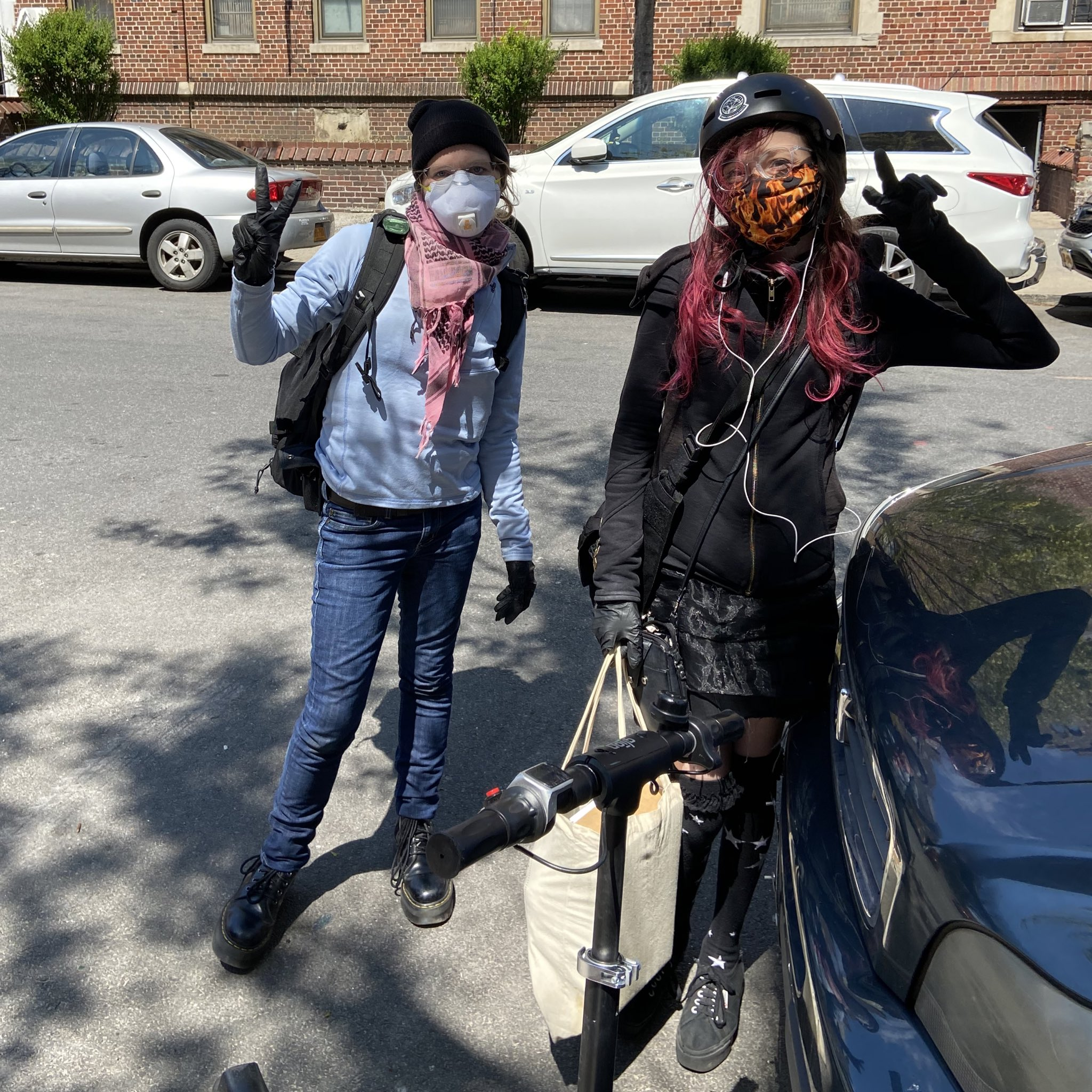
Manning (left) in Brooklyn during the coronavirus pandemic in April 2020, forty days after her release from jail

In February 2019, Manning received a subpoena to testify in a U.S. government case proceeding under prosecutors in Virginia against Assange, the existence of which had been accidentally revealed in November 2018. Manning objected to the secrecy of the grand jury proceedings and announced she would refuse to testify, saying: "We’ve seen this power abused countless times to target political speech. I have nothing to contribute to this case and I resent being forced to endanger myself by participating in this predatory practice." She added that she had provided all the information she had in 2013 during her court martial and that she stood by her previous answers.

On March 8, 2019, Manning was found in contempt of court and jailed in the women's wing of a detention center in Alexandria, Virginia, with the judge conditioning her release on her testifying or the grand jury concluding its work. Manning was initially held in administrative segregation for 28 days until she was placed in the general population on April 5, 2019. Her supporters described her period in administrative segregation as "effective solitary confinement" as it involved "up to 22 hours each day spent in isolation". Officials at the facility said that administrative segregation was used for safety reasons and that prisoners still had access to recreation and social visits during that time. On April 22, 2019, a federal appeals court upheld the trial court's decision holding Manning in contempt and denied Manning's request to be released on bail.

After the grand jury's term expired, Manning was released on May 9, 2019, and was served with a subpoena to appear before a new grand jury on May 16. She again refused to testify, saying that she "believe[d] this grand jury seeks to undermine the integrity of public discourse with the aim of punishing those who expose any serious, ongoing, and systemic abuses of power by this government". The court ordered her returned to jail and fined $500 for each day over 30 days and $1,000 for each day over 60 days. In June 2019, she challenged the fines because of inability to pay. On December 30, 2019, United Nations special rapporteur Nils Melzer released a letter dated November 1, 2019, in which he accused the U.S. government of torturing Manning, called for her immediate release, and called for her court fines to be canceled or reimbursed.

On March 11, 2020, Manning attempted suicide two days before she was scheduled to appear before a judge on a motion to terminate sanctions. Alexandria Sheriff Dana Lawhorne reported that Manning was safe and her lawyers said she was recovering in a hospital.

On March 12, 2020, US District Judge Anthony Trenga of the Eastern District of Virginia found that the grand jury's business had concluded. Since Manning's testimony was no longer needed, the judge found that detention no longer served any coercive purpose and ordered her released. He denied a request by Manning's lawyers to vacate her accrued fines of $256,000, which he ordered due and payable immediately. The same day, a supporter launched an online crowdfunding campaign to defray Manning's fines. Within 48 hours, nearly 7,000 donations ranging from $5 to $10,000 were received, totaling $267,000. A separate crowdfund by the same supporter raised an additional $50,000 to help pay Manning's post-incarceration living expenses.

In January 2021, in refusing to extradite Assange to the U.S. for trial on federal charges, UK District Judge Vanessa Baraitser cited Manning's March 2020 suicide attempt to support finding that, if exposed to the "harsh conditions" of incarceration in America, "Assange's mental health would deteriorate, causing him to commit suicide".

== Reaction to disclosures ==
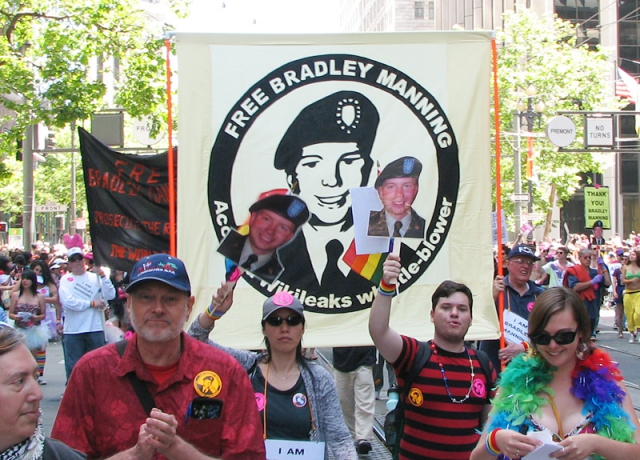
Demonstration in support of Manning, San Francisco, June 2011

The publication of the leaked material, particularly the diplomatic cables, attracted in-depth coverage worldwide, with several governments blocking websites that contained embarrassing details. Guardian editor Alan Rusbridger said: "I can't think of a time when there was ever a story generated by a news organization where the White House, the Kremlin, Chávez, India, China, everyone in the world was talking about these things. ... I've never known a story that created such mayhem that wasn't an event like a war or a terrorist attack."

United States Navy Admiral Michael Mullen, then Chairman of the Joint Chiefs of Staff, said the leaks had placed American soldiers and Afghan informants in danger. Journalist Glenn Greenwald argued that Manning was the most important whistleblower since Daniel Ellsberg leaked the Pentagon Papers in 1971. In an impromptu questioning session after a fundraiser, captured on a cellphone video, President Obama said that Manning "broke the law", which was later criticized as "unlawful command influence" on Manning's upcoming trial.

In 2011, Manning and WikiLeaks were credited in part, along with news reporters and political analysts, as catalysts for the Arab Spring that began in December 2010, when waves of protesters rose up against rulers across the Middle East and North Africa, after the leaked cables exposed government corruption. But in 2012, James L. Gelvin, an American scholar of Middle Eastern history, wrote: "After the outbreak [January 2011] of the Egyptian uprising ... journalists decided to abandon another term they had applied to the Tunisian uprising: the first 'WikiLeaks Revolution,' a title they had adopted that overemphasized the role played by the leaked American cables about corruption in provoking the protests."

A Washington Post editorial asked why an apparently unstable Army private had been able to access and transfer sensitive material in the first place. According to her biographer, the American far-right saw Manning's sexuality as evidence that gay people were unfit for military service, while the American mainstream thought of Manning as a gay soldier driven mad by bullying.

A Defense Department report a year after the breach found that Manning's document leaks had no significant strategic impact on US war efforts. The heavily redacted final report was not published until June 2017, after a Freedom of Information request by investigative reporter Jason Leopold.

== Awards and tributes ==
In 2011, the German Section of the International Association of Lawyers against Nuclear Arms and the Federation of German Scientists awarded Manning a "Whistleblowerpreis". While still in detention in 2011, Graham Nash of Crosby, Stills and Nash released a song, "Almost Gone (The Ballad of Bradley Manning)", in reference to her deteriorated mental state. In 2012, she received a "People's Choice Award" from Global Exchange. In 2013, the U.S. Peace Memorial Foundation awarded her The US Peace Prize "for conspicuous bravery, at the risk of his own freedom, above and beyond the call of duty". The same year, the International Peace Bureau awarded her the Sean MacBride Peace Prize. In 2014, Sam Adams Associates gave her the Sam Adams Award for Integrity in Intelligence.

Icelandic and Swedish Pirate Party MPs nominated Manning and fellow whistleblower Edward Snowden for the 2014 Nobel Peace Prize. In 2013, Roots Action launched a petition nominating Manning for the prize that received more than 100,000 supporting signatures.

In May 2015, Anything to Say?, an art installation made of mobile bronze statues of Manning, Snowden, and Assange, was placed at Berlin's Alexanderplatz for a weekend, as a "monument for courage". Germany's Green Party sponsored the sculpture, by Italian sculptor Davide Dormino. The installation was later exhibited in different European cities.

In 2015, Paper magazine commissioned artist Heather Dewey-Hagborg to create 2D DNA phenotype portraits of Manning using DNA collected from cheek swabs and hair clippings Manning sent the artist while incarcerated. 3D printed versions of the portraits premiered at the World Economic Forum in 2016. In the summer of 2017, Manning (by then released from prison) and Dewey-Hagborg presented their collaboration at an exhibition at the Fridman Gallery in New York City.

In September 2017, Manning accepted the EFF Pioneer Award in recognition of her actions as a whistleblower and for her work as an advocate for government transparency and transgender rights. In November, she was named 2017 Newsmaker of the Year by Out, which noted her "whistle-in-the-wind tenacity that belies the trauma she's had to contend with". Later that month, Bitch listed her among the first-ever "Bitch 50" impactful creators, artists, and activists in pop culture, recognizing her as "a leading voice for transgender and healthcare rights". In December, Foreign Policy honored Manning as one of its forty-eight 2017 Global Thinkers "for forcing the United States to question who is a traitor and who is a hero".

In October 2020, Manning shared with the German nonprofit investigative journalism organization CORRECT!V and Greece's anonymous Novartis whistleblowers the third annual European United Left–Nordic Green Left (GUE/NGL) prize for Journalists, Whistleblowers and Defenders of the Right to Information. The GUE/NGL posted a video of her acceptance from her home in Brooklyn, New York.

== Gender transition ==
=== 2010–2013 ===
In an article written by Manning, she says her first public appearance as female was in February 2010 while on leave from her military duties; Manning was exhilarated to blend in as a woman.

On August 22, 2013, the day after sentencing, Manning's attorney issued a press release to the Today show announcing that his client was a female, and asked that she be referred to by her new name of Chelsea and feminine pronouns. Manning's statement included the following:

As I transition into this next phase of my life, I want everyone to know the real me. I am Chelsea Manning. I am a female. Given the way that I feel, and have felt since childhood, I want to begin hormone therapy as soon as possible. I hope that you will support me in this transition. I also request that, starting today, you refer to me by my new name and use the feminine pronoun (except in official mail to the confinement facility). I look forward to receiving letters from supporters and having the opportunity to write back.

The news media split in its reaction to Manning's request; some organizations used the new name and pronouns, and others continued to use the former ones. Advocacy groups such as GLAAD, the National Lesbian and Gay Journalists Association, and the Human Rights Campaign (HRC) encouraged media outlets to refer to Manning by her self-identified name and pronoun.

=== 2014 ===
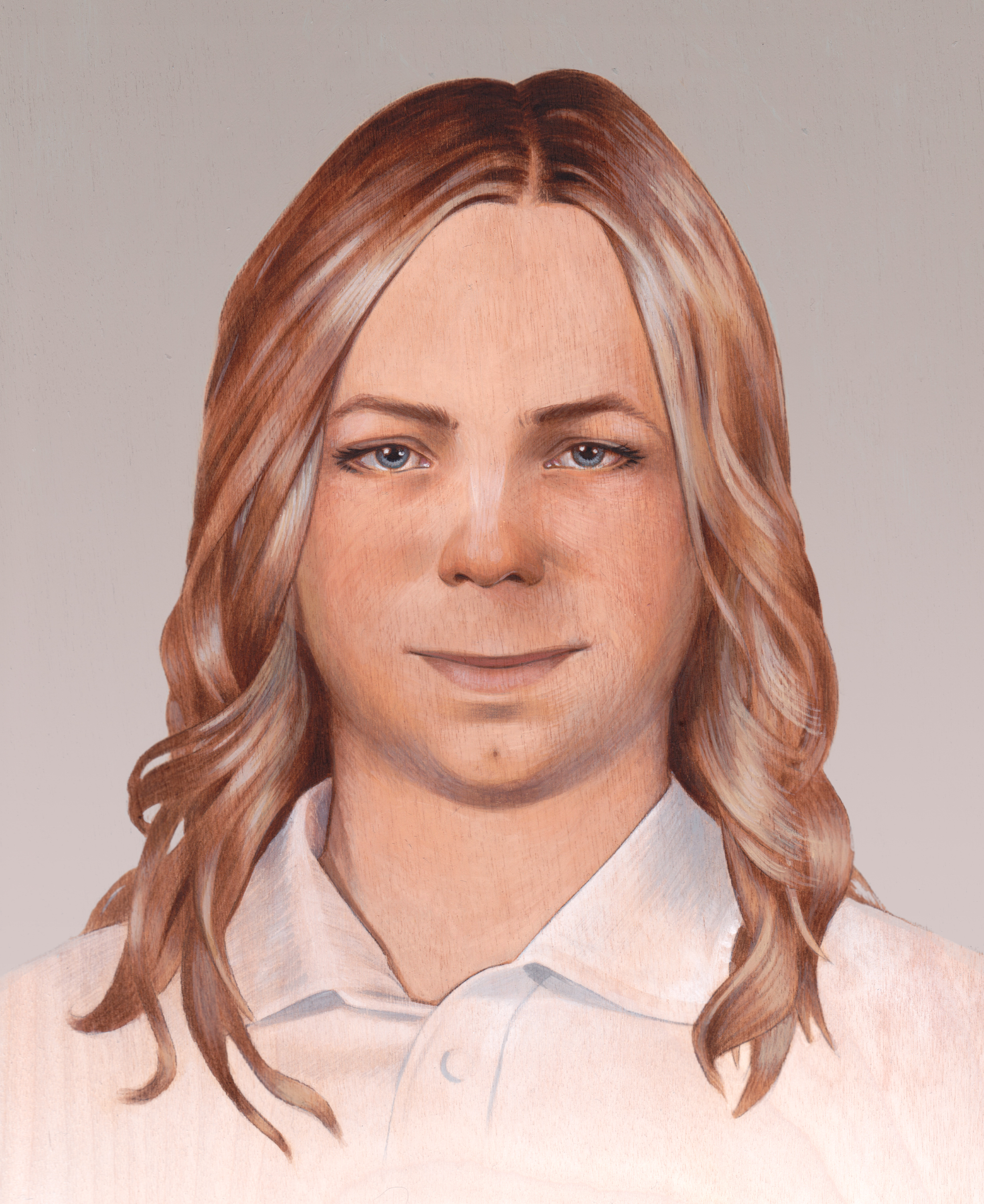
How Chelsea Manning sees herself, a 2014 painting released by the Chelsea Manning Support Network

In April 2014, the Kansas District Court granted a petition from Manning for a legal name change. An Army spokesman stated that while the Army would update personnel records to acknowledge the name change, the military would continue to regard Manning as a male. Manning sought hormone therapy and the right to live as a woman while confined, consistent with her gender dysphoria, which had been confirmed by two Army medical specialists. Such treatment is provided in civilian federal prisons when it is found to be medically necessary, but it is not available in military prisons. The Pentagon policy at the time considered transgender individuals ineligible to serve.

In July, the Federal Bureau of Prisons rejected a request by the Army to transfer Manning from the USDB to a civilian facility for treatment of her gender dysphoria. Instead, the Army kept Manning in military custody and said it would begin rudimentary gender treatment, which could include allowing her to wear female undergarments and possibly receive hormone treatments.

On August 12, 2014, the American Civil Liberties Union (ACLU) and Manning's civilian attorney David Coombs said Manning was not receiving treatment for her gender identity condition as previously approved by Secretary of Defense Chuck Hagel. They notified the USDB, Hagel and other Defense Department officials that a lawsuit would be filed if they did not confirm by September 4 that treatment would be provided. On August 22, Army spokeswoman Lt. Col. Alayne Conway told NBC News, "The Department of Defense has approved a request by Army leadership to provide required medical treatment for an inmate diagnosed with gender dysphoria." Although Conway would not discuss "the medical needs of an individual", she did say, "In general terms, the initial stages of treatment for individuals with gender dysphoria include psychotherapy and elements of the 'real life experience' therapy. Treatment for the condition is highly individualized and generally is sequential and graduated." The Army declined to say when treatment might begin.

In September, Manning filed a lawsuit in federal district court in Washington, D.C., against Secretary of Defense Hagel, claiming she had "been denied access to medically necessary treatment" for gender dysphoria. She sued to be allowed to grow her hair longer and use cosmetics, and to receive hormone treatments "to express her female gender".

=== 2015 ===
On February 12, 2015, USA Today reported that the commandant of the USDB wrote in a February 5 memo, "After carefully considering the recommendation that (hormone treatment) is medically appropriate and necessary, and weighing all associated safety and security risks presented, I approve adding (hormone treatment) to Inmate Manning's treatment plan." According to USA Today, Manning remained a soldier, and the decision to administer hormone therapy was a first for the Army. Manning was not allowed to grow her hair longer. Her ACLU attorney, Chase Strangio, said that the delay in approving her hormone treatment "came with a significant cost to Chelsea and her mental health".

On March 5, in response to Manning's request for an order compelling the military to use pronouns that conform to her chosen gender identity, the U.S. Army Court of Criminal Appeals ruled, "Reference to appellant in all future formal papers filed before this court and all future orders and decisions issued by this court shall either be neutral, e.g., Private First Class Manning or appellant, or employ a feminine pronoun."

On March 14, the digital library host Cryptome posted an unsigned public copy of a court document, filed March 10, wherein the parties to Manning's September 2014 lawsuit against Secretary of Defense Hagel agreed to stay proceedings for seven months, after which time they would address how the litigation should proceed in light of Manning's status at that time. The document revealed that the Army was then providing Manning with weekly psychotherapy, including psychotherapy specific to gender dysphoria; cross-sex hormone therapy; female undergarments; the ability to wear prescribed cosmetics in her daily life at the USDB; and speech therapy.

In April 2015, Amnesty International posted online a letter from Manning in which she said:

I finally began my prescribed regime of hormones to continue my overdue gender transition in February. It's been such an amazing relief for my body and brain to finally come into alignment with each other. My stress and anxiety levels have tapered off quite considerably. Overall, things are beginning to move along nicely.

=== 2016–2018 ===
On September 13, 2016, the ACLU announced that the army would be granting Manning's request for gender transition surgery, a first for a transgender inmate. In December, Manning's attorneys reported that her military doctor refused Manning's request to change the gender on her military records to female.

In January 2017, Manning wrote to The New York Times that although months had passed, she had still not seen a surgeon. At the time of Manning's release from prison in May 2017, her attorney stressed that she would be pursuing her own medical care and "building her life on her own terms, separate from the military". Manning subsequently stated via her verified Twitter account that her healthcare from the military had stopped on May 16, 2017, and that she had secured a private health plan. She said her gender transition while in prison had cost "only $600 over 2 years", explaining that the Department of Defense "got meds at a markdown". Although the Army had agreed in September 2016 to allow her to have gender transition surgery, the operation was not performed before her release.

On May 22, 2017, Manning's 2014 lawsuit seeking a federal court to order the Defense Department to provide hormone therapy and other treatment for her gender identity condition was dismissed because, her ACLU attorney explained, "she is free".

On October 20, 2018, Manning tweeted a photograph of herself in a hospital bed reportedly recovering from gender reassignment surgery. "After almost a decade of fighting," she wrote, "thru prison, the courts, a hunger strike, and thru the insurance company—I finally got surgery this week". In March 2019, in the context of medical care provided during her re-incarceration, the news media continued to report that she had undergone gender reassignment surgery. In a declaration to the United States District Court for the Eastern District of Virginia filed on May 6, 2019, Manning formally attested that she underwent gender confirmation surgery in October 2018.

== Prison life ==
In March 2015, Bloomberg News reported that Manning could be visited by only those she had named before her imprisonment, and not by journalists. She could not be photographed or give interviews on camera. Manning was not allowed to browse the web, but could consult print news and have access to new gender theory texts.

In April 2015, Amnesty International posted online a letter from Manning in which she described her daily life. "My days here are busy and very routine", she wrote. "I am taking college correspondence courses for a bachelor's degree. I also work out a lot to stay fit, and read newspapers, magazines and books to keep up-to-date on current events around the world and learn new things."

Also that month, Cosmopolitan published the first interview with Manning in prison, conducted by mail. Cosmo reported that Manning was optimistic about recent progress but said that not being allowed to grow her hair long was "painful and awkward ... I am torn up. I get through each day okay, but at night, when I'm alone in my room, I finally burn out and crash." Manning said it was "very much a relief" to announce that she is a woman and did not fear the public response. "Honestly, I'm not terribly worried about what people out there might think of me. I just try to be myself." According to Cosmo, Manning had her own cell with "two tall vertical windows that face the sun", and could see "trees and hills and blue sky and all the things beyond the buildings and razor wire". Manning denied being harassed by other inmates and claimed some had become confidantes.

=== Writing ===
In February 2015, Katharine Viner, editor-in-chief of Guardian US, announced that Manning had joined The Guardian as a contributing opinion writer on war, gender, and freedom of information. In 2014, The Guardian had published two op-eds by Manning: "How to make Isis fall on its own sword" (September 16) and, "I am a transgender woman and the government is denying my civil rights" (December 8). Manning's debut article under the new arrangement, "The CIA's torturers and the leaders who approved their actions must face the law", appeared on March 9, 2015.

In April 2015, Manning began communicating via Twitter, under the handle @xychelsea, by using a voice phone to dictate to intermediaries, who tweeted on her behalf.

=== Suicide attempts ===
On July 5, 2016, Manning was taken to a hospital after a suicide attempt. On July 28, 2016, the ACLU announced that Manning was under investigation and facing several possible charges related to her suicide attempt. She was not allowed to have legal representation at the disciplinary hearing for these charges. At the hearing, held on September 22, she was sentenced to 14 days in solitary confinement, with seven of those days suspended indefinitely. Manning emerged from solitary confinement on October 12, after serving seven days; she said that she was not given the opportunity to appeal the ruling before being placed in solitary.

In an article following her recovery, entitled "Moving On", Manning reflected on her change in identity, wishing people to see her no longer as "Chelsea Manning, formerly Bradley Manning, a US Army Soldier ... convicted", but as a person. She used a selfie from 2008 to accompany the article.

In November 2016, Manning disclosed that she made a second suicide attempt on October 4, 2016, on the first night of her solitary confinement.

=== Hunger strike ===
On September 9, 2016, Manning began a hunger strike to protest what she described as her being bullied by prison authorities and the U.S. government. On September 13, the ACLU announced that Manning had ended the five-day hunger strike after the Army agreed to provide gender transition surgery. The operation, however, was not performed before her release from prison in May 2017.

== 2017–present ==
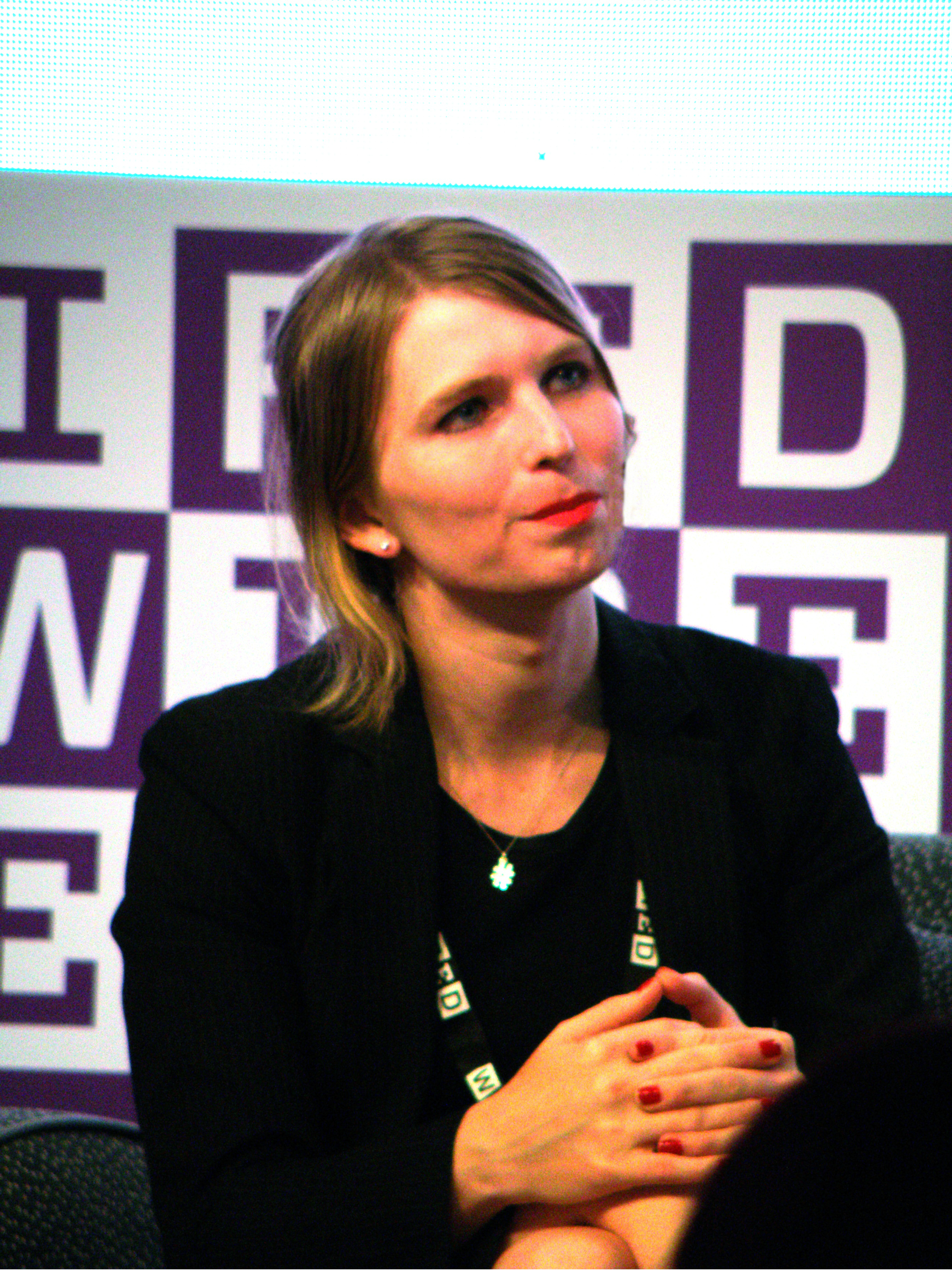
Chelsea Manning interviewed at Wired Next Festival 2018 in Milan

In a June 9, 2017, appearance on Good Morning America, her first interview following her release, Manning said she "accepted responsibility" for her actions, and thanked former President Obama for giving her "another chance". She now earns a living through speaking engagements.

=== Harvard visiting fellowship and rescindment ===
On September 13, 2017, Manning was named a visiting fellow at Harvard University. Bill Delahunt, acting director of the Harvard Institute of Politics, said: "Broadening the range and depth of opportunity for students to hear from and engage with experts, leaders and policy-shapers is a cornerstone of the Institute of Politics. We welcome the breadth of thought-provoking viewpoints on race, gender, politics and the media." Harvard said Manning would visit for a limited number of events meant to spark campus discussion, and in particular would engage students in discourse on "issues of LGBTQ identity in the military". According to online newspaper PinkNews, this marked "the only LGBT-related fellowship in Harvard history".

The next day Michael Morell, former deputy director and twice acting director of the Central Intelligence Agency (CIA), resigned as a nonresident senior fellow at Harvard's Belfer Center for Science and International Affairs. "Unfortunately," Morell wrote, "I cannot be part of an organization—The Kennedy School—that honors a convicted felon and leaker of classified information ... the Kennedy School's decision will assist Ms. Manning in her long-standing effort to legitimize the criminal path that she took to prominence, an attempt that may encourage others to leak classified information as well." Later that day, CIA director Mike Pompeo advised the university that he supported Morell's decision, and withdrew from his scheduled public appearance that evening at Harvard's Kennedy School. Calling Manning an "American traitor", Pompeo wrote: "While I have served my country as a soldier in the United States Army and will continue to defend Ms. Manning's right to offer a defense of why she chose this path, I believe it is shameful for Harvard to place its stamp of approval upon her treasonous actions."

On September 15, 2017, Douglas Elmendorf, dean of the Kennedy School, announced that Manning had been invited to spend only a single day at the school and that her title of visiting fellow did not convey a special honor. "We did not intend to honor her in any way", Elmendorf wrote, "or to endorse any of her words or deeds .... However, I now think that designating Chelsea Manning as a Visiting Fellow was a mistake, for which I accept responsibility. ... Therefore, we are withdrawing the invitation to her to serve as a Visiting Fellow—and the perceived honor that it implies to some people—while maintaining the invitation for her to spend a day at the Kennedy School and speak in the Forum. I apologize to her and to the many concerned people from whom I have heard today for not recognizing upfront the full implications of our original invitation." When Elmendorf phoned Manning, a member of her support team challenged him to explain why Harvard was so concerned about the title "visiting fellow". The team was alienated by his response, which they inferred suggested she had nothing to contribute. Manning then hung up on the dean.

On September 17, 2017, during a public appearance at The Nantucket Project in Massachusetts, Manning said: "I'm not ashamed of being disinvited. I view that just as much of an honored distinction as the fellowship itself." She added, "This is a military intelligence and it is a police state in which we can no longer engage in actual political discourse in our institutions."

=== Denied entry to Canada ===
On September 22, 2017, Manning was denied entry to Canada from the United States because of her criminal record. According to a letter from Canadian immigration officials, posted online by Manning, she is inadmissible due to being convicted of offenses equivalent to treason in Canada. Manning told Reuters that she had planned to vacation in Montreal and Vancouver, but was stopped at a Quebec border crossing by the Canada Border Services Agency on the evening of September 21 and detained overnight. She said she would retain a Canadian lawyer to challenge the inadmissibility finding before a Canadian tribunal. In October 2021, appearing virtually at an Immigration and Refugee Board hearing to determine her admissibility, Manning called the four-year process to visit Canada "exhausting". When questioned by the adjudicator, Manning did not go into detail about what she leaked because she is bound by a non-disclosure agreement with the U.S. government. (Note: During an October 8, 2017, appearance at The New Yorker Festival, Manning said she is legally unable to speak about certain details concerning her leaks, confirming a July 2017 post from her verified Twitter account saying "technically, i cant [sic] read, comment on, discuss, or even look at any leaked material, even if it was after 2010".) The two-day hearing concluded with the adjudicator indicating a final written decision could be expected in 2022.

On April 8, 2022, Canada's Immigration and Refugee Board upheld the government's decision to bar Manning's entry.

=== U.S. Senate candidacy ===
On January 11, 2018, Manning filed with the Federal Election Commission to run for the U.S. Senate in Maryland. On January 18, Manning filed with the Maryland State Board of Elections to challenge the state's senior senator, two-term incumbent Ben Cardin, as a Democrat in the June 26, 2018, primary election.

On February 1, The Washington Post raised questions about Manning's eligibility to run: "While her case is on appeal, she is on a technical form of unpaid active duty, putting her political campaign at odds with Department of Defense regulations that prohibit military personnel from seeking public office." Military law expert Eugene R. Fidell of Yale Law School considered it unlikely the Army would take action against her, saying, "Services don't like to create martyrs." On February 2, Manning commented: "This is an issue that's cropped up mostly from the conservative blogosphere, and the campaign and we don't believe this is an issue at all. ... I've been issued a dishonorable discharge, and I'm not sure where the issue lies in this case." She also confirmed that she was still appealing her court-martial sentence.

In mid-February, she said she had no plans to run television ads, explaining, "I can't stand watching campaign ads. We don't need to go to these old-media methods." Commenting on her opponent, 74-year-old incumbent Ben Cardin, she stated, "He's old hat. He's kept this establishment going."

In May, Manning told the Associated Press that she did not, in fact, consider herself a Democrat, but wanted to shake up establishment Democrats who were "caving in" to President Trump. The AP noted that, despite having raised $72,000 during the first quarter (compared to the incumbent's $336,000), "The candidate has barely made an effort at tapping sources of grassroots enthusiasm outside of activism circles. And it's easy to find progressive Democrats who feel her candidacy is just a vehicle to boost her profile." Manning said she would not run as an independent should her primary bid fail.

On June 26, 2018, Manning finished second among eight Democrats vying for their party's US Senate nomination in Maryland's primary election. Manning received 5.8% of the votes. Incumbent Ben Cardin won renomination with 80.4% of the votes cast.

Shortly after the polls closed, Manning posted a statement on her campaign website. "Over the past several months," she wrote, "it has become clear that my experiences have taken an enormous toll on my physical and emotional health. I stepped back from campaigning to prioritize my own well-being." She thanked "the more than one thousand individual donors who generously contributed to our campaign", and "our team of hundreds of volunteers". But, she added, "after spending hours and hours knocking on doors and making phone calls, I'm convinced that the change people truly need goes beyond what our corrupt two-party system is willing to offer".

=== Interactions with far-right social media figures ===
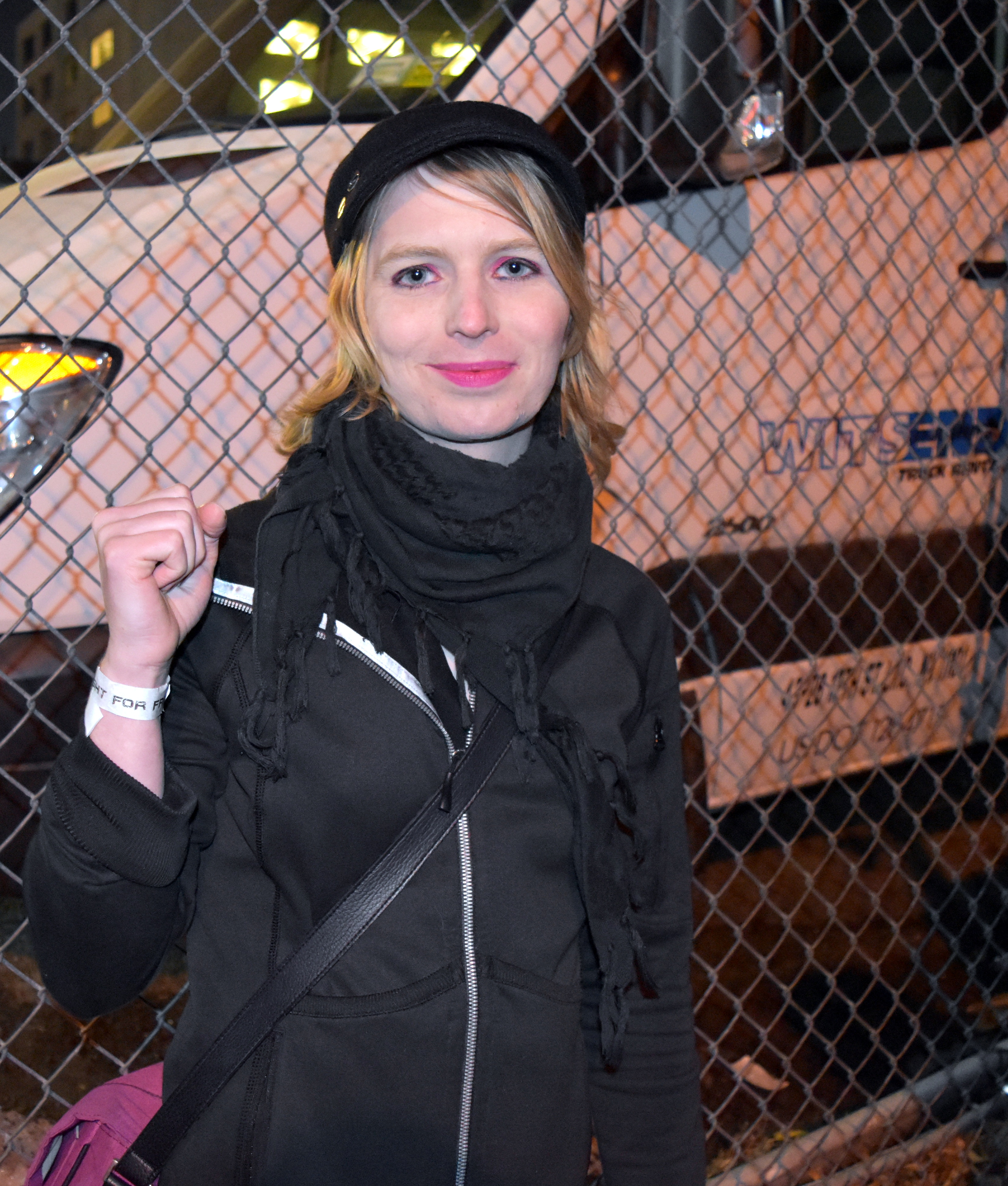
Manning outside "A Night for Freedom" January 20, 2018

On January 20, 2018, Manning attended "A Night for Freedom" hosted by far-right social media personality Mike Cernovich at the nightclub FREQ in Hell's Kitchen, Manhattan. The party was billed, in Cernovich's words, as a "gathering of patriots and political dissidents who are bored with mainstream political events", and included right-wing figures such as Gavin McInnes, James O'Keefe, Lucian Wintrich, and Jack Posobiec. According to The Washington Post, Manning's attendance infuriated the far-left. "What followed," The Post reported, "was an overheated Internet tug-of-war between opposite sides of the political spectrum, each accusing the other of co-opting Manning, while her intentions were relentlessly picked apart." Manning afterward stated that she was acting as a double agent, infiltrating the alt-right to gather information and insight about alt-right rally plans. It later emerged that Manning participated with Cassandra Fairbanks (an admirer and writer for the right-wing website The Gateway Pundit), Posobiec, Wintrich, and others in Escape the Room DC, and spent an evening drinking and playing Cards Against Humanity at Wintrich's apartment with him, Fairbanks, and others. Manning repeated her intentions to gain information about the alt-right, but apologised to her supporters who felt betrayed.

=== Tour of Australia and New Zealand ===
In August 2018, the Government of Australia refused to issue Manning a visa to enter the country, where she was scheduled to make a series of public appearances. The company arranging Manning's speaking tour said it would appeal the decision, taken under s501(1) of the Migration Act, which authorizes a minister to refuse a visa on character grounds. The Department of Home Affairs specified that Manning did not pass the character test because of her "substantial criminal record". On September 2, Manning spoke as scheduled at the Sydney Opera House except that she appeared onscreen live via satellite from Los Angeles.

On August 31, 2018, Immigration New Zealand granted Manning special direction to apply for a work visa to enter New Zealand, stating there was "no reason to believe Ms Manning would not comply with the terms and conditions of any visa issued". Due to her previous convictions for espionage and other offenses, Manning is subject to character provisions of the Immigration Act. Manning had plans to tour Auckland and Wellington on September 8 and 9. Prime Minister Jacinda Ardern defended the New Zealand Government's decision to allow Manning entry, stating that "we are a nation that allows free speech". By contrast, the center-right National Party had called for Manning to be banned from entering New Zealand on national security grounds due to her espionage and computer-fraud convictions.

In August 2021, Forbes reported that Manning had been contracted to conduct an information security audit with Nym Technologies, a Swiss cryptocurrency and VPN startup "to send data anonymously around the Internet using the same blockchain technology underlying Bitcoin".

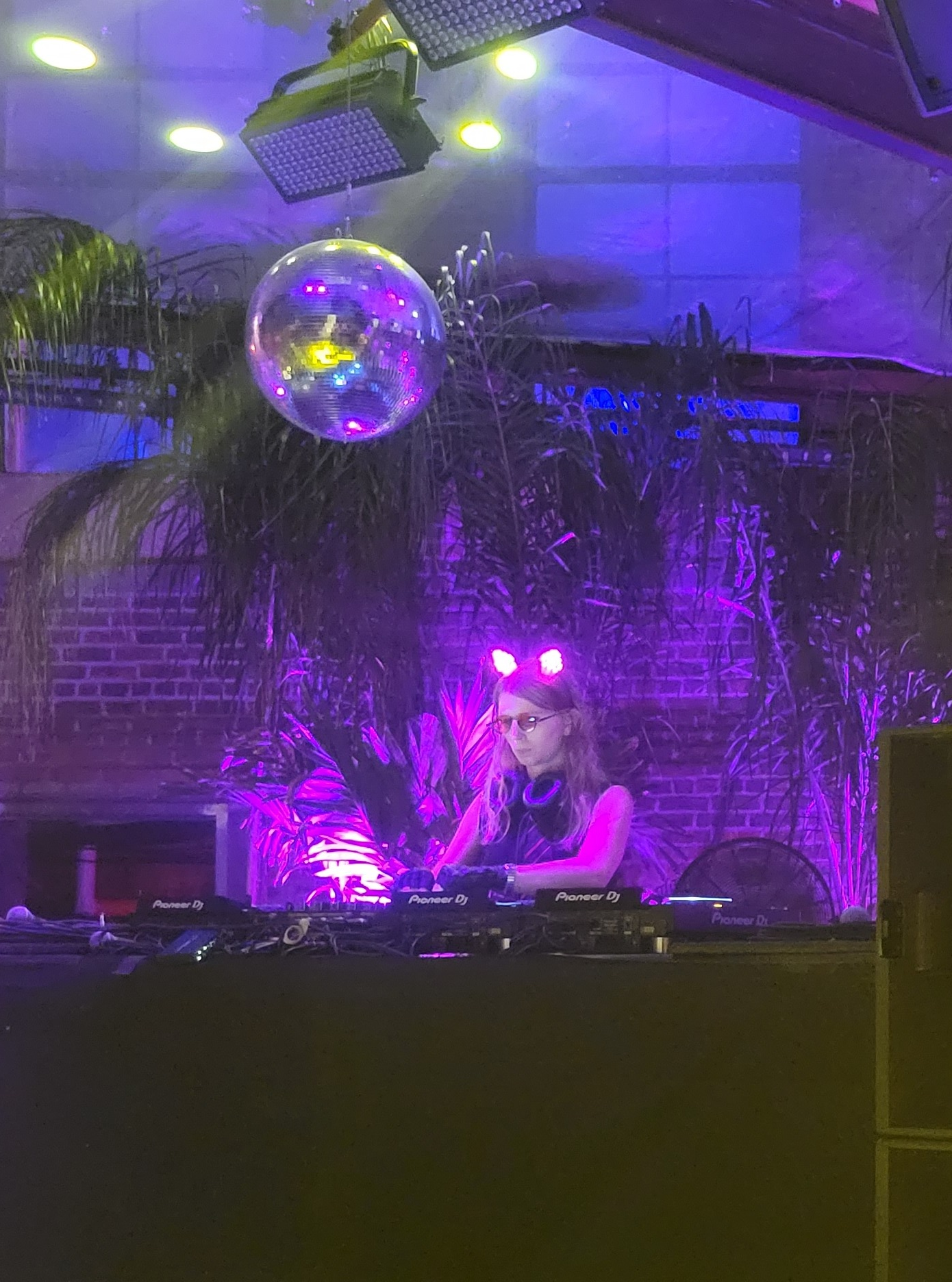
Manning performing a DJ set at Knockdown Center for Bushwig 2023

=== README.txt book ===
In May 2019, Manning announced that Farrar, Straus & Giroux would publish her memoir. She said it would be primarily a personal narrative that would not relitigate the facts of her case. The book, README.txt, was published in 2022. It focuses on Manning's early adulthood, Army career, and early gender transition. During an interview about the book, Manning said:

I wanted to put down in writing the context of who I am, my whole life, my life story—from my perspective as much as possible. Obviously, it's in the context of people's interest in certain events. But I am an all-encompassing human being, and I didn't come from a vacuum. I was shaped into the person I've become. And I wanted to sketch that out, give people an idea of my own background, my own story. It's been called a memoir but I think of it more as a coming-of-age story.

=== Activism ===
In December 2024, Manning was one of 15 protesters arrested at a "sit-in" at a women's bathroom across from the Washington, D.C., office of U.S. House Speaker Mike Johnson. The protest was organized by Gender Liberation Movement in response to House Resolution 1579, which would ban bathroom access for transgender people in federal buildings.

On April 13, 2026, Manning and nearly 100 other protesters were arrested at a pro-Palestine action targeting arms sales to Israel outside the offices of New York senators Chuck Schumer and Kirsten Gillibrand. The protest was organized with the anti-Zionist advocacy group Jewish Voice for Peace. Actors Hari Nef and Hannah Einbinder also participated. Manning and more than 100 other protesters were arrested at a September 2026 protest of a speech by Israeli prime minister Benjamin Netanyahu at the United Nations General Assembly.

=== DJing ===
Before her arrest in 2010, Manning was known to DJ on occasion. She has returned to DJing as of August 2022. In July 2026 she was seen at a New York Democratic Socialists of America chapter event at a bar in Crown Heights, Brooklyn. She has reportedly become a regular presence (and periodic DJ) at NY DSA events.

== See also ==
- Information security
- Information sensitivity
- LGBT people in prison
- List of people pardoned or granted clemency by the president of the United States
- McCarran Internal Security Act of 1950
- Reception of WikiLeaks
- The Source (oratorio)
- Ai Weiwei: Yours Truly

== Bibliography ==
=== Books ===
- Brooke, Heather (2012). The Revolution Will be Digitised: Dispatches from the Information War. London: Windmill Books. ISBN 978-0-09-953808-0. OCLC 794295988.
- Domscheit-Berg, Daniel (2011). Inside Wikileaks: My time with Julian Assange at the world's most dangerous website. New York: Doubleday. ISBN 978-0-307-95191-5. OCLC 701412231.
- Fowler, Andrew (2011). The Most Dangerous Man in the World: How One Hacker Ended Corporate and Government Secrecy Forever. New York: Skyhorse Publishing. ISBN 978-1-61608-489-9. OCLC 706021712.
- Leigh, David; Harding, Luke (2011). Wikileaks: Inside Julian Assange's War on Secrecy. Guardian Books. ISBN 978-1-61039-062-0. OCLC 708581074.
- Nicks, Denver (2012). Private: Bradley Manning, WikiLeaks, and the Biggest Exposure of Official Secrets in American History. Chicago Review Press. ISBN 978-1-61374-069-9. OCLC 794491750.

=== Key articles ===
- Caesar, Ed. "Bradley Manning: Wikileaker" Archived May 14, 2013, at the Wayback Machine, The Sunday Times, December 19, 2010; from the original on April 7, 2012.
- Fishman, Steve. "Bradley Manning's Army of One", New York Magazine, July 3, 2011.
- Greenwald, Glenn (June 18, 2010). "The strange and consequential case of Bradley Manning, Adrian Lamo and WikiLeaks". Salon. Archived from the original on October 16, 2011.
- Last, Jonathan V. "The Left's Canonization of St. Bradley Manning", CBS News, January 11, 2011.
- Manning, Bradley. "Memorandum", released by David Coombs, March 10, 2011; archived from the original on April 6, 2012.
- Manning, Bradley. "PFC Manning's statement redacted", January 29, 2013.
- Nakashima, Ellen. "Bradley Manning is at the center of the WikiLeaks controversy. But who is he?", The Washington Post, May 4, 2011; from the original on April 7, 2012.
- Nicks, Denver. "Private Manning and the Making of Wikileaks", This Land, September 23, 2010.
- PBS Frontline. "Bradley Manning's Facebook Page", March 2011; archived from the original on April 7, 2011.
- Smith, Martin. "The Private Life of Bradley Manning", PBS Frontline, March 7, 2011 (interview transcripts: "Brian Manning" and "Jordan Davis").
- Thompson, Ginger (August 8, 2010). "Early Struggles of Soldier Charged in Leak Case". The New York Times. p. 1. Archived from the original on March 14, 2020.
- Zetter, Kim (December 19, 2011). "Jolt in WikiLeaks Case: Feds Found Manning-Assange Chat Logs on Laptop". Wired.

=== Key articles on the Lamo–Manning chat log, in order of publication ===
- Poulsen, Kevin (May 20, 2010). "Ex-hacker Adrian Lamo Institutionalized for Asperger's". Wired. Archived from the original on May 23, 2010.
- Poulsen, Kevin; Zetter, Kim (June 6, 2010). "U.S. Intelligence Analyst Arrested in WikiLeaks Video Probe". Wired. Archived from the original on October 27, 2013.
- Poulsen, Kevin; Zetter, Kim (June 10, 2010). "'I Can't Believe What I'm Confessing to You': The WikiLeaks Chats". Wired.
- Nakashima, Ellen. "Messages from alleged leaker Bradley Manning portray him as despondent soldier", The Washington Post, June 10, 2010.
- Greenwald, Glenn (June 14–17, 2010). "Email exchange between Glenn Greenwald and Kevin Poulsen". UTDocuments. Archived from the original on May 12, 2013 – via Blogspot.
- Poulsen, Kevin; Zetter, Kim (June 16, 2010). "Three Weeks After Arrest, Still No Charges in WikiLeaks Probe". Wired. Archived from the original on June 19, 2010.
- Jardin, Xeni (June 19, 2010). "WikiLeaks: A somewhat less redacted version of the Lamo/Manning logs". Boing Boing.
- Greenwald, Glenn (December 27, 2010). "The worsening journalistic disgrace at Wired". Salon. Archived from the original on September 2, 2011.
- Hansen, Evan; Poulsen, Kevin (December 28, 2010). "Putting the Record Straight on the Lamo-Manning Chat Logs". Wired.
- Poulsen, Kevin (December 28, 2010). "Putting the Record Straight on the Lamo-Manning Chat Logs". Wired.
- Hansen; Poulsen, Kevin (December 28, 2010). "Putting the Record Straight on the Lamo-Manning Chat Logs". Wired.
- Greenwald, Glenn (December 29, 2010). "Wired's refusal to release or comment on the Manning chat logs". Salon. Archived from the original on January 26, 2011.
- Firedoglake. "Manning/WikiLeaks timeline", published as a complete version of the released excerpts. Retrieved March 14, 2011; from the original on March 28, 2012.
- Hansen, Evan. "Manning-Lamo Chat Logs Revealed", Wired, July 13, 2011; from the original on March 28, 2012.
