= README.txt (book) =

2022 memoir by Chelsea Manning

README.txt: A Memoir
- First edition
- Author: Chelsea Manning
- Language: English
- Genre: non-fiction
- Publisher: Farrar, Straus and Giroux
- Publication date: October 18, 2022
- Publication place: United States
- Pages: 272
- ISBN: 978-0-374-27927-1

README.txt: A Memoir is a 2022 memoir by Chelsea Manning. It covers her early life, experience as a soldier in the U.S. Army, and life and imprisonment after she leaked classified information to WikiLeaks.

In the memoir, she explains that her boss, in late 2009, had recommended a State Department Net-Centric Diplomacy portal with its "trove of diplomatic cables" as possibly "useful to us in our analytical work. I read every single one that related to Iraq, and then began to poke around in the rest of the database..." On February 21, 2010, she leaked "what would become known as the 'Collateral Murder' tape, which showed grainy aerial footage from July 2007 of an Apache helicopter air strike gone horribly wrong."

== Reviews ==
Writing for The New York Times, reviewer Margaret Sullivan characterised the prose as "vivid", with the tale that is told being "troubling to read" yet "uplifting as well". She concludes that the work is also quite a "frightening cautionary tale". In his review for The Guardian, Stuart Jeffries states that he believes that it "takes extraordinary qualities to do some of the things she recounts in this book", ultimately concluding that "Chelsea Manning has become a new kind of American heroine".
