= David Coombs (lawyer) =

- Coombs in 2009
- Born: David Edward Coombs; July 6, 1969 (age 57); Boise, Idaho, U.S.
- Occupations: Lawyer, professor

David Edward Coombs (born July 6, 1969) is a United States military defense counsel known for his role in several high-profile cases.

Coombs spent twelve years on active duty service with the United States Army Judge Advocate General's Corps. During this time, he was an acting chief of military justice, senior capital defense counsel, judicial advisor for the Iraqi Central Criminal Court, and was certified as a military judge.

He was professor of law at The Judge Advocate General's Legal Center and School (TJAGLCS) in Charlottesville, Virginia during 2006–2009, and in 2007 he was a co-supervisor in the University of Virginia Law Extramural (Moot Court) Advocacy Team. Since his promotion to lieutenant colonel, he has continued to teach trial advocacy and criminal law at TJAGLCS as a reserve officer.

Coombs also was an adjunct law professor of criminal procedure, evidence, and trial advocacy at the Roger Williams University School of Law in Bristol, Rhode Island until 2023. There he also served as the faculty advisor to the Military Law Society.

From 2003 to 2005, he served as one of four defense counselors in the United States v. Sergeant Hasan Akbar case, a matter which received wide coverage.

In 2008, Coombs was a judicial advisor in support of the Law and Order Task Force in Baghdad, where he was responsible for mentoring and assisting Iraqi prosecutors and judges.

In 2009, Coombs left active duty service and began a private practice specializing in defending members of the United States Army. From 2010 to 2013, he represented U.S. Army Private First Class Chelsea Manning, who was convicted of improper release of classified information to WikiLeaks. He continued to represent Manning until her release in 2017, after President Obama commuted her sentence.

In 2023, he joined University at Buffalo School of Law as a lecturer in both the undergraduate and JD programs. He teaches Evidence, Military Justice, Criminal Procedure, and National Security Law.

== Publications ==
- "Uncharged Misconduct – The Edge is Never Dull", The Army Lawyer, May 2007
- Dictionary of Common Evidentiary Issues, The Judge Advocate General's Legal Center and School (TJAGLCS), 2007, 2008
- Advanced Evidence Deskbook, The Judge Advocate General's Legal Center and School (TJAGLCS) 2006–2008.
- "Pass Go, Collect $200.00, and Hire Yourself an Expert – Article 46 and the Right to Expert Assistance", The Army Lawyer, June 2008
- "United States v. Blazier: So Exactly Who Needs an Invitation to the Dance?", The Army Lawyer, July 2010
