= Anything to Say? =

2015 sculpture by Davide Dormino

Anything to Say? – A Monument to Courage
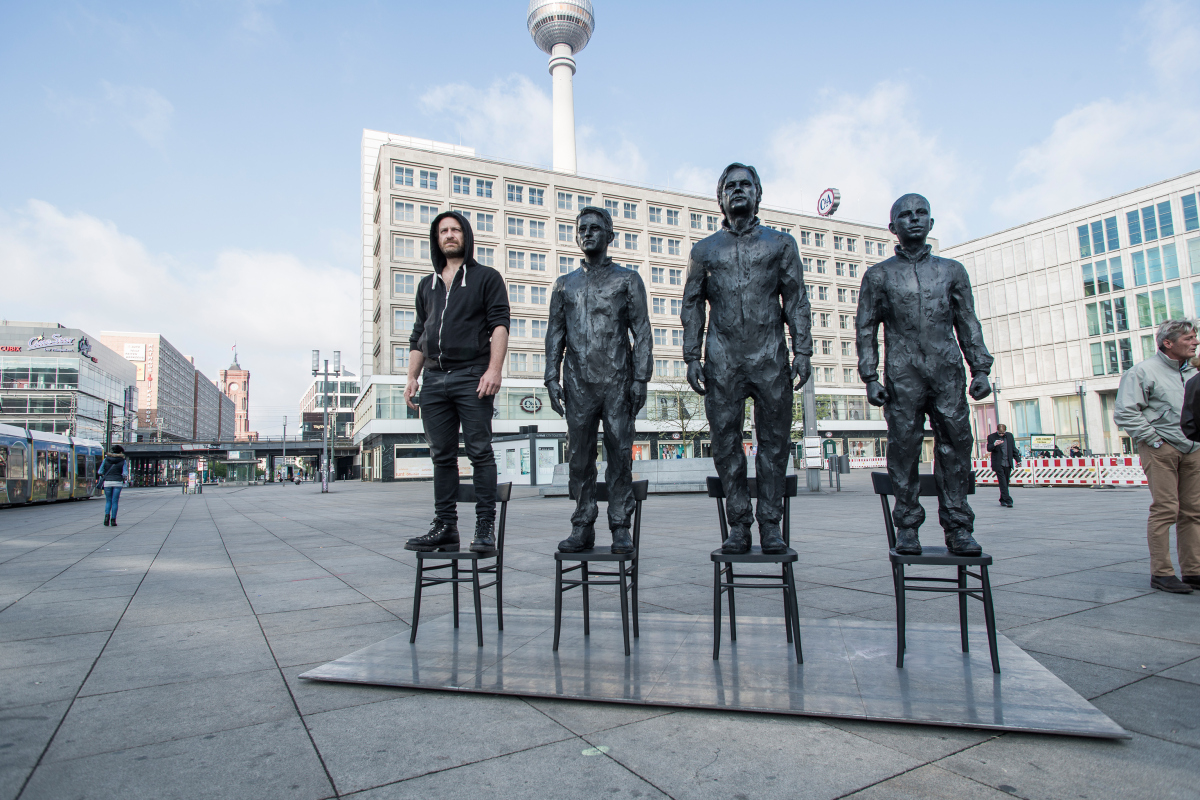
- The sculpture in Berlin's Alexanderplatz on May Day 2015
- Artist: Davide Dormino
- Year: 2015
- Type: Sculpture
- Medium: Bronze
- Website: http://www.anythingtosay.com/

Anything to Say? is a travelling bronze sculpture and public art installation by Italian artist Davide Dormino that was erected on May 1, 2015, on Berlin's Alexanderplatz. The full title of the work is Anything to Say? - A Monument to Courage. The whistleblowers Edward Snowden, Julian Assange, and Chelsea Manning are shown standing on three chairs in the installation, which also contains an empty fourth chair that will serve as a platform for public speaking. People are encouraged to "stand up instead of sit like the others" by the fourth empty chair. The installation was unveiled as part of a private art project supported by international crowdfunding. In 2016 Davide Dormino was awarded the Prix Éthique 2016 by Anticor for Anything to Say?

== Message ==
Davide Dormino's sculpture, Anything to say?, symbolizes the courage of whistleblowers and all those who fight to defend freedom of expression and information. It travels from city to city to remind the public about the massive invasions of privacy, the information control, and the disinformation to which they are subjected by governments and corporations, and about their democratic and legitimate right to know.

Julian Assange, Chelsea Manning, and Edward Snowden were chosen as examples of contemporary people who have put themselves in danger in order to reveal information and shed light on events that were hidden or misrepresented. The sculpture is supported by Reporters Without Borders (RSF), an NGO that defends media freedom.

== Geneva – Place des Nations (2015) ==
The sculpture stopped in Geneva during the 30th session of the Human Rights Council, on the Place des Nations from September 14 to 18, 2015, in front of the United Nations building.

== Paris – Georges Pompidou Centre (2015) ==
The Georges Pompidou Centre in Paris displayed the sculpture from September 23 to 29 2015 in the square in front of the centre, where the display was inaugurated on September 23 in the presence of Dormino, Reporters Without Borders secretary-general Christophe Deloire, UBS whistleblower Stéphanie Gibaud, Luc Hermann, an investigative journalist who is one of the directors of the Premières Lignes production company, and Marco Benagli, representing a civil society group that helped fund the project.

The French actress Catherine Deneuve also attended as the inauguration's sponsor. She sat in the sculpture's empty chair and read an address written for the occasion by Irène Frachon, the French specialist who exposed the dangers of the antidiabetic drug Mediator.

== Strasbourg – Place Kléber (2016) ==
The sculpture was displayed in Strasbourg’s Place Kléber from November 16 to 21 2016 as part of the annual Strasbourg World Forum for Democracy. The display was inaugurated on November 17 in the presence of Dormino, Deloire and Luxleaks whistleblower Antoine Deltour.

== Brussels – Place de la Monnaie (2020) ==
The sculpture was displayed in Brussels, Place de la Monnaie, in 2020.

== See also ==
- Crypto-anarchism
- Freedom of information
- Internet privacy
