= Stormy (2024 film) =

2024 American documentary film

- Official poster
- Directed by: Sarah Gibson
- Produced by: Sarah Gibson; Erin Lee Carr; Emelia Brown
- Cinematography: Jonathan Furmanski; Derek Howard; Shiho Fukada; Wolfgang Held
- Edited by: Ben Kaplan; Inbal B. Lessner
- Music by: Jeff Morrow
- Production companies: Imagine Documentaries; Apatow Productions; Carr Lot Productions
- Distributed by: Peacock
- Release dates: March 8, 2024 (SXSW); March 18, 2024
- Running time: 109 minutes
- Country: United States
- Language: English

Stormy is a 2024 American documentary film, directed and produced by Sarah Gibson. It follows Stormy Daniels, as she navigates being a mother, artist, and advocate working hard to reinvent herself following the Stormy Daniels–Donald Trump scandal.

It had its world premiere at South by Southwest on March 8, 2024, and was released on March 18, 2024, by Peacock.

== Premise ==
Stormy Daniels navigates being a mother, artist, and advocate working hard to reinvent herself following the Stormy Daniels–Donald Trump scandal.

== Production ==
Sarah Gibson and Stormy Daniels first met while working on a comedy project. Gibson later reached out to Daniels to do a documentary to which she agreed, as long as the project was not a puff piece and didn't gloss over her life struggles. The film includes footage shot by Denver Nicks for an unreleased documentary.

Erin Lee Carr serves as producer, while Judd Apatow serves as an executive producer under his Apatow Productions banner.

== Release ==
It had its world premiere at South by Southwest on March 8, 2024. It was released on March 18, 2024, by Peacock.

== Reception ==
=== Critical reception ===
On the review aggregator website Rotten Tomatoes, 71% of 14 critics' reviews are positive, with an average rating of 6.3/10. Metacritic, which uses a weighted average, assigned the film a score of 53 out of 100, based on 6 critics, indicating "mixed or average" reviews.

Brian Tallerico of RogerEbert.com wrote: "It’s a successful attempt to strip away the political issues and present its subject as a flesh-and-blood human being, someone with feelings, anxieties, and a great deal of courage." Nick Schager of The Daily Beast wrote: "Fortuitously timed, providing an insider’s view of this most tabloid-y of political tales and the woman at the center of it all."

Conversely, David Ehrlich of IndieWire gave the film a C− writing: "It’s poorly shot, severely lacking in character detail, and much longer than most people would ever need it to be." Daniel Feinberg of The Hollywood Reporter wrote: "This documentary could have been centered around Stormy Daniels today, and it would have been a better and more truthful movie. It wasn’t and it isn’t." The film has additionally been criticized for being "unethical" including footage shot by Denver Nicks, as the two had been romantically involved.
