= Denver Nicks =

American journalist

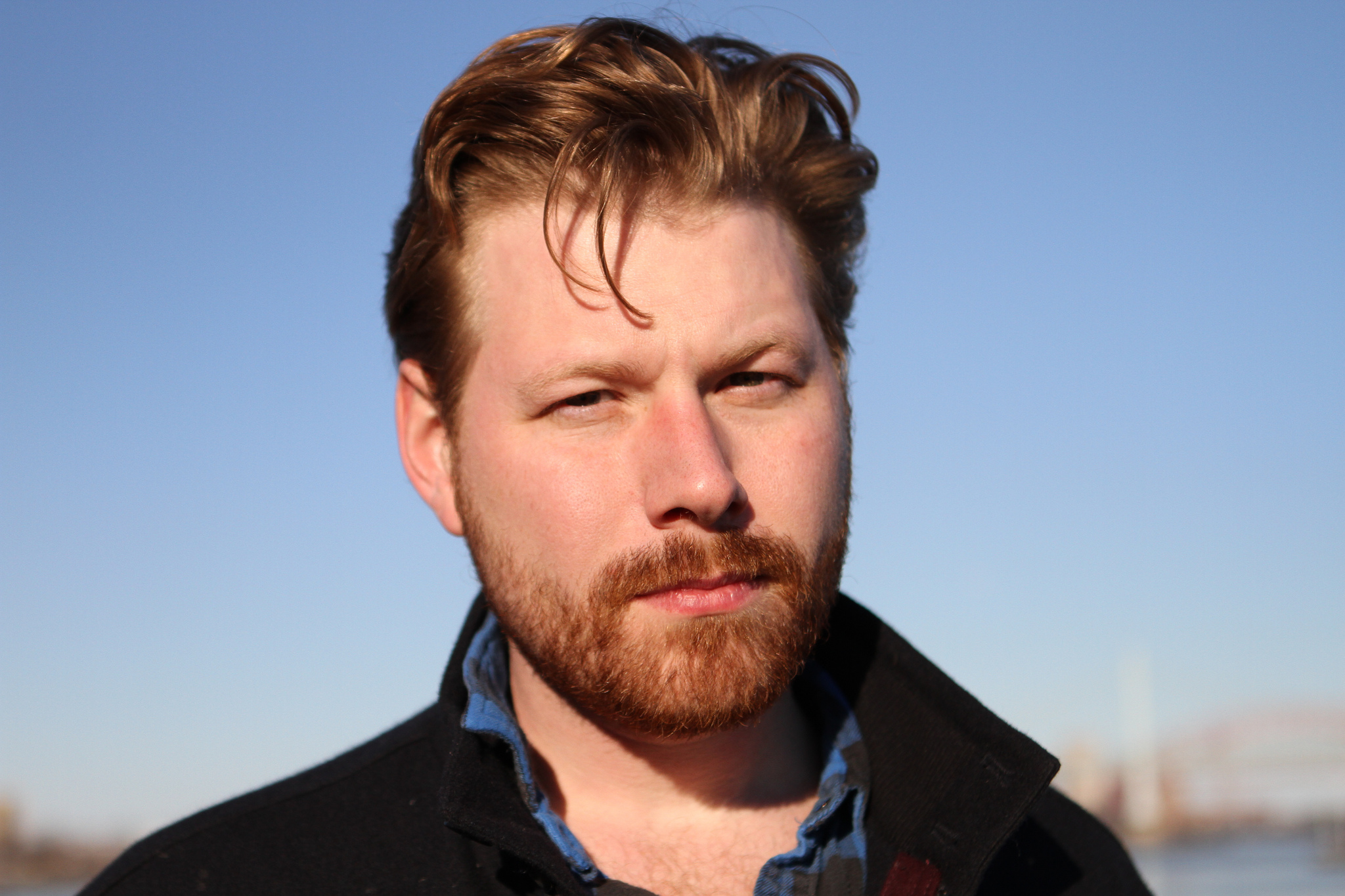
- Nicks in January 2012
- Born: c. 1985 (age 40–41); Tulsa, Oklahoma, U.S.
- Education: Southern Methodist University; Columbia University Graduate School of Journalism

Denver Morrissey Nicks (born c. 1985) is an American journalist, photographer and a staff writer for Time magazine. Nicks' work has appeared in The Nation, The Huffington Post, This Land, and The Daily Beast. He is the author of Private: Bradley Manning, WikiLeaks, and the Biggest Exposure of Official Secrets in American History (2012) and Hot Sauce Nation: America's Burning Obsession (2016).

Nicks is a native of Tulsa, Oklahoma. He currently resides in New York City.

He holds a bachelor's degree in political science and international studies from Southern Methodist University in 2007, and a master's from the Columbia University Graduate School of Journalism in 2010.

In the documentary Stormy, released in March 2024 on Peacock, it is revealed that Nicks began a romantic relationship with Stormy Daniels while shooting footage that was eventually included in the film.
