= Kim Zetter =

American investigative journalist

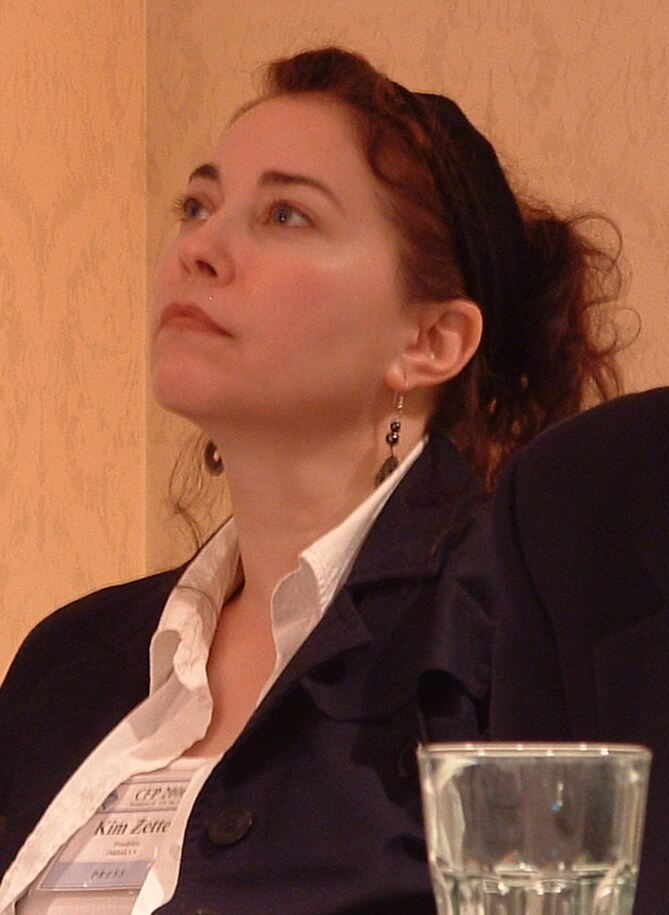
- Zetter at the 2006 Computers, Freedom and Privacy Conference
- Occupation: Journalist
- Writing career
- Subject: Cybersecurity
- Notable works: "Privacy 2000", cover story on PC Magazine
- Notable awards: Maggie Award, IRE Award, Neal Award

Kim Zetter is an American investigative journalist and author who has covered cybersecurity and national security since 1999. She has broken numerous stories over the years about NSA surveillance, WikiLeaks, and the hacker underground, including an award-winning series about the security problems with electronic voting machines. She has three times been voted one of the top ten security journalists in the U.S. by her journalism peers and security professionals. She is considered one of the world's experts on Stuxnet, a malicious computer worm used to sabotage Iran's nuclear program, and published a book on the topic called Countdown to Zero Day: Stuxnet and the Launch of the World's First Digital Weapon.

== Biography ==
Though born in the United States, Zetter got her start as a journalist in Israel, when she was living there for three years. Some of her first articles were written for the Jerusalem Post. She speaks English and Hebrew, and her book on the Kabbalah has been published in multiple languages.

She has written on a wide variety of subjects from the Kabbalah to dining out in San Francisco to Israel to cryptography and electronic voting, and her work has been published in newspapers and magazines all over the world, including the Los Angeles Times, San Francisco Chronicle, Jerusalem Post, San Jose Mercury News, Detroit Free Press, and the Sydney Morning Herald. She has been a staff reporter at Wired, a writer and editor at PC World, and a guest on NPR and CNN.

Zetter has interviewed and written about many notable people including sculptor Jim Sanborn (creator of the CIA's Kryptos sculpture), Ed Scheidt (Chairman of the CIA's Cryptographic Center), Mike Lynn (about the Cisco scandal in 2005), Australian film director Baz Luhrmann, United States Assistant Attorney General Viet Dinh (creator of the Patriot Act), and the famous cryptographer Bruce Schneier.

== Selected articles ==
- Three Minutes with Jeff Moss, April 3, 2001, PC World (interview with the founder of the Def Con and Black Hat security conferences)
- "Baz brings bohemians to the Bay". The Age: Melbourne, Australia. October 18, 2002.
- Zetter, Kim (August 25, 2003). "BlackBerry Reveals Bank's Secrets". Wired News.
- Zetter, Kim (October 6, 2003). "Time to Recall E-Vote Machines?". Wired News.
- Zetter, Kim (October 13, 2003). "Did E-Vote Firm Patch Election?". Wired News.
- Finley, Klint; Tiku, Nitasha; Lapowsky, Issie; Griffith, Erin; Sohn, Gigi; Fazlullah, Amina; Simonite, Tom (March 29, 2004). "How E-Voting Threatens Democracy". Wired News.
- Zetter, Kim (January 21, 2005). "Solving the Enigma of Kryptos". Wired News.
- Zetter, Kim (August 22, 2005). "Why Racial Profiling Doesn't Work". Salon.com. Archived from the original on July 5, 2012.
- The Secret Seven, Jun 13, 2008, Condé Nast Portfolio
- Zetter, Kim (April 14, 2009). "PIN Crackers Nab Holy Grail of Bank Card Security". Wired News.
- Zetter, Kim (May 2, 2023). "SolarWinds: The Untold Story of the Boldest Supply-Chain Hack". Wired.

== Awards ==
- 2005, Maggie Award (Western Publications Association), Best Web Article/Consumer, for "How E-Voting Threatens Democracy"
- 2004, IRE Awards (Investigative Reporters and Editors), Finalist, Online category, for "Machine Politics" (E-voting series)
- 2002, Maggie Award (Western Publications Association), Best Online Interview/Profile, for "Three Minutes with Hacker Fosdick"
- 2000, Neal Award (American Business Media), Best Single Issue, for "Privacy 2000" (PC Magazine - edited cover story)
- 2000, ASBPE (American Society of Business Publication Editors), National Silver Award, Best Original Web Feature, for "What Makes Johnny - and Jane - Write Viruses?"
- 2000, ASBPE (American Society of Business Publication Editors), West Coast Bronze, Best Feature Story, for "Spam! How It Happens and How to Beat It" (edited)

== Books ==
- Simple Kabbalah: A Simple Wisdom Book, 2000, Conari Press, ISBN 0-7858-1511-2 (hardback), ISBN 1-57324-170-9 (paperback)
- Cabala: para Viver com Sabedoria no Mundo Moderno, 2005, Nova Era, ISBN 85-7701-008-2
- Lonely Planet Out to Eat: San Francisco, Lonely Planet Publications, ISBN 1-74059-270-0 (2002 edition), ISBN 1-86450-084-0 (2000 edition)
- Countdown to Zero Day: Stuxnet and the Launch of the World's First Digital Weapon, 2014, Crown, ISBN 0-77043-617-X
