= Ai Weiwei: Yours Truly =

2019 documentary film about Ai Weiwei

- Film poster
- Directed by: Cheryl Haines; Gina Leibrecht
- Produced by: John Caulkins et al.
- Starring: Ai Weiwei; Dan Ai; Atteyat Ghanny
- Cinematography: Dana Smillie; Jan Stürmann
- Edited by: Gina Leibrecht
- Music by: Wendy Blackstone
- Release date: 14 April 2019 (San Francisco International Film Festival)
- Running time: 76 minutes
- Country: United States
- Languages: English, Mandarin, Arabic
- Budget: $550,000 (estimated)

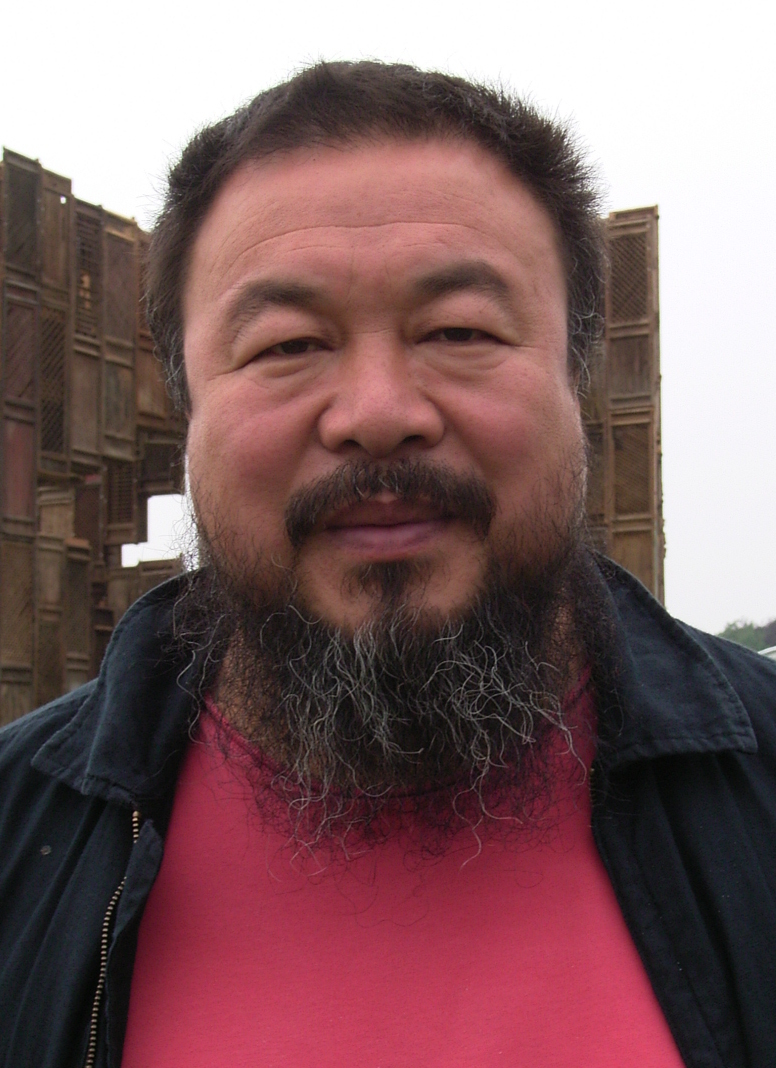
Ai Weiwei

Ai Weiwei: Yours Truly is a 2019 American documentary film about the Chinese artist and activist Ai Weiwei, and his art exhibition at Alcatraz, a former prison on an island near San Francisco, California, USA.

The documentary covers the creation of the exhibition @Large:Ai Weiwei on Alcatraz, a 2014 project that was shown at Alcatraz, with multiple exhibits, including Trace, which featured political prisoners around the world as lego portraits. At this time, Ai Weiwei still had his passport withheld by the Chinese government, so foreign travel was not possible for him and he had to create the exhibition remotely. The exhibition came about through contact with the San Francisco curator and gallerist Cheryl Haines.

The film considers human rights. Interviews with Ai Weiwei and his mother demonstrate the psychological effect of the family's exile in the 1950s to a labor camp in northeast China. The exhibition had two main parts. "Trace" was a room with portraits on the floor of 176 people that had imprisoned for their beliefs, created in bright colors using Lego bricks. The second room, "Yours Truly", enabled visitors to write postcards to some of the imprisoned people, which were later sent by mail to the prisoners where this was possible. The film includes interviews with Chelsea Manning, a former United States Army intelligence analyst who leaked military and diplomatic documents in 2010, originally sentenced to 35 years imprisonment by the US government, and John Kiriakou, a former US CIA agent who revealed the CIA's use of torture, especially waterboarding, and imprisoned by the US government during 2013–15 at the time of the exhibition.
