= Women in the United States Coast Guard =

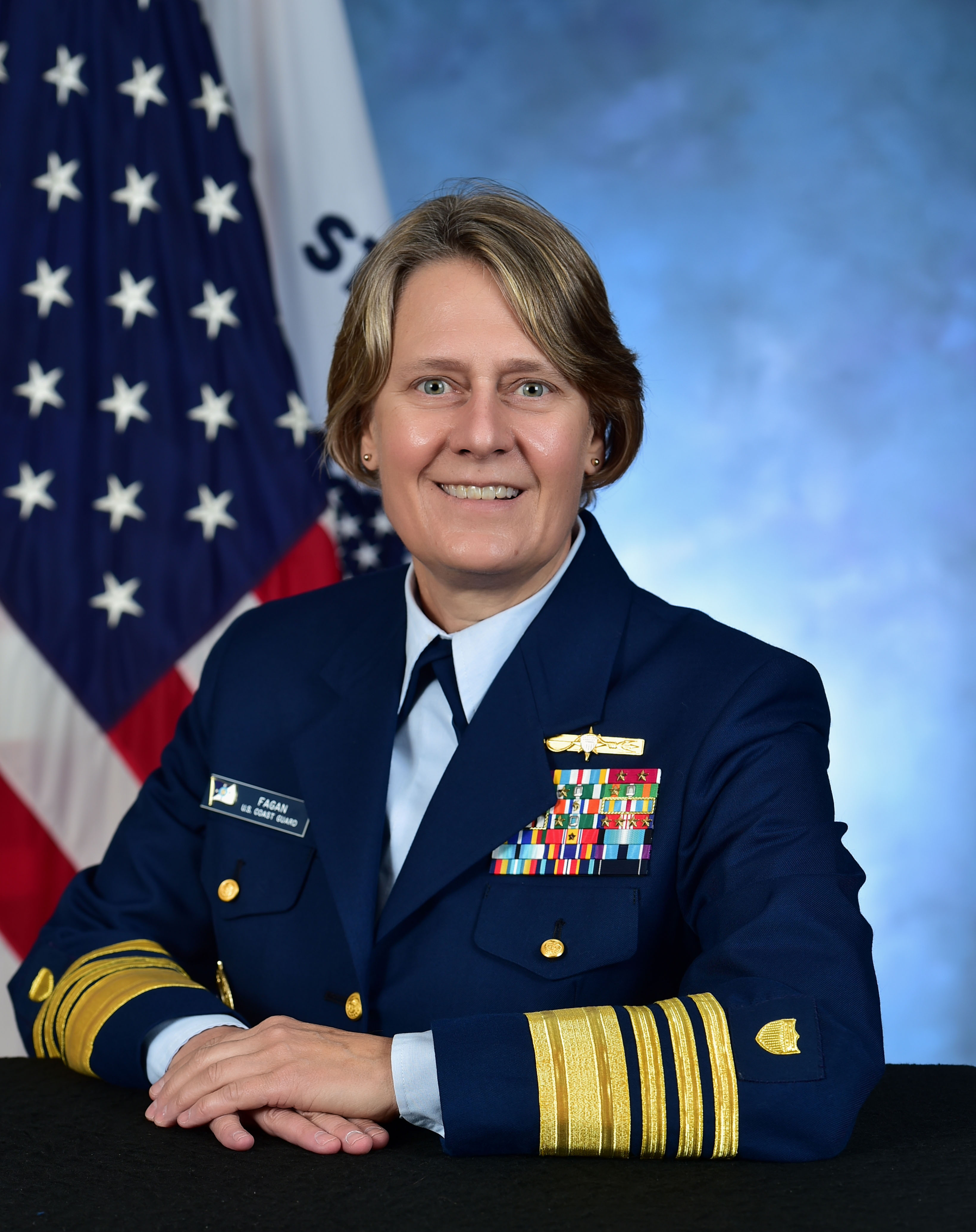
Linda L. Fagan became the first female four-star admiral in the United States Coast Guard in 2021.

There have long been women in the United States Coast Guard, with Myrtle Hazard becoming the first woman to enlist in 1918, and women continue to serve in it today.

== History ==
=== World War I ===
During World War I, in January 1918, Myrtle Hazard became the first woman to enlist in the Coast Guard. She was the only woman to serve in the Coast Guard during World War I. As there was no official women's uniform at the time, she chose her own ensemble, a middy blouse and a blue pleated skirt.

Wartime newspapers erroneously reported that twin sisters Genevieve and Lucille Baker were the first women to serve in the Coast Guard; in fact, while they tried to enlist during the war, they were not accepted.

=== World War II and after until the Korean War ===
On November 23, 1942, the Coast Guard Women's Reserve was created with the signing of Public Law 773 by President Franklin Delano Roosevelt. Dorothy Stratton transferred from the Navy WAVES to serve as the Reserve's director. Dorothy Tuttle was the first woman to enlist in the Coast Guard Women's Reserve, and in all 11,868 enlisted women and 978 female officers served in it during World War II. This included Olivia Hooker, who thus became the first African-American woman to enter the Coast Guard in 1945. In all five African-American women served in the Coast Guard Women's Reserve before it was inactivated in 1947, namely Hooker, D. Winifred Byrd, Julia Mosley, Yvonne Cumberbatch, and Aileen Cooke. The Coast Guard Women's Reserve was inactivated on July 25, 1947, but was reestablished on a much smaller scale in 1949.

=== Korean War and after until the Vietnam War ===
Approximately 200 women who had been in the Coast Guard Women's Reserve reenlisted and served during the Korean War. They mostly served at the Coast Guard Headquarters in Washington, D.C.

=== Vietnam War ===
The Vietnam War gave the Coast Guard a surplus of qualified male applicants, and the Coast Guard did not make a systematic effort to attract women during that time.

=== Women in the Coast Guard since 1972 ===
Frontiero v. Richardson, 411 U.S. 677 (1973), was a landmark Supreme Court case which decided that benefits given by the military to the family of service members cannot be given out differently because of sex. (Note: Technically, the case was decided under the Fifth Amendment's Due Process Clause, not under the Equal Protection Clause of the Fourteenth Amendment, since the latter applies not to the federal government but to the states. However, because Bolling v. Sharpe, through the doctrine of reverse incorporation, made the standards of the Equal Protection Clause applicable to the federal government, it was for practical purposes an addition not to due process, but rather to equal protection jurisprudence.)

In 1973 women were integrated into the active-duty Coast Guard and the Coast Guard Reserve. The Coast Guard Women's Reserve was ended and those in it were sent to the Coast Guard Reserve. On December 7, 1973 Wanda May Parr and Margaret A. Blackman became the first female enlistees sworn into the regular Coast Guard, and Alice T. Jefferson became the first female commissioned officer sworn into the regular Coast Guard.

In 1976 the Coast Guard Academy first admitted women; in 1985 Denise L. Matthews became the first woman to graduate at the top of her class at the Coast Guard Academy.

In 1977 the first Coast Guard women were assigned to sea duty as crew members aboard Morgenthau and Gallatin.

In 1978 the Coast Guard opened all assignments to women.

Beverly Kelley became the first woman to command an American military vessel of any branch of the service, specifically a Coast Guard cutter, the 95-foot patrol boat USCGC Cape Newagen, on April 12, 1979.

Vivien Crea became the first female in the U.S. Armed Forces to serve as a military aide to a President in 1984.

Women in the Coast Guard served in Operation Desert Shield (1990–1991) and Operation Desert Storm (1991).

In 1990, Lane McClelland became the first Women’s Policy Advisor in the Office of Personnel and Training at Coast Guard Headquarters. In 1992, she became the first active duty woman since the existence of the United States Coast Guard Women's Reserve to be promoted to the rank of captain. In 1993, she became the first woman assigned as Chief Trial Judge of the Coast Guard.

Vivien Crea became the first woman to command an air station when she took over Air Station Detroit in 1992.

In 1993 Patricia A. Stolle became the first woman in the Coast Guard to advance to master chief petty officer.

Before the "Don't Ask Don't Tell" policy was enacted in 1993, lesbians and bisexual women (and gay men and bisexual men) were banned from serving in the military. In 1993 the "Don't Ask Don't Tell" policy was enacted, which mandated that the military could not ask servicemembers about their sexual orientation. However, until the policy was ended in 2011 service members were still expelled from the military if they engaged in sexual conduct with a member of the same sex, stated that they were lesbian, gay, or bisexual, and/or married or attempted to marry someone of the same sex.

The Coast Guard gained its first female flag officer in 2000 when Vivien Crea was promoted to rear admiral.

Women in the Coast Guard served in the Iraq War from 2003 until 2011.

In 2006 Vivien Crea became the first female Vice Commandant of the United States Coast Guard and the Coast Guard’s first female vice admiral. In 2008 she became the first woman to be recognized as the USCG Ancient Albatross.

In 2011 Rear Admiral Sandra Stosz was chosen by the Commandant of the United States Coast Guard, Admiral Robert J. Papp to become the superintendent of the Coast Guard Academy. She took the job in 2011 and held it until 2015. As such, she was the first woman to lead a United States military service academy.

In 2020, Rear Admiral Melissa Bert became the first woman to serve as the Judge Advocate General and Chief Counsel of the Coast Guard.

In 2021, Linda L. Fagan became the Vice Commandant of the Coast Guard and the Coast Guard’s first female four-star admiral. On May 11, 2022, the U.S. Senate confirmed Linda L. Fagan as the 27th (and first female) Commandant of the Coast Guard. When she assumed command on June 1, she became the first female service chief in the U.S. Armed Forces. However, she was relieved of command on January 21, 2025 by Acting Homeland Security Secretary Benjamine Huffman for "failure to address border security threats, insufficient leadership in recruitment and retention, mismanagement in acquiring key acquisitions such as icebreakers and helicopters, excessive focus on diversity, equity and inclusion initiatives and an "erosion of trust" over the mishandling and cover-up of Operation Fouled Anchor." Admiral Fagan was the first Commandant of the Coast Guard to be relieved before the normal four year term of office expired.

== See also ==
- United States Coast Guard Women's Reserve
- Women in the military
