= Office of the Secretary of Homeland Security =

United States government agency management and oversight body

- Seal of the United States Department of Homeland Security

Agency overview
- Formed: November 25, 2002
- Jurisdiction: General management and oversight of the Department of Homeland Security components
- Headquarters: St. Elizabeths West Campus, Washington, D.C., U.S.
- Parent agency: Department of Homeland Security
- Website: www.dhs.gov/office-secretary

The Office of the Secretary of Homeland Security is a headquarters-level staff of the United States Department of Homeland Security. The Office of the Secretary commands the various departments and agencies of the Department of Homeland Security.

== Composition ==
=== Senior leadership ===
- Secretary of Homeland Security and Deputy Secretary of Homeland Security
  - Senior officials reporting directly to Secretary and Deputy
    - Executive Secretary of the Homeland Security
    - Military Advisor to the Secretary of Homeland Security
    - General Counsel of the Department of Homeland Security
  - Commandant of the Coast Guard
    - Vice Commandant of the Coast Guard
  - Under Secretary of Homeland Security for Management
    - Deputy Under Secretary of Homeland Security for Management
      - Chief of Staff
      - Chief Financial Officer
      - Chief Security Officer
      - Chief Human Capital Officer
      - Chief Information Officer
      - Chief Procurement Officer
      - Chief Readiness Support Officer
      - Director of the Office of Biometric Identity Management
      - Director of the Federal Protective Service
  - Under Secretary of Homeland Security for Science and Technology
    - Deputy Under Secretary of Homeland Security for Science and Technology
      - Chief of Staff
  - Under Secretary of Homeland Security for Intelligence and Analysis
    - Principal Deputy Under Secretary of Homeland Security for the Office of Intelligence and Analysis
  - Under Secretary of Homeland Security for Strategy, Policy, and Plans
    - Deputy Under Secretary of Homeland Security for the Office of Strategy, Policy, and Plans
      - Chief of Staff
      - Assistant Secretary for Border and Immigration
      - Assistant Secretary for Counterterrorism and Homeland Threats
      - Assistant Secretary for Cyber, Infrastructure, Risk and Resilience
      - Assistant Secretary for International Affairs
      - Assistant Secretary for Trade and Economic Security
  - Director of the Cybersecurity and Infrastructure Security Agency
    - Deputy Director of the Cybersecurity and Infrastructure Security Agency
  - Administrator of the Federal Emergency Management Agency
    - Deputy Administrator of the Federal Emergency Management Agency
    - Deputy Administrator of the Federal Emergency Management Agency for Resilience
    - U.S. Fire Administrator
  - Director of U.S. Citizenship and Immigration Services
    - Deputy Director of U.S. Citizenship and Immigration Services
    - Chief of Staff of U.S. Citizenship and Immigration Services
  - Commissioner of U.S. Customs and Border Protection
    - Deputy Commissioner of U.S. Customs and Border Protection
    - Chief Operating Officer
  - Director of the Federal Law Enforcement Training Centers
    - Deputy Director of the Federal Law Enforcement Training Centers
  - Director of U.S. Immigration and Customs Enforcement
    - Deputy Director of U.S. Immigration and Customs Enforcement

=== Components of the Office of the Secretary of Homeland Security ===
| Component | Mission | Executives | Subordinate Components |
|---|---|---|---|
| Office for Civil Rights and Civil Liberties (CRCL) | Supports the Department's mission to secure the nation while preserving individual liberty, fairness, and equality under the law.; Builds in civil rights and civil liberties practices into all of the Department’s activities. | Officer for Civil Rights and Civil Liberties: Shoba Sivaprasad Wadhia; Deputy Officer for Programs & Compliance: Peter Mina; Deputy Officer for EEO and Diversity: Veronica Venture | Programs and Compliance Division; Equal Employment Opportunity and Diversity Division; Office for Accessible Systems and Technology (jointly run with DHS Office of the Chief Information Officer) |
| Office of the Citizenship and Immigration Services Ombudsman (CISOMB) | Serves as a liaison between the public and U.S. Citizenship and Immigration Services.; Helps individuals and employers resolve issues they are having with USCIS.; Holds engagements to hear from the public about their experiences with USCIS.; Identifies issues in the immigration system and make recommendations to USCIS on how to address these problems. | CIS Ombudsman: Nathan Stiefel (acting); Deputy Ombudsman: Nathan Stiefel | Policy Division; Public Engagement Division; Casework Division; Operations Division; Strategy Division |
| Climate Change Action Group | Drives urgent action to address the climate crisis.; Analyzes, on an ongoing basis, the impacts of climate change on DHS missions, assets, and personnel.; Adapts DHS operations, assets, and missions to account for the climate crisis via risk- based strategies.; Coordinates DHS-wide sustainability operations to mitigate additional harm.; Recommends specific, concrete steps to reduce greenhouse gas emissions.; Recommends specific, concrete steps to promote resilience and adaptation to reduce the multiple risks posed by the climate crisis.; Recommends organizational and resource realignments as necessary to support the Department’s activities to address the climate crisis. | Co-Chairs: Cass Sunstein & Robert P. Silvers | |
| Office of the Executive Secretary (ESEC) | Provides all manner of direct support to the Secretary of Homeland Security and Deputy Secretary of Homeland Security, as well as related support to leadership and management across the DHS.; Accurate and timely dissemination of information and written communications. | Executive Secretary: Kimberly O'Connor | |
| Office of the Immigration Detention Ombudsman (OIDO) | Assists individuals with complaints about the potential violation of immigration detention standards or other misconduct by DHS (or contract) personnel.; Provides oversight of immigration detention facilities. | ID Ombudsman: David Gersten (acting); ID Deputy Ombudsman: N/A | Case Management Division; Detention Oversight Division; Policy and Standards Division; External Relations Division; Operations and Resource Management Division; Program Integration Division |
| Family Reunification Task Force | Committed to the safe reunification of families that were unjustly separated at the U.S.-Mexico border. | Chair: Alejandro Mayorkas; Executive Director: Michelle Brané | Includes the secretaries of Homeland Security, Health and Human Services, and State, as well as the Attorney General. It also includes several other officials from the DHS, DOJ, HHS, and State Department. |
| Office of the General Counsel (OGC) | Provides complete, accurate, and timely legal advice on possible courses of action for the DHS.; Ensures that homeland security policies are implemented lawfully, quickly, and efficiently.; Protects the rights and liberties of any Americans who come in contact with the Department of Homeland Security.; Facilitates quick responses to congressional requests for information.; Represents the department in venues across the country, including in U.S. immigration courts.; The OGC accomplishes these tasks with over 3,000 attorneys. | General Counsel: Jonathan Meyer; Deputy General Counsel: Joseph B. Maher; CBP Chief Counsel: Frederick B. Smith; CISA Chief Counsel: Spencer Fisher; USCIS Chief Counsel: A. Ashley Tabaddor; USCG Judge Advocate General: Melissa Bert; FEMA Chief Counsel: Adrian Sevier; FLETC Chief Counsel: Trisha Besselman (acting); ICE Principal Legal Advisor: Kerry Doyle; USSS Chief Counsel: Thomas F. Huse; TSA Chief Counsel: Francine Kerner | Ethics & Compliance Law Division; General Law Division; Immigration Law Division; Intelligence Law Division; Legal Counsel Division; Operations and Enforcement Law Division; Regulatory Affairs Law Division; Technology Programs Law Division |
| Joint Requirements Council (JRC) | Validates capability gaps.; Associated with operational requirements and proposed solution approaches to mitigate those gaps through the Joint Requirements Integration and Management System (JRIMS).; Leverages opportunities for commonality to enhance operational effectiveness directly and better inform the DHS’ main investment pillars. | Executive Director: Joseph D. Wawro | The JRC consists of the Principals Council – the operational Components (Cybersecurity and Infrastructure Security Agency, U.S. Customs and Border Protection, Federal Emergency Management Agency, U.S. Immigration and Customs Enforcement, U.S. Secret Service, Transportation Security Administration, U.S. Coast Guard, and U.S. Citizenship and Immigration Services), I&A, Management, CIO, Policy, and S&T. |
| Office of Legislative Affairs (OLA) | Serves as primary liaison to members of Congress and their staffs, the White House and Executive Branch, and to other federal agencies and governmental entities that have roles in assuring national security | Assistant Secretary for Legislative Affairs: Zephranie Buetow; Deputy Assistant Secretary (Senate): Bryn McDonough; Deputy Assistant Secretary (House of Representatives): Alexandra Carnes | Each area of responsibility is managed by a director. There's a DAS for the U.S. Senate, a DAS for the U.S. House of Representatives, and a Chief of Staff.: Headquarters; Operational Component Coordination; Intelligence, Cyber, and Operations; Oversight and Investigations; Executive Secretary and Mission Support |
| Office of the Military Advisor | Provides counsel and support to the Secretary and Deputy Secretary in affairs relating to policy, procedures, preparedness activities, and operations between DHS and the U.S. Department of Defense. | Military Advisor to the Secretary: Rear Admiral Michael Platt | |
| Office of Partnership and Engagement (OPE) | Coordinates the Department of Homeland Security’s outreach efforts with key stakeholders nationwide.; Ensures a unified approach to external engagement amongst the DHS. | Assistant Secretary for Partnership and Engagement: Brenda F. Abdelall; Principal Deputy Assistant Secretary: Rebecca Sternhell; Deputy Assistant Secretary, Office of Intergovernmental Affairs: › miriam-enriquez-26176910b Miriam Enriquez; Deputy Assistant Secretary, Private Sector Office: Jamie Lawrence | Office of Intergovernmental Affairs; State and Local Affairs; Tribal Government Affairs; Private Sector Office; Office of Academic Engagement; Faith-Based Security Advisory Council; Committee Management Office; Homeland Security Advisory Council; Office of Social Impact and Campaigns; Director, Non-Governmental Organizations |
| Privacy Office | Protects individuals by embedding and enforcing privacy protections and transparency in all DHS activities. | Chief Privacy Officer: Mason C. Clutter (concurrently serves as the DHS Chief Freedom of Information Officer) | Senior Policy Advisor and Executive Director, Strategy and Integration; Deputy Chief FOIA Officer; Senior Director, FOIA Operations and Management; Director of Disclosure; Senior Director, Litigation, Appeals, and Policy; Director, Policy, Oversight, Compliance; Deputy Chief Privacy Officer; Senior Director, Privacy Compliance; Director, Privacy Compliance; Senior Director, Privacy Policy and Oversight; Director, Privacy Policy; Director, Privacy Incidents; Director, Privacy Oversight; Chief of Staff; Director, Business Operations; Director, Communications & Training |
| Office of Public Affairs (OPA) | Coordinates the public affairs activities of all of the components and offices of the DHS.; Serves as the federal government’s lead public information office during a national emergency or disaster. | Assistant Secretary for Public Affairs: Daniel Watson; Principal Deputy Assistant Secretary for Communications: Luis Miranda; Deputy Assistant Secretary for Media Relations: Sarah Schakow; Deputy Assistant Secretary for Strategic Communications: Jeff Solnet | DHS Press Office; Incident and Strategic Communications; Multimedia; Speechwriting; Web Communications; Internal Communications |
| Office of Strategy, Policy, and Plans (OSP&P) | Serves as a central resource to the Secretary and other department leaders for strategic planning and analysis, and facilitation of decision-making on the full breadth of issues that may arise across the dynamic homeland security enterprise | Under Secretary for Strategy, Policy, and Plans: Robert Silvers; Deputy Under Secretary: Kelli Ann Burriesci | Chief of Staff; Assistant Secretary for Border and Immigration Policy; Deputy Assistant Secretary, Border and Immigration; Deputy Assistant Secretary, Immigration Statistics; Assistant Secretary for Counterterrorism and Threat Prevention; Principal Deputy Assistant Secretary, Counterterrorism and Threat Prevention; Deputy Assistant Secretary, Screening and Vetting; Deputy Assistant Secretary, Law Enforcement; Deputy Assistant Secretary, Countering Transnational Organized Crime; Deputy Assistant Secretary, Counterterrorism and Threat Prevention; Assistant Secretary for International Affairs; Principal Deputy Assistant Secretary, International Affairs; Deputy Assistant Secretary, Western Hemisphere; Assistant Secretary for Trade and Economic Security; Deputy Assistant Secretary, Trade Policy; Deputy Assistant Secretary, Economic Security; Assistant Secretary for Cyber, Infrastructure, Risk, and Resilience; Deputy Assistant Secretary, Cyber Policy; Deputy Assistant Secretary, Infrastructure, Risk, and Resilience; Deputy Assistant Secretary for Strategic Integration and Policy Planning |
| Office for State and Local Law Enforcement (OSLLE) | Provides DHS with primary coordination, liaison, and advocacy for state, local, tribal, territorial, and campus (SLTTC) law enforcement. | Assistant Secretary for State and Local Law Enforcement: Heather Fong; Deputy Assistant Secretary: N/A | |

== See also ==
- Awards and decorations of the United States Department of Homeland Security
- Awards and decorations of the United States Coast Guard
