= Maritime Awareness Global Network =

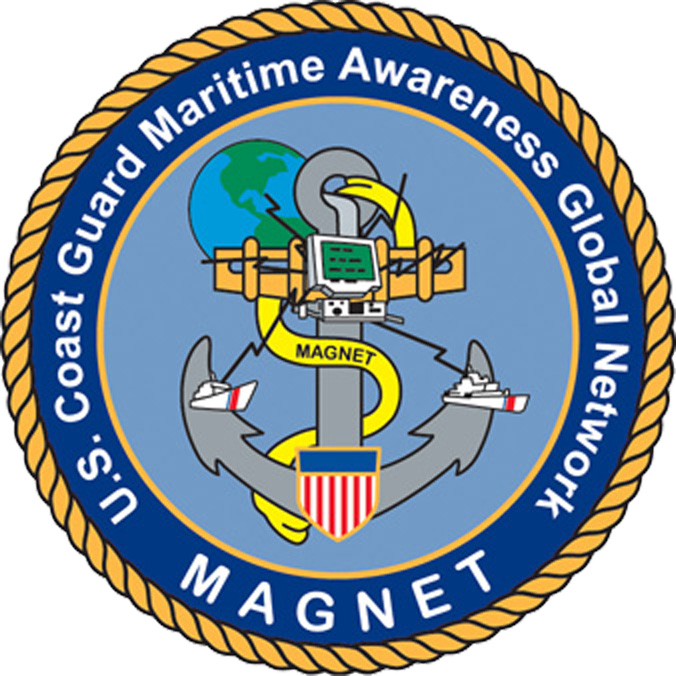
Maritime Awareness Global Network program logo

Maritime Awareness Global Network (MAGNET) is an intelligence tool for the collection, correlation, fusion, and dissemination of maritime information via web-enabled user interfaces to specific user groups in support of maritime domain awareness (MDA).

The United States Coast Guard, an agency of the Department of Homeland Security, developed the Maritime Awareness Global Network (MAGNET) system to use information relating to vessels and activities within the maritime environment to accomplish the Coast Guard's missions in the areas of Maritime Safety, Maritime Security, Maritime Mobility, National Defense, and Protection of Natural Resources. MAGNET replaces the Joint Maritime Information Element (JMIE) Support System (JSS).

MAGNET provides awareness to the field as well as to strategic planners by aggregating data from existing sources internal and external to the Coast Guard or the Department of Homeland Security. MAGNET correlates data and provides the medium to display information such as ship registry, current ship position, crew background, passenger lists, port history, cargo, known criminal vessels, and suspect lists. MAGNET processes personally identifiable information (PII).

Coast Guard Intelligence serves as MAGNET's executive agent and shares appropriate aggregated data on a need to know basis with other law enforcement and intelligence agencies.

MAGNET provides access to the database via workstations located throughout the world. The system will be accessible on multiple networks at different classification levels. The workstations are equipped to access the appropriate networks with current browser technology.

== See also ==
- U.S. Coast Guard Legal Division
- U.S. Coast Guard Investigative Service
- Coast Guard Intelligence
