= Lane I. McClelland =

Retired United States Coast Guard captain

- Born: 1949 (age 76–77); New Jersey
- Military career
- Branch: United States Coast Guard
- Service years: 1974–2002
- Awards: Defense Meritorious Service Medal; Meritorious Service Medal; Coast Guard Commendation Medal (3); Coast Guard Achievement Medal

Lane I. McClelland (born 1949) is a retired United States Coast Guard captain and military lawyer who serves as the Chief Judge of the Coast Guard Court of Criminal Appeals. Judge McClelland is the first woman to serve as Chief Trial Judge of the Coast Guard and the first woman to serve as Chief Judge of the Coast Guard Court of Criminal Appeals.

== Early life and education ==
McClelland was born in Passaic, New Jersey, in 1949 and raised in Vestal, New York, where most of her extracurricular activities were in music. She attended Cornell University and became a chimesmaster, proficient at playing the 18-bell chime in the library tower, a well-known feature of the campus. She graduated from Cornell University in 1970 with a degree in mechanical engineering. She went on to receive MBA and law degrees in 1973 and 1974 from Cornell.

== Career ==
=== U.S. Coast Guard ===
McClelland joined the United States Coast Guard via Officer Candidate School in the fourth OCS class to include women, and was commissioned as an ensign in December 1974. Six months later, she was commissioned as a lieutenant through the Direct Commission Law Specialist Program. She began her service as a legal officer with tours as a staff attorney at a district legal office and as a base legal officer, with duties including trial counsel and defense counsel before courts-martial, as well as legal assistance to Coast Guard members and families, claims, government contracts, personnel law, and other legal support to the Coast Guard. McClelland later served at Coast Guard Headquarters in the Maritime and International Law Division, and as District Legal Officer (Staff Judge Advocate) of the Second Coast Guard District in St. Louis.

She also served outside of the legal specialty at Marine Safety Offices in San Francisco and Baltimore, performing vessel inspection, investigation, licensing, port safety and pollution response duties, including a year as executive officer in Baltimore. In 1990, she became the first Women's Policy Advisor in the Office of Personnel and Training at Coast Guard Headquarters. In 1992, she became the first active duty woman since SPARS to be promoted to the rank of captain. In 1993, she became the first woman assigned as Chief Trial Judge of the Coast Guard. She served as Chief of the Coast Guard Office of Claims and Litigation from June 1997 to December 2000, while serving part-time as a judge on the Coast Guard Court of Criminal Appeals from 1 July 1997 to 18 January 2001. After acting as the Deputy Chief Counsel of the Coast Guard beginning in December 2000, McClelland retired from active duty in March 2002.

=== Chief Judge of the Coast Guard Court of Criminal Appeals ===
Upon retiring from active duty in the United States Coast Guard, McClelland became a civilian employee of the Coast Guard Hearing Office, serving as a Hearing Officer adjudicating civil penalties for violations of Coast Guard administered laws. She began serving for a second time as a judge on the Coast Guard Court of Criminal Appeals in 2003, this time as a civilian, and has been designated as the Chief Judge of the Coast Guard Court of Criminal Appeals since 2007.

=== Awards ===
McClelland's awards include the Legion of Merit, Meritorious Service Medal, Coast Guard Commendation Medal (3 awards), Coast Guard Achievement Medal, and the Expert Pistol Shot Medal.

== See also ==
- Women in the United States Coast Guard
