= Courts-martial of the United States =

Trials conducted by the U.S. military

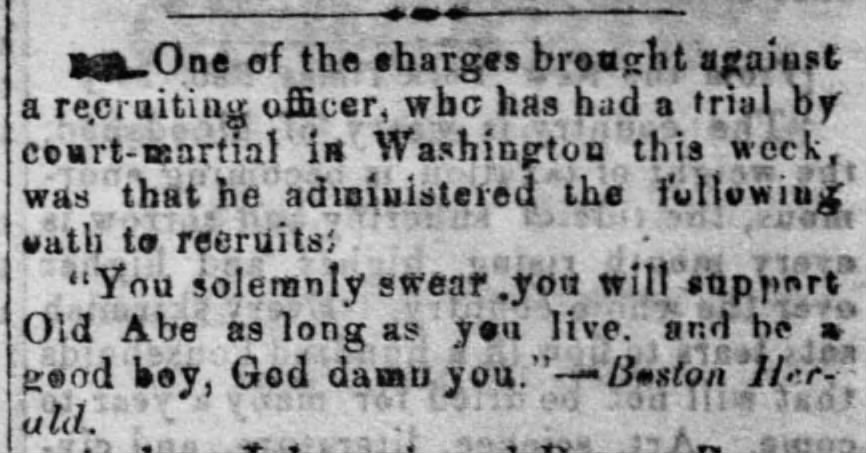
The Spirit of Democracy, Woodsfield, Ohio, March 8, 1865

Courts-martial of the United States are trials conducted by the U.S. military or by state militaries. Most commonly, courts-martial are convened to try members of the U.S. military for violations of the Uniform Code of Military Justice (UCMJ). They can also be convened for other purposes, including military tribunals and the enforcement of martial law in an occupied territory. Federal courts-martial are governed by the rules of procedure and evidence laid out in the Manual for Courts-Martial, which contains the Rules for Courts-Martial (RCM), Military Rules of Evidence, and other guidance. State courts-martial are governed according to the laws of the state concerned. The American Bar Association has issued a Model State Code of Military Justice, which has influenced the relevant laws and procedures in some states.

Courts-martial are adversarial proceedings, as are all United States criminal courts. That is, lawyers representing the government and the accused present the facts, legal aspects, and arguments most favorable to each side; a military judge determines questions of law, and the members of the panel (the military equivalent of a jury) (or military judge in a judge-alone case) determine questions of fact.

State National Guards (air and army), can convene summary and special courts martial for state-level, peacetime military offenses committed by non-federalized Guard Airmen and Soldiers, in the same manner as federal courts martial proceed. The authority for State National Guards to convene courts martial is under Title 32 of the US Code. States that have militaries (State Guards) outside the federally regulated National Guard convene courts-martial by authority of state laws.

== Historical development ==
From the earliest beginnings of the United States, military commanders have played a central role in the administration of military justice. The American military justice system, derived from its British predecessor, predates the Articles of Confederation and the Constitution. While military justice in the United States has evolved considerably over the years, the convening authority has remained the instrument of selecting a panel for courts-martial.

Tribunals for the trial of military offenders have coexisted with the early history of armies. The modern court-martial is deeply rooted in systems that predated written military codes and were designed to bring order and discipline to armed, and sometimes barbarous, fighting forces. Both the ancient Greeks and the Romans had military justice codes, although no written versions of them survive. Moreover, nearly every form of military tribunal included a trial before a panel or members of some type.

The concept of the American military court-martial was derived from the Court of Chivalry in England and the military code of Sweden's King Gustavus Adolphus. These courts both strove to strike a balance between the demands of good order and discipline and the concept of due process. This, in turn, laid a foundation for modern systems of military justice that strive to do the same. The Court of Chivalry had a direct impact on the British Articles of War. The early British Articles of War reflected a concern for due process and panel member composition.

When war broke out between the American Colonists and the British in 1775, the British were operating under the 1765 edition of the Articles of War. This version would serve as the template for military justice in the Continental Army. When the United States declared independence and fought the Revolutionary War, "it had a ready-made military justice system." Despite the Colonists' dissatisfaction with the British, they still recognized the intrinsic value of the British military justice system in providing good order and discipline to its own armed forces.

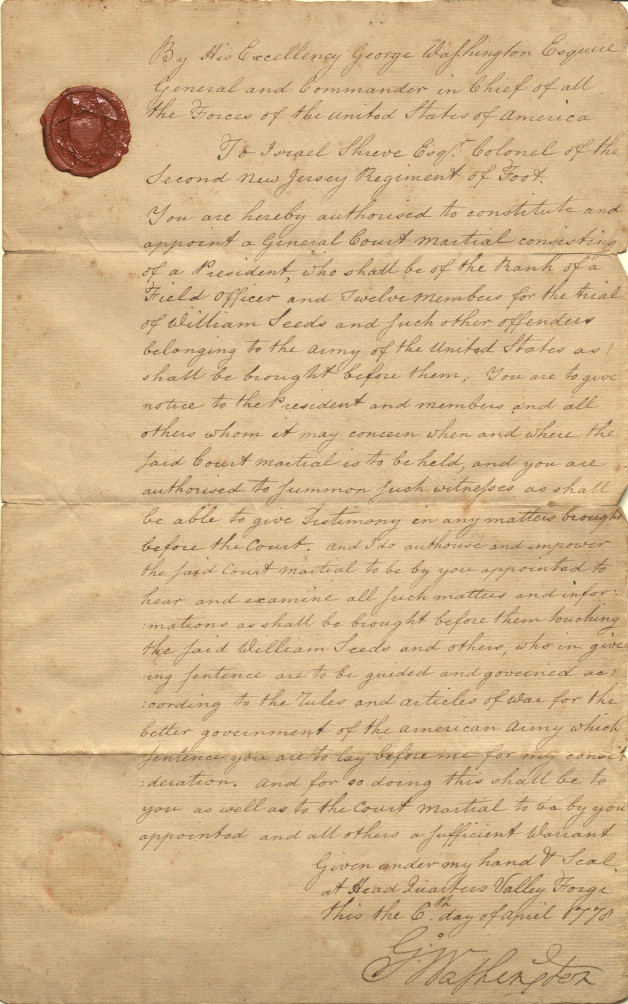
Court Martial of William Seeds, 1778

The 1765 British Articles of War were the template for the American military justice system. Accordingly, a general court-martial panel consisted of thirteen commissioned officers selected by a convening authority, with a field grade officer as president. A regimental court-martial consisted of five commissioned officers selected by the regimental commander; however, unlike the British equivalent, the regimental commander could not sit as president. Further, the Continental Congress broke away from the British system in an even more significant way: the American Articles of War were created by a legislative enactment and not by an executive order. Thus, in the American system, the legislature undertook the government of the armed forces from the beginning—military justice was not going to be left to the executive. Second, Congress demonstrated its flexibility and willingness to change the Articles as necessary. The top military lawyer, Colonel William Tudor, informed Congress that the Articles were in need of revision. Congress would go on to revise the Articles several times to reflect the realities of a small military force. Nonetheless, the commander retained his role in the administration of justice.

Until 1916, a service-member accused in a general court-martial did not have a right to a defense counsel. The service member could, however, request a defense counsel or pay for one. A judge advocate, prior to 1916 had a three-fold duty. To prosecute the case, to ensure that the accused soldier's or sailor's rights were protected – including making sure that witnesses favorable to the accused were present – and to advise the court-martial on the law. Until 1969, there was no military trial judge ensuring that an accused's due process rights were protected. According to University of New Mexico School of Law Professor Joshua E. Kastenberg, there were aspects of a court-martial that exceeded state criminal courts in due process protections, but, there were widespread due process deficits which caused Congress to reevaluate courts-martial in 1920 and 1945-50 respectively.

=== 81st Congress sets out to create the UCMJ ===
After World War II, concerns from veterans’ organizations and bar associations regarding the military justice system in general, and, in particular, the problem of unlawful command influence of courts-martial, led to substantive Congressional reform. The 81st Congress (1949–51) set out to create a unified system of military justice for all the Federal military services, and appointed a committee chaired by Harvard Law Professor Edmund Morgan to study military justice and draft appropriate legislation. According to Professor Morgan, the task was to draft legislation that would ensure full protection of the rights of individuals without unduly interfering with either military discipline or the exercise of military functions. This would mean a "complete repudiation of a system of military justice conceived of only as an instrument of command," but would also negate "a system designed to be administered as the criminal law is administered in a civilian criminal court." The result was the Uniform Code of Military Justice (UCMJ)—a code that afforded a measure of due process to service members, while retaining command control over the appointment of court-martial members.

=== Subsequent measures in Congress on UCMJ ===
The next time Congress had formal hearings on the UCMJ was when it passed the Military Justice Act of 1983. In 1999, the Secretary of Defense was required by Congress to study the issue of command selection of panel members. Congress did not take action when the Joint Services Committee (JSC) concluded that the "current system is most likely to obtain the best members within the operational constraints of the military justice system."

In 2001, the commission on the 50th Anniversary of the Uniform Code of Military Justice disagreed with the 1999 JSC Report, noting "there is no aspect of military criminal procedure that diverges further from civilian practice, or creates a greater impression of improper influence than the antiquated process of panel selection."

== Constitutional foundation for federal courts-martial ==
The Framers of the Constitution were cognizant of the power struggle between Parliament and the King regarding the powers of the military. Many of the Framers were combat veterans from the Continental Army and understood the demands of military life and the need for a well-disciplined fighting force. The solution to the government of the armed forces was a classic balancing of constitutional interests and powers. They assured that Congress—with its responsiveness to the population, its fact-finding ability, and its collective deliberative processes—would provide for the government of the armed forces.

The Framers of the Constitution had a great respect for the value of separation of powers. One of the primary goals of the Constitutional Convention, in remedying the defects of the Articles of Confederation, was to create a government in which separate branches of power served as a check and balance against the other. Principles of separation of powers also applied to the military. The Framers vested power in the executive and legislative branches, but left the judiciary with only a collateral role in governing the armed forces.

By distributing power over the armed forces between the legislative and executive branches, the Framers "avoided much of the political-military power struggle which typified so much of the early history of the British court-martial system." Moreover, the Framers made it clear that while the command of the military lie with the executive, the military would be governed and regulated according to the law handed down by the legislative branch. Therefore, the government of the armed forces would always reflect the will of the people as expressed through their representatives in Congress.

After ratification of the Constitution in 1789, the First Congress undertook legislative action to provide for the government and regulation of the armed forces of the United States. On September 29, 1789, the Congress expressly adopted the Articles of War that were currently in place for the Continental Army. It can thus be said that Congress continued the court-martial as previously established, and "the court-martial is perceived to be in fact older than the Constitution, and therefore older than any court of the United States instituted or authorized by that instrument."

The Framers consciously placed the power to regulate courts-martial and set military law in the legislative branch of the government. The First Congress and the Framers were also cognizant of the age and history of the court-martial with commander involvement, as well as the customs and traditions that pertained to it. In 1969, the Supreme Court, in O’Callahan v. Parker, stripped the military of much of the jurisdiction that Congress had enabled in the UCMJ. However, by 1987, the Supreme Court reversed course and accepted that the military possessed universal jurisdiction over its members.

Until 1950, the federal courts operated on the strict habeas test where often the sole question considered by the court was whether the military possessed personal jurisdiction over the soldier or sailor on trial. That is, the courts did not review whether the military had complied with due process. Beginning in the 1950s, the federal courts gradually accepted appeals based on claims of a denial of due process.

== Types of courts-martial ==
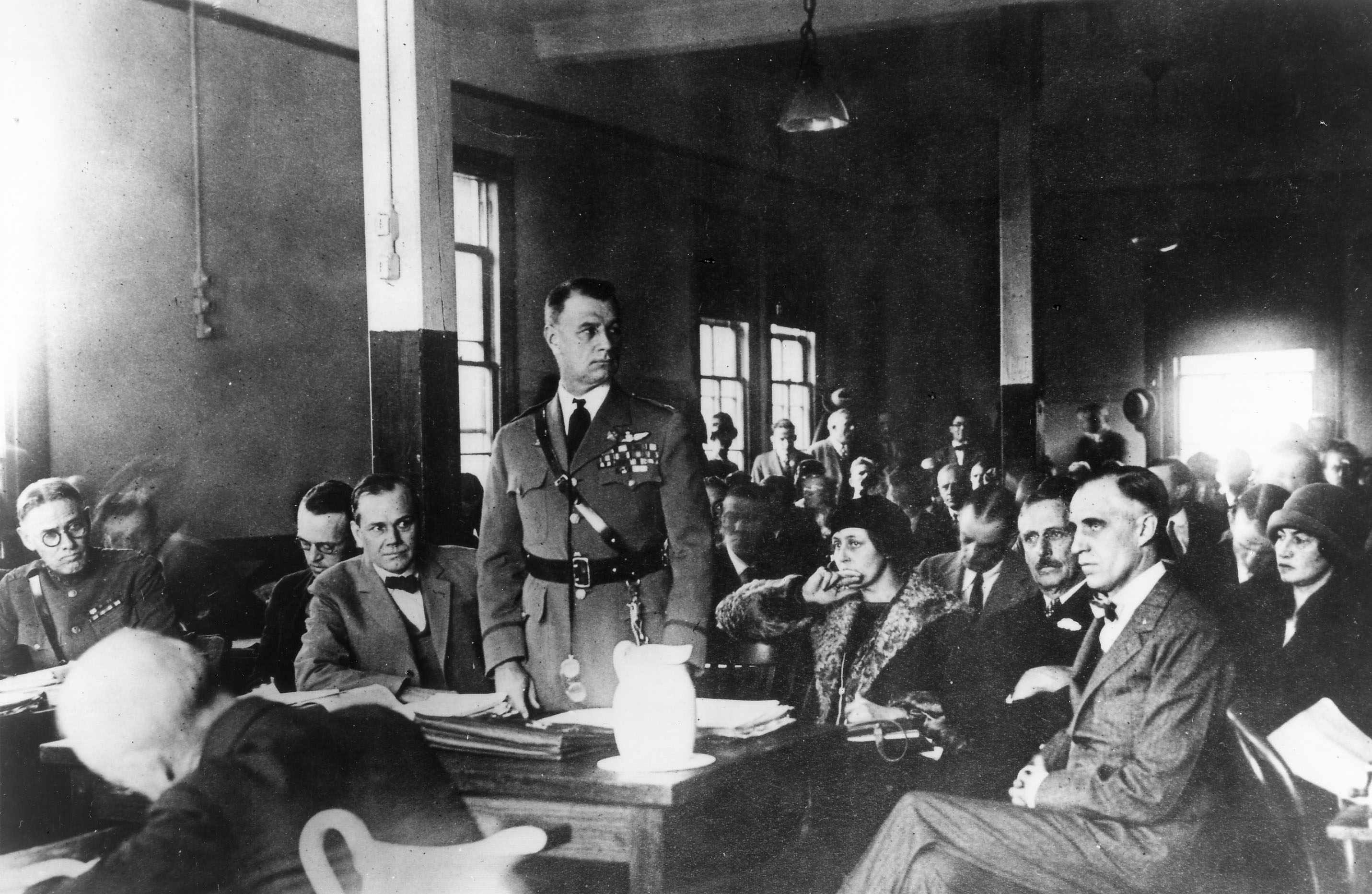
Colonel Billy Mitchell during his court martial in 1925

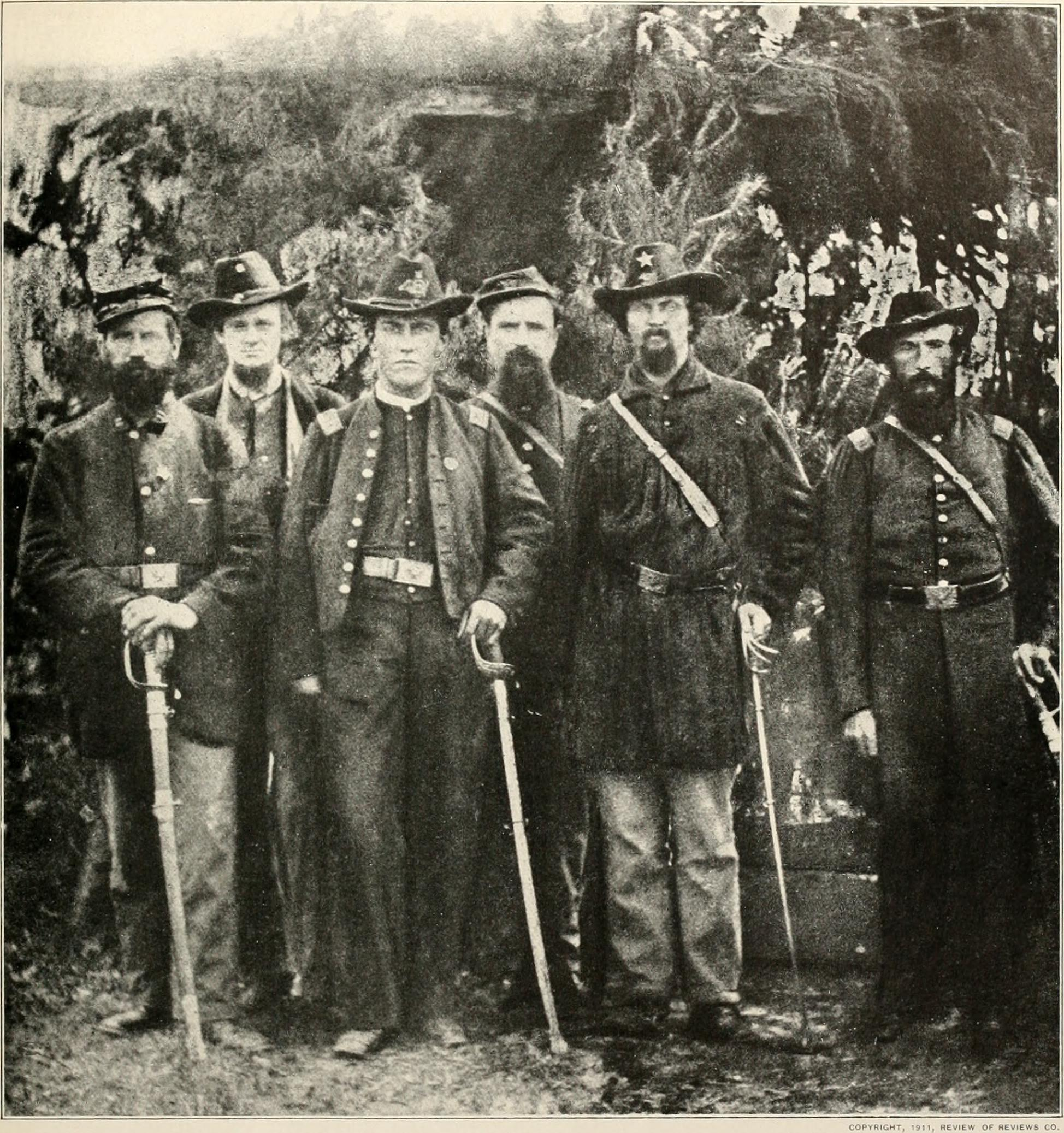
Civil War era Federal court martial after the Battle of Gettysburg

There are three types of federal courts-martial—summary, special, and general. A conviction at a general court-martial is equivalent to a civilian felony conviction in a federal district court or a state criminal trial court. Special courts-martial are considered "federal misdemeanor courts" akin to misdemeanor state courts, because they cannot impose confinement longer than one year. Summary courts-martial have no civilian equivalent, other than perhaps to noncriminal magistrate's proceedings, in that they have been declared by the US Supreme Court to be administrative in nature, because there is no right to counsel; though, as a benefit, the Air Force provides such to Airmen so charged. Enlisted personnel must consent to a trial by summary court-martial and commissioned officers may not be tried in such proceedings. A summary court conviction is legally deemed to be akin to an Article 15 proceeding.

=== Summary court-martial ===
Trial by summary court-martial provides a simple procedure for resolution of charges of relatively minor misconduct committed by enlisted members of the military. Officers may not be tried by summary court-martial. The enlisted accused must consent to be tried by summary court-martial, and if consent is not provided then the command may dispose of the allegation through other means, including directing that the case be tried before a special or general court-martial.

The summary court-martial consists of one individual, who is not a military attorney, but still functions as judge and acts as the sole finder of fact. The maximum punishment at a summary court-martial varies with the accused's paygrade. If the accused is in the pay grade of E-4 or below, they can be sentenced to 30 days of confinement, reduction to pay grade E-1, or restriction for 60 days. Punishments for service members in pay grades E-5 and higher (i.e.., sergeant in the Army or Marine Corps, petty officer 2nd Class in the Navy or Coast Guard) are similar, except that they can only be reduced one pay grade and cannot be confined.

An accused before a summary court-martial is not entitled to receive legal representation from military defense counsel. However, while not required by law, some services, such as the United States Air Force, provide the accused at a trial by summary court-martial free military counsel as a matter of policy. If the government chooses not to provide free military defense counsel to the accused, then that person may retain civilian counsel to represent them, at their own expense.

=== Special court-martial ===
A special court-martial is the intermediate court level. It consists of a military judge, trial counsel (prosecutor), defense counsel, and four officers sitting as a panel of court members. The military judge may detail a military magistrate to preside over the proceedings. An enlisted accused may request a court composed of at least one-third enlisted personnel. A special court-martial may instead consist of a judge alone if requested by the accused or if the convening authority decides so. An accused before a special court-martial is entitled to free legal representation by military defense counsel, and can also retain civilian counsel at his or her expense.

Regardless of the offenses involved, a special court-martial sentence is limited to no more than forfeiture of two-thirds basic pay per month for one year, and additionally for enlisted personnel, one year confinement (or a lesser amount if the offenses have a lower maximum), and/or a bad-conduct discharge; if trial is by military judge alone, this is further reduced to a maximum of confinement for six months and/or forfeiture of pay for more than six months, and no discharge is available.

=== General court-martial ===
A general court-martial is the highest court level. It consists of a military judge, trial counsel (prosecutor), defense counsel, and eight officers sitting as a panel of court-martial members. An enlisted accused may request a court composed of at least one-third enlisted personnel. An accused may also request trial by judge alone.

In a general court-martial, the maximum punishment is that set for each offense under the Manual for Courts-Martial (MCM), and may include death for certain offenses, confinement, a dishonorable or bad conduct discharge for enlisted personnel, a dismissal for officers, or a number of other forms of punishment. A general court-martial is the only forum that may adjudge a sentence to death.

Before a case goes to a general court-martial, a pretrial investigation under Article 32 of the Uniform Code of Military Justice must be conducted, unless waived by the accused; this is the equivalent to a civilian grand jury process. An accused before a general court-martial is entitled to free legal representation by military defense counsel, and can also retain civilian counsel at his or her expense.

== Court-martial process ==
=== Detention before trial ===
Under Article 10 of the UCMJ, "immediate steps" should be taken to bring the accused to trial. Although there is currently no upper time limit on detention before trial, Rule 707 of the Manual for Courts-Martial prescribes a general maximum of 120 days for "speedy trial". Under Article 13, punishment other than arrest or confinement is prohibited before trial, and confinement should be no more rigorous than is required to ensure the accused's presence at trial. In UCMJ parlance, "arrest" refers to a physical restriction to specified geographic limits. "Apprehension", in United States military law, is what would normally be called an arrest in most legal systems.

=== Composition of courts ===
Under Article 25 of the UCMJ, members of the court are selected from members of the armed forces by the convening authority.

Although the Founding Fathers of the United States guaranteed American citizens the right of a jury trial both in the text of the Constitution and in the Bill of Rights, they determined that Congress would establish the rules for disciplining the armed forces. From the beginning, Congress has retained the long-standing practice whereby, contrary to the principle of random jury selection, the convening authority personally selects the members of a court-martial panel. Whether this practice is conducive to fair process has been the subject of critical investigation.

A court-martial has always been an ad hoc tribunal created and appointed by the order of a commanding officer, as the convening authority. The tribunal is established with the express purpose of considering a set of charges that the commander has referred to the court. The convening Authority considers the statutory prescription offered by the United States Congress, those "best qualified," in selecting the "panel" or jury for the court-martial. In turn, the members of the court-martial, who are generally under the command of the convening authority, take an oath to "faithfully and impartially try, according to the evidence, their conscience, and the laws applicable to trial by court-martial, the case of the accused." By their oath, the panel members expressly agree to leave behind any influence from the commander who appointed them. In cases where the accused is an enlisted member, the accused may request that enlisted service members be appointed to the panel.

The appointed or retained defense attorney may challenge both the military judge and members of the panel for cause. However, the military judge determines the relevance and validity of any challenge. The prosecution and defense initially possess one peremptory challenge to members of the court-martial. The accused may also challenge a member of the panel for cause "at any other time during trial when it becomes apparent that a ground for challenge exists." The UCMJ prohibits a convening authority from unlawfully influencing the court. A defense attorney may bring a motion to challenge the validity of the court-martial where it appears that a convening authority has unlawfully influenced court-martial members.

=== Burden of proof ===
At a trial by court-martial (as with a civilian criminal trial), the defendant is presumed innocent unless proven guilty beyond a reasonable doubt by the government via lawful and competent evidence. Reasonable doubt as to the guilt of the accused must be resolved in favor of the accused. In other words, an accused service member must be "given the benefit of the doubt;” or, put more simply: there must be no reasonable chance or likelihood–per the evidence and proceedings–of the accused's innocence. If the accused is charged with a capital offense, then a conviction requires a unanimous verdict. Otherwise, for all other offenses, a conviction requires a three-fourths majority of the court-martial members to vote "guilty." If an accused service member elects to be tried by a military judge sitting alone, rather than by a panel of court-martial members, then the military judge will determine guilt. Unlike in the civilian system, there are no "hung juries;" failure to reach the voting threshold for a conviction results in a verdict of "not guilty," barring the federal government from retrying the defendant by court-martial or in federal court for the same offense arising from the same incident. However, a "not guilty" verdict does not prevent a state government from trying the defendant in a civilian state court on the same offense.

Sentencing in a trial by court-martial is carried out by the military judge on non-capital counts and by the panel on capital counts. In other words, if an accused service member elects to have court-martial members determine his or her guilt, those same court-martial members will adjudge a sentence upon conviction. If an accused service member elects to be tried by military judge sitting alone, then that military judge will sentence the accused if a conviction results from the trial. A sentence to death requires trial by court-martial members; and all members must concur in that sentence. All other sentences may be adjudged in a trial by military judge sitting alone, or if the accused elects to be tried by members, then by the concurrence of three-fourths of the court-martial members. Military judge-alone sentencing in general and special courts-martial will be mandatory for offenses for which the death penalty has not been sought by the government after December 27, 2023, per the 2022 NDAA. The National Defense Authorization Act for Fiscal Year 2022 provides that only military judges will sentence defendants in non-capital cases (and for non-capital offenses in a capital case) after December 27, 2023; defendants may no longer elect member sentencing for non-capital charges after December 27. Member sentencing will continue to be used for capital sentencing.

== Appeals ==
There are procedures for post-trial review in every case, although the extent of those appellate rights depends upon the punishment imposed by the court and approved by the convening authority. Cases involving a punitive discharge, dismissal, confinement for one year or more, or death will undergo automatic review by the appropriate military Court of Criminal Appeals. Further review is possible to the Court of Appeals for the Armed Forces. In cases where the sentence is not sufficiently severe, there is no right to appellate review.

=== Convening authority review ===
In every case resulting in conviction, the convening authority (usually the same commander who ordered the trial to proceed and selected the members of the court-martial) must review the case and decide whether to approve the findings and sentence. Prior to 24 June 2014, federal law provided that a convening authority's discretion to modify a finding or sentence to the benefit of a convicted servicemember was a matter of command prerogative, and was final. Following 24 June 2014, the convening authority's right to grant a convicted service member relief has been significantly curtailed.

After 24 June 2014, convening authorities may not dismiss or reduce a conviction to one for a lesser offense unless the maximum possible sentence of confinement listed for the offense in the Manual for Courts-Martial is two years or less, and the sentence actually adjudged did not include a dismissal, dishonorable discharge, bad conduct discharge, or confinement for more than six months. Further, the convening authority may not dismiss or reduce a conviction for rape, sexual assault, rape or sexual assault of a child, or forcible sodomy, regardless of the sentence actually adjudged at trial.

Further, after 24 June 2014, convening authorities may not disapprove, commute, or suspend an adjudged sentence, in whole or in part, an adjudged sentence to be dismissed, dishonorably discharged, to receive a bad conduct discharge, or to serve more than six months of confinement. Exceptions to this limitation on the power to reduce those types of punishments exist for when the convicted service member enters into a pretrial agreement to plead guilty in return for having any adjudged dishonorable discharge reduced to a bad conduct discharge, or when the convicted service member provides "substantial assistance" to the investigation or prosecution of another person.

=== Intermediate service courts of criminal appeals ===
After a conviction has been reviewed by the convening authority, if the sentence includes death, dismissal, a dishonorable discharge, a bad conduct discharge, or confinement for a year or more, then the case is reviewed by the appropriate service Court of Criminal Appeals. The four service Courts of Criminal Appeals are:

- Army Court of Criminal Appeals
- Navy-Marine Corps Court of Criminal Appeals
- Air Force Court of Criminal Appeals
- Coast Guard Court of Criminal Appeals

The service courts of criminal appeals have the power to reverse convictions that are either legally or factually insufficient, and to reduce sentences that they deem to be inappropriately severe. The power to determine factual sufficiency is a unique power for an appellate court to possess, and in exercising that authority the courts of criminal appeals may separately weigh the evidence, judge the credibility of witnesses, and determine controverted questions of fact, even though only the trial court saw and heard the witnesses. The accused will be assigned an appellate defense counsel to represent them on appeal free of charge. Civilian counsel may be retained at the accused's own expense.

=== Court of Appeals for the Armed Forces ===
From the service court of criminal appeals, a service member, if sentenced to either death, dismissal, dishonorable discharge, bad conduct discharge, or more than a year confinement, may also petition the United States' highest military court—the Court of Appeals for the Armed Forces (CAAF). This court consists of 5 civilian judges, appointed for a fifteen-year term, and it can correct any legal error it may find. Appellate defense counsel will also be available to assist the accused at no charge. Again, the accused can also be represented by civilian counsel, but at their own expense. Review by the CAAF is discretionary and a limited number of cases are reviewed each year. For the fiscal year beginning on October 1, 2012, and ending on September 30, 2013, CAAF received 964 cumulative filings and disposed of 900 cases. Of these 900 cases, 39 were disposed of by signed or per curiam opinions and 861 were disposed by memorandum or order.

=== Request for pardon ===
As a final measure of appeal, a convicted service member may also petition the President of the United States for a reprieve or pardon under the Constitutional authority granted in Article II, Section 2.

== Courts-martial and appellate courts as legislative (Article I) courts ==
As noted above, the federal courts had been historically reticent to grant appeals in courts-martial. In the 1857 decision, Dynes v. Hoover, the Supreme Court determined that the test for determining whether an Article III court possessed the constitutional authority to review the merits of an appeal from a court-martial rested on the sole question as to whether the court-martial possessed jurisdiction over the person prosecuted in it. As a result, the Army or Navy could deviate from their respective military crimes to the detriment of a service-member. Thus, unless the Army, Navy, or a president determined the court-martial had been conducted in error, there was little relief available to the service-member. Kastenberg has pointed out that the Court issued Dynes almost contemporaneously with Dred Scott v. Sanford, and there is a relationship between the two decision. The Court apparently agreed with the arguments of counsel for the United States, Ransom Hooker Gillet, that the Army's discipline in Kansas was in question because several officers found it appalling that they might have to enforce the Fugitive Slave Act. (Gillet later became a 'copperhead' during the Civil War and accused President Abraham Lincoln of being a tyrant). While one of the purposes for the government's argument in Dynes had been mooted by the Civil War, it remained the law on courts-martial appeals through the 1940.

It is important to place a court-martial appeal to the Federal Court in its context as a legislative (Article I) court. Article III courts do not handle all of the judicial business in the United States. Congress has used its enumerated powers under the Constitution in conjunction with the Necessary and Proper Clause to create specialized tribunals, including courts-martial. Article I, Section 8 of the Constitution says Congress shall have the power "To make Rules for the Government and Regulation of the land and naval forces."

Even where life and liberty are at stake, legislative courts are not required to grant all of the rights that are intrinsic to the Article III courts. The Supreme Court has, instead, only disturbed the statutory due process system of a given legislative court if the question concerns "fundamental rights."

Of all the legislative courts created by Congress, courts-martial have received the most deference from Article III courts. Under a standard of review known as the "separate community" or "military deference" doctrine, the courts have proclaimed the armed forces to be "a specialized society separate from civilian society" with unique needs. The Article III courts will not invalidate the balance reached by Congress as regards the administration of military justice unless the "fundamental right" being affected is "extraordinarily weighty."

Today's court-martial system, including command selection of jurors, the lack of unanimity in verdicts, and the allowance of 3 or 5 member panels, has thus far withstood scrutiny. This is perhaps because an accused in a trial by general or special court-martial enjoys significant statutory due process rights, such as:

1. assistance of counsel;
2. information of the charges brought, including the ability to obtain a bill of particulars;
3. a speedy trial;
4. compulsory process of witnesses and evidence;
5. the privilege against self-incrimination; and
6. appellate review in cases where the sentence received is sufficiently severe.

Given those statutory rights, the balance that Congress has struck in the administration of justice will not be lightly disturbed by an Article III court.

== Access to the U.S. Supreme Court after appeals ==
In certain limited circumstances, service members have their cases heard by the Supreme Court. Since 2005, various bills have been introduced in Congress to give service members an appeal of their cases to the United States Supreme Court. None of these bills has been enacted, and as of 2010 there is legislation pending.

== See also ==
- Nonjudicial punishment
