= Vivien Crea =

US Coast Guard admiral

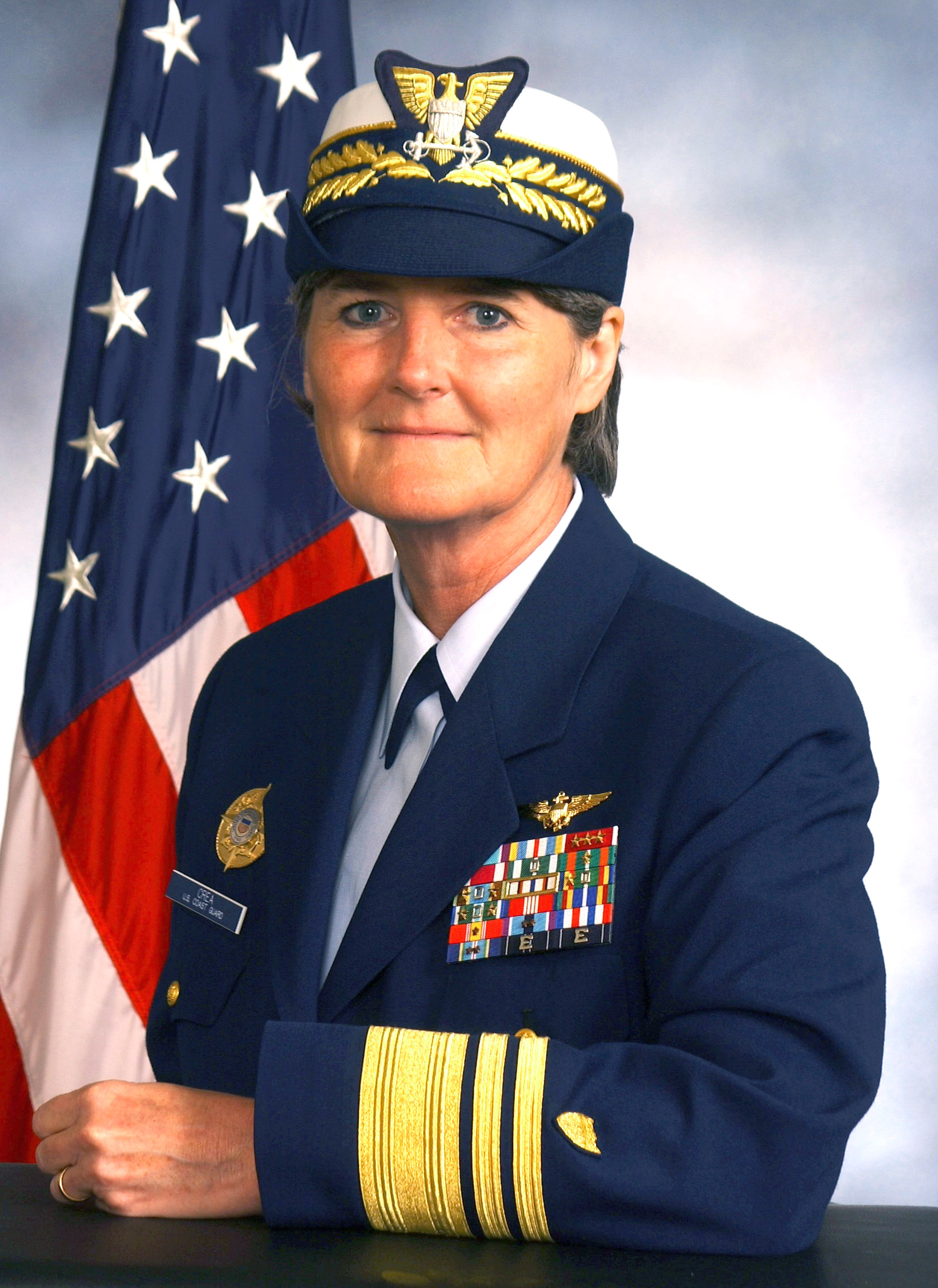
- Born: 1952 (age 73–74); Fort Belvoir, Virginia, U.S.
- Military career
- Allegiance: United States
- Branch: United States Coast Guard
- Service years: 1973–2009
- Rank: Vice admiral
- Commands: Coast Guard Atlantic Area; First Coast Guard District; Coast Guard Air Station Clearwater; Coast Guard Air Station Detroit
- Conflicts: Cold War; Global war on terrorism: September 11 attacks
- Awards: Homeland Security Distinguished Service Medal; Coast Guard Distinguished Service Medal; Defense Superior Service Medal; Legion of Merit (4)

Vivien Suzanne Crea (born 1952) was the 25th Vice Commandant of the United States Coast Guard under Admiral Thad W. Allen. Vice Commandant is the second highest position in the Coast Guard, and she was the first woman to hold it. She is the former Commander of the Coast Guard Atlantic Area, and was confirmed by the Senate to her historic post in June 2006. Crea retired on 7 August 2009, and was replaced by VADM David Pekoske.

She previously became the first female in the U.S. Armed Forces to serve as a military aide to a President in 1984. Crea later became the first woman to command an air station when she took over Air Station Detroit in 1992. In 2000 she became the first woman to attain flag rank in the United States Coast Guard. In 2006 Crea became the first female Vice Commandant of the United States Coast Guard and the Coast Guard's first female vice admiral. She later became the first woman to be recognized as the USCG Ancient Albatross in 2008. In 2010, she became the first Coast Guard aviator to be inducted into the Women in Aviation International Pioneer Hall of Fame.

== Background and education ==
Born to a military family at Fort Belvoir, Virginia, she grew up on military bases including Germany and graduated from Seoul American High School in 1968. She earned a bachelor's degree in biology from the University of Texas at Austin in 1972. Crea earned a master's degree from the Massachusetts Institute of Technology as a Sloan Fellow, as well as one from Central Michigan University.

== Career ==
After seeking to join the National Oceanic and Atmospheric Administration and the Environmental Protection Agency in 1972, Crea was commissioned an Ensign in the Coast Guard Reserve upon graduation from Officer Candidate School (OCS) at Reserve Training Center, Yorktown, Virginia in December 1973.

She was in the first group of women to be admitted to flight school at Pensacola, earning her wings in April 1977. She then spent the next seven years flying C-130 Hercules transports at Air Station Barber's Point (Hawaii), Air Station Elizabeth City (North Carolina) and Air Station Borinquen (Puerto Rico).

As a Lieutenant Commander, she became the first woman from any service, as well as the first service member from the US Coast Guard to serve as the Presidential Military Aide, where she carried the nuclear football for President Ronald Reagan from 1984-1987.

Rear Admiral Crea previously served as Commander, First Coast Guard District in 2002, overseeing all Coast Guard operations in the Northeastern United States, from the Maine-Canada border to Northern New Jersey. Prior to that she served as Director of Information and Technology of the Coast Guard as chief information officer and oversaw the Coast Guard's Research and Development program.

As a Vice Admiral, Crea assumed command of Coast Guard Atlantic Area on 16 July 2004. This post is the operational commander for all Coast Guard activities in an area of responsibility spanning five Coast Guard Districts, over 14,000,000 square miles (36,000,000 km^{2}) covering the Eastern and Midwestern United States from the Rocky Mountains to Maine and Mexico, out across the Atlantic and through the Caribbean Sea, involving over 33,000 military and civilian employees, and 30,000 auxiliarists. She served concurrently as Commander, Coast Guard Defense Force East.

Earlier assignments include Chief, Office of Programs in Coast Guard Headquarters, Commanding Officer of Air Station Clearwater, Executive Assistant to the Commandant of the Coast Guard; Commanding Officer, Air Station Detroit; Operations Officer, Air Station Borinquen, Puerto Rico; Coast Guard Aide to President Reagan; and many other operational assignments. As a Coast Guard aviator, Vice Admiral Crea has flown the C-130 Hercules turboprop, HH-65 Dolphin helicopter, and Gulfstream II jet.

=== Military awards ===

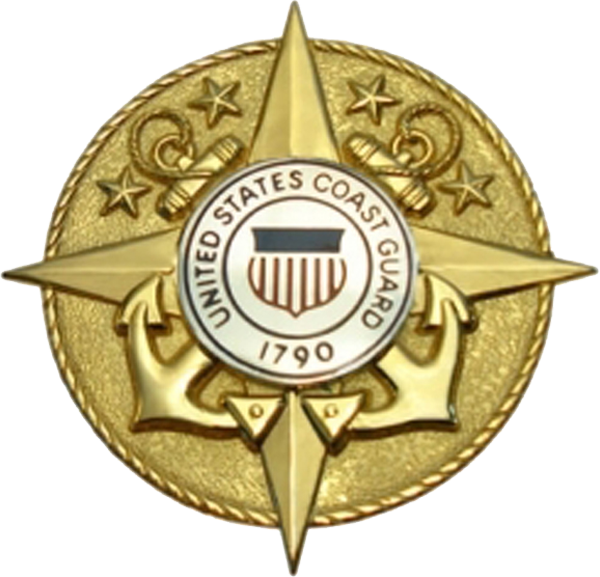

Coast Guard Aviator Badge
Homeland Security Distinguished Service Medal
| Coast Guard Distinguished Service Medal | Defense Superior Service Medal | Legion of Merit w/ 3 award stars |
| Meritorious Service Medal | Coast Guard Commendation Medal w/Operational Distinguishing Device | Coast Guard Achievement Medal w/ 1 award star |
| Commandant's Letter of Commendation Ribbon w/ 3 award stars | Secretary of Transportation Outstanding Unit Award | Coast Guard Unit Commendation w/ 2 award stars |
| Coast Guard Meritorious Unit Commendation w/ 3 award stars | Meritorious Team Commendation | Coast Guard Bicentennial Unit Commendation |
| National Defense Service Medal w/ 2 service stars | Humanitarian Service Medal w/ 2 service stars | Transportation 9-11 Ribbon |
| Special Operations Service Ribbon w/ 2 service stars | Expert Rifle Medal | Expert Pistol Medal |
| Presidential Service Badge | | Commandant Staff Badge |

During Crea's tenure as Vice Commandant, she held the title of Ancient Albatross, the longest serving aviator in the Coast Guard.

== See also ==
- List of female United States military generals and flag officers

== Notes ==
Military offices
| Preceded by Terry M. Cross | Vice Commandant of the United States Coast Guard; 2006—2009 | Succeeded by David Pekoske |
