= Coast Guard Court of Criminal Appeals =

United States Article I court

United States Coast Guard Court of Criminal Appeals
- (C.G.C.C.A.)
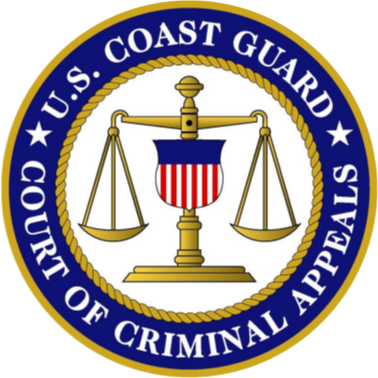
- Location: Washington, D.C.
- Appeals to: Court of Appeals for the Armed Forces
- Established: 1968
- Authority: Article I tribunal
- Created by: Uniform Code of Military Justice
- Official website

The Coast Guard Court of Criminal Appeals (CGCCA) is the intermediate appellate court for criminal convictions in the U.S. Coast Guard. It is located in Washington, DC.

Congress established the Court under Article 66, Uniform Code of Military Justice (UCMJ), 10 United States Code §866. The Court is currently composed of nine appellate military judges, organized in panels of three for consideration of cases. All but the Chief Judge and one other full-time judge have other primary duties, so that their service on the Court constitutes a collateral (part-time) duty.

== Jurisdiction ==
=== Review of courts-martial ===
In general, the Court reviews and acts on the records by affirming, reversing, or modifying in part the findings or sentence in each case of trial by court-martial before it. It has jurisdiction over any court-martial for which there has been a finding of guilty.

After CGCCA review, the next level of appeal is to the United States Court of Appeals for the Armed Forces.

=== Writ review ===
Also reviewed by the Court are petitions for extraordinary writs, petitions for new trial which have been referred to the Court, and appeals by the United States under Article 62, UCMJ.

== Current composition of the court ==
The judges may be commissioned officers or civilians. As of 2024, the court is constituted as follows:

- Chief Judge Lane I. McClelland
- Judge John F. Havranek
- Judge Brian M. Judge
- Judge Kurt J. Brubaker
- Judge Scott C. Herman
- Judge Steven C. Mannion
- Judge Herbert Claiborne Pell
- Judge Brandy Parker

== See also ==
- Court-martial
- Coast Guard Legal Division
- Coast Guard Investigative Service
- Army Court of Criminal Appeals
- Navy-Marine Corps Court of Criminal Appeals
- Air Force Court of Criminal Appeals
- Edmond v. United States
