= William D. Baumgartner =

American Coast Guard admiral

Rear Admiral William D. Baumgartner
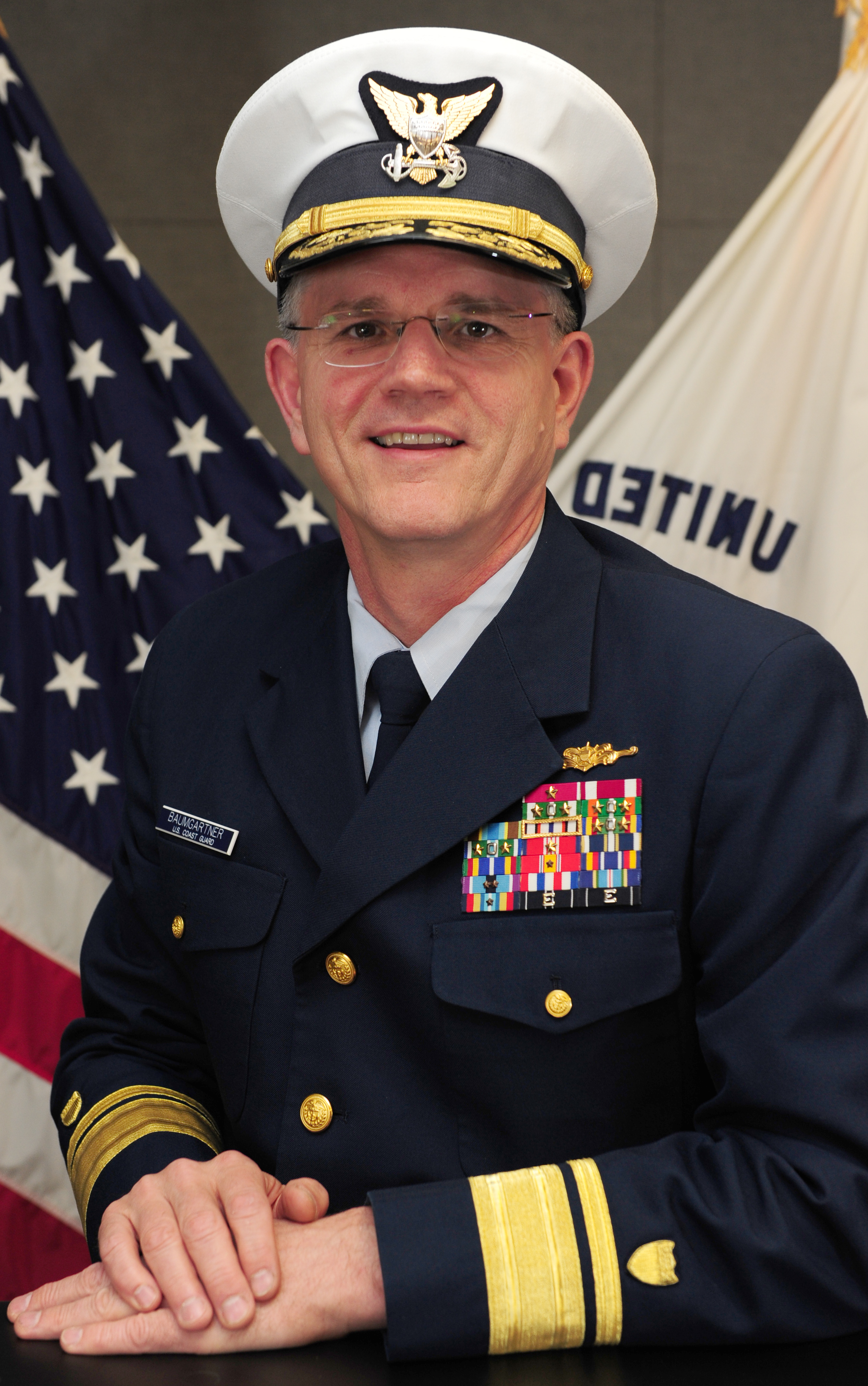
- Born: Collinsville, Illinois, U.S.
- Military career
- Allegiance: United States of America
- Branch: Coast Guard
- Service years: 1976–2013
- Rank: Rear Admiral
- Commands: Seventh Coast Guard District; Judge Advocate General
- Awards: Legion of Merit; Meritorious Service Medal

William Dale Baumgartner was a United States Coast Guard rear admiral who served as the Commander, Seventh Coast Guard District. He was also the Judge Advocate General and Chief Counsel of the United States Coast Guard. In this capacity, he was the Coast Guard's senior legal advisor and is responsible for all aspects of the service's legal program.

A native of Collinsville, Illinois, he is a 1980 graduate of the U.S. Coast Guard Academy where he received Bachelor of Science degrees in Marine Engineering and Electrical Engineering. He holds a Master of Business Administration degree from the University of New Orleans and a Juris Doctor degree, magna cum laude, from Harvard Law School where he also served as an editor on the Harvard Law Review.

Previously, Baumgartner served as Chief, Office of Maritime and International Law, at Coast Guard Headquarters and headed the U.S. delegation to the Legal Committee of the International Maritime Organization. He has also served as the Staff Judge Advocate for the Seventh Coast Guard District in Miami, Florida and as the Chief of Staff for Homeland Security Task Force Southeast, an interagency task force charged with planning for and executing Caribbean mass migration deterrence and response operations. Previous legal assignments also include tours at the Eighth Coast Guard District, in New Orleans, Louisiana, Coast Guard Maintenance & Logistics Command Pacific in Alameda, California, and Naval Legal Services Office West in San Francisco, California.

Prior to joining the Coast Guard's legal program, Baumgartner specialized in surface operations and served as the Commanding Officer of USCGC Point Verde and USCGC Penobscot Bay, as a deck officer on USCGC Dependable, and as an operations center controller for the Eighth Coast Guard District where he directed Search and Rescue, law enforcement and other Coast Guard operations in the Gulf of Mexico.

RADM Baumgartner retired from the Coast Guard on June 26, 2013.

== Personal ==
In the 2024 United States presidential election, Baumgartner endorsed Kamala Harris.

== See also ==
- Organization of the United States Coast Guard
- U.S. Coast Guard Legal Division

Military offices
Preceded by John E. Crowley	Judge Advocate General of the United States Coast Guard; 2006 – 2010	Succeeded by Frederick J. Kenney
