= Frederick J. Kenney =

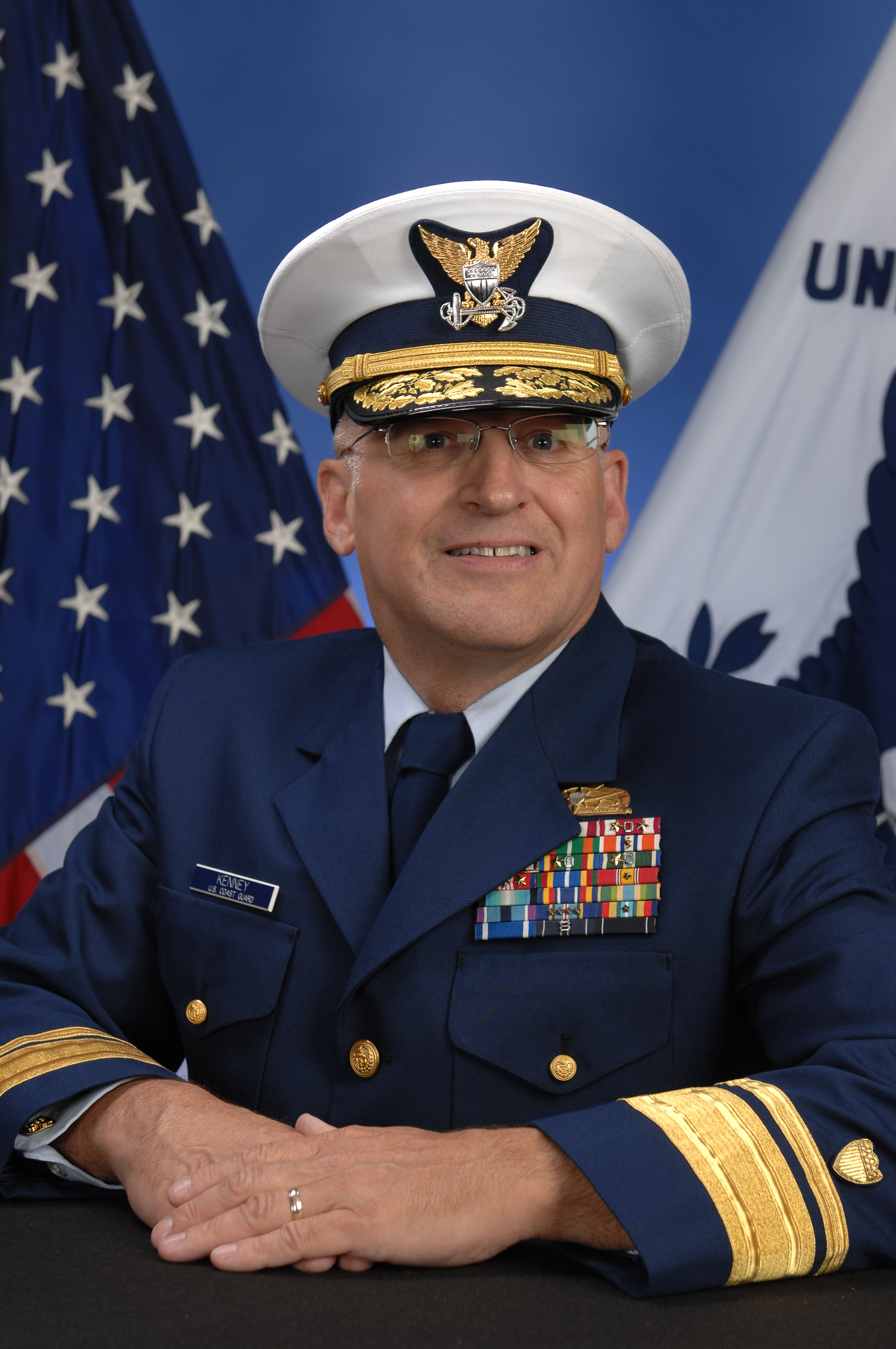
- Born: Frederick Joseph Kenney, Jr
- Military career
- Allegiance: United States
- Branch: United States Coast Guard
- Service years: 1981-2014
- Rank: Rear admiral
- Commands: United States Coast Guard Legal Division
- Awards: NATO Medal, Meritorious Service Medal, Legion of Merit Coast Guard Distinguished Service Medal

Frederick Joseph Kenney, Jr. is a retired American rear admiral who was formerly the Judge Advocate General of the United States Coast Guard, the highest-ranking attorney in the Coast Guard. In that role, he was responsible for over 180 uniformed and 90 civilian lawyers. From 2014 to 2023 he was the Director of Legal Affairs and External Relations at the International Maritime Organization (IMO), London, United Kingdom.

== Biography ==
Kenney is a graduate of Michigan State University and the University of San Francisco School of Law. He was commissioned in 1981 through Officer Candidate School. Some of his notable assignments include chief of the Office of Maritime and International Law, staff judge advocate of the First Coast Guard District, judge of the Coast Guard Court of Criminal Appeals, and commanding officer of the Coast Guard Pacific Area Tactical Law Enforcement Team. He was also an adjunct professor at Georgetown University Law Center. He is a Visiting Fellow at the Hilary Rodham Clinton School of Law, Swansea University, Wales.

Military offices
Preceded by William D. Baumgartner	Judge Advocate General of the United States Coast Guard; 2011 – 2014	Succeeded by RDML Steven D. Poulin
