= Coast Guard Intelligence =

Military intelligence branch of the US Coast Guard

- CGI

Agency overview
- Formed: 1915
- Jurisdiction: United States
- Employees: c. 1,500 (civilian and military)
- Parent agency: United States Coast Guard; Central Security Service
- Website: www.dco.uscg.mil/Our-Organization/Intelligence-CG-2/

Coast Guard Intelligence (CGI) is the military intelligence branch of the United States Coast Guard, and a component of the Central Security Service of the United States Department of Defense.

The United States Coast Guard is a military, multi-mission, maritime, uniformed service of the United States Department of Homeland Security and one of the United States's six armed services. Its core roles are to protect the public, the environment, and U.S. economic and security interests in any maritime region in which those interests may be at risk, including international waters and the U.S.'s coasts, ports, and inland waterways. The Coast Guard provides unique benefits to the nation because of its distinctive blend of military, humanitarian, and civilian law enforcement capabilities. To assist in accomplishing the many diverse missions of the Coast Guard, senior leadership and operational commanders rely on Coast Guard Intelligence.

Coast Guard intelligence came into existence in 1915 by the assignment of a "Chief Intelligence Officer" in Headquarters. Article 304 in the first set of Coast Guard Regulations provided for the establishment of a Chief Intelligence Officer who was to be attached to the Office of Assistant Commandant. The Chief Intelligence Officer's duties were spelled out in Article 614 of those same Regulations: "securing of information which is essential to the Coast Guard in carrying out its duties; for the dissemination of this information to responsible officers, operating units of the Coast Guard, the Treasury Department and other collaborating agencies; and the maintenance of adequate files and records of law enforcement activities."

The office was relatively unknown until the enactment of the Prohibition Act when CGI grew to a cadre of 45 investigators. CGI was extremely successful during prohibition and an Intelligence Division was established at Headquarters in 1930, followed by district intelligence offices in 1933.

During World War II, CGI was concerned with internal and domestic intelligence and counterintelligence. It was charged with conducting all necessary investigation of Coast Guard personnel, and all applicants for positions therein, as well as investigations of applicants for merchant marine documentation. Further, Coast Guard Intelligence was charged with conducting investigations in connection with the Coast Guard's regulatory functions, except Marine Inspection Regulations.

The modern Coast Guard Intelligence program has cultivated extensive relationships and partnerships with other elements of the Intelligence Community to provide timely, tailored support in a wide range of Coast Guard and national missions. These missions include port security, search and rescue, maritime safety, counter-narcotics, alien migration interdiction, and living marine resources protection. The Coast Guard Counterintelligence Service (CGCIS) falls under Coast Guard Intelligence and protects the Coast Guard from foreign agents who might attempt to penetrate their ranks or compromise their operations. This involves intelligence collection and analysis.

It is currently designated as part of the CG-2 directorate of Coast Guard headquarters.

== Assistant Commandant for Intelligence and Criminal Investigations ==
The Assistant Commandant for Intelligence and Criminal Investigations (CG-2) is Rear Admiral Rebecca Ore. She is responsible for directing, coordinating, and overseeing intelligence and investigative operations and activities that support all Coast Guard mission objectives, the National Strategy for Homeland Security, and National Security objectives.

== Transfer of Certain Functions to CGIS ==
In 1948, CGI became the primary investigative arm of the service. This mandate for an "investigative service" required that special agents conduct criminal, counterintelligence and personnel security investigations within the Coast Guard's area of responsibility. The majority of these investigations involved those criminal offenses which are in violation of the Uniform Code of Military Justice.

In 1996, in compliance with the President's Council on Integrity and Efficiency, the Coast Guard reorganized all criminal investigative and protective-services functions into the Coast Guard Investigative Service (CGIS). The centralization of CGIS meant reorganization from the top down. Special agents now worked for a regional Special Agent-in-Charge (SAC). The SACs were located in seven regional offices in Boston; Portsmouth, Virginia; Miami; Cleveland; New Orleans; Alameda, California; and Seattle. The SACs, in turn, reported to the director of CGIS at Headquarters who reported to the Chief of Operations and the vice commandant.

== Field Intelligence Support Teams ==
Field Intelligence Support Teams (FIST) are a vital component of the Coast Guard's Ports, Waterways, and Coastal Security (PWCS) mission and against the large number of threats to homeland security. According to the United States Coast Guard, the primary function of a FIST is to "collect Law Enforcement Intelligence on all maritime threats, exchange information through relationships with government and private entities, conduct first order analysis, and disseminate tactical and operational intelligence directly to port level commanders as well as other Coast Guard units and government agencies."

== Intelligence Community ==
On December 28, 2001, President George W. Bush signed legislation that amended the National Security Act of 1947 to make Coast Guard Intelligence a member of the Intelligence Community.

== United States Coast Guard Counterintelligence Service ==
The CGCIS protects the Coast Guard from foreign agents who might attempt to penetrate their ranks or compromise their operations. This involves investigations, operations, collection and analysis. The current director is Allen Morrison.

CGCIS is charged with shielding Coast Guard operations, personnel, systems, facilities and information from the intelligence activities of foreign intelligence entities, non-state actors, and the insider threat. CGCIS confronts these various threats by leveraging investigations, operations, collections, analysis, cyber counterintelligence activities, and appropriate partnerships in the intelligence and law enforcement communities.

== See also ==
- U.S. Coast Guard Investigative Service
- Central Security Service
- Office of Naval Intelligence
- Marine Corps Intelligence Activity
- U.S. Coast Guard Legal Division
- Maritime Awareness Global Network (MAGNet)
- Naval Criminal Investigative Service
