= Melissa Bert =

American admiral

- Born: New York, NY
- Allegiance: United States of America
- Branch: United States Coast Guard
- Service years: 1987 to 2023
- Rank: Rear Admiral
- Awards: Joint Superior Service Medal; Legion of Merit (2); Meritorious Service Medal (3)

Melissa Bert last served as the Judge Advocate General and Chief Counsel of the United States Coast Guard. Rear Admiral (Upper Half) (RADM) Bert is the first woman to serve in this position. Prior flag assignments held by RADM Bert include the U.S. Coast Guard’s Director of Governmental and Public Affairs and Deputy Director of Operations for U.S. Northern Command.

RADM Bert founded and launched the U.S. Coast Guard Women's Leadership Initiative, supporting mentoring and professional development for Coast Guard women in uniform and civilians throughout the service.

== Personal life ==
RADM Bert was born in New York, NY. Her father, Ellis Bert, was a career Civil Rights Attorney, and her mother Allyne Bert (née Sackley), an elementary school teacher. Her sister, Alison Bert, trained as a classical guitarist, and later worked as a journalist and photographer. RADM Bert and her husband met in Miami, FL and they have one child.

== Education ==
RADM Bert earned a Juris Doctor from George Washington Law School and her Bachelor of Science degree from the U.S. Coast Guard Academy. She attended the Harvard Kennedy School as a National Security Fellow, where she focused on Arctic development and the Law of the Sea. RADM Bert later spent a year at the Council on Foreign Relations link as a senior military fellow. In both institutions, she provided thoughtful analysis of national security issues in the maritime sector, publishing in the New York Times, the Miami Herald, the Boston Globe, and academic journals.

== Career ==
Following her graduation from the U.S. Coast Guard Academy, RADM Bert served aboard two Coast Guard cutters, including as Executive Officer of the Cutter Red Birch in Baltimore, MD. During the attacks of 9/11, RADM Bert was the Operations Officer for Coast Guard Sector Los Angeles/Long Beach, protecting one of the nation's most valuable ports.

In her legal career, she has served as a prosecutor, a Military Judge, Ethics Advisor, and as the Deputy Staff Judge Advocate for the Seventh District in Miami, Florida.

RADM Bert was the Speechwriter and Special Assistant to then Commandant of the Coast Guard, Admiral Thad Allen. In that role, she marketed the Coast Guard through strategic engagement opportunities and the drafting of persuasive policy speeches for national and international audiences.

RADM Bert also commanded Sector Juneau and direct mission execution in the unique environment of Southeastern Alaska. This command was geographically positioned to cover a 500-mile, environmentally-sensitive, panhandle of Southeastern Alaska and home to the fishing, cruise ship, and maritime tourism industries of the region.

She later headed the Coast Guard's Maritime and International Law Office providing legal advice on a variety of policies—including the Law of the Sea, drug and migrant interdiction, homeland security, search and rescue, pollution response, port and vessel safety/security, piracy, counter-terrorism, Arctic policy, environmental protection, and intelligence collection.

RADM Bert further served as the Chief of Staff for the Seventh Coast Guard District, the Coast Guard's largest regional command. There she was responsible for oversight of Coast Guard budget, people, and operations in the Southeastern United States, Puerto Rico, the Virgin Islands, and the Bahamas.

Following her promotion to flag-rank in 2016, RADM Bert served as the Deputy Director of Operations for the U.S. Northern Command, overseeing homeland defense and defense support for civil authorities for North America, as well as theater security cooperation with Mexico and The Bahamas. RADM Bert led the Northern Command's Future Operations Center in response to the devastating 2017 hurricane season of Hurricanes Harvey, Irma, and Maria.

From June 2018 to April 2020, RADM Bert served as the Director of Governmental and Public Affairs at Coast Guard Headquarters in Washington, D.C., where she synchronized the service's external engagement with Congress, the media, and strategic partners and stakeholders. In this role, she provided strategic, executive-level advisement for a high-profile communications outreach and public relations program for the Coast Guard.

From April 2020 to April 2023, RADM Bert assumed the role of Judge Advocate General and Chief Counsel of the Coast Guard. She led over 500 attorneys and legal professionals providing counsel on all Coast Guard missions and people, as well as Congressional, Inter-Agency and Maritime Industry.engagement.

Admiral Bert served as the head of government and public affairs for the Coast Guard from 2018 to 2020 and as the Judge Advocate General of the Coast Guard from 2020 to 2023. During this period, the Coast Guard allegedly covered up investigations into sexual assaults that occurred at the Coast Guard Academy, a controversy known as "Fouled Anchor." These allegations came to light shortly after Admiral Bert's retirement. According to CNN, Admiral Bert acknowledged that the agency could have been more transparent, but was concerned with the privacy of victims, who were to personally receive both their own investigation results, as well as the findings of the limited scope investigation. She also cited "constant turnover" within the organization as a contributing factor. She remarked, "At some point, it was not the top thing on somebody’s mind. There is so much going on in the Coast Guard." This was at the start of the COVID epidemic.

According to a 2024 Senate Permanent Subcommittee on Investigations Report, “On October 31, 2018, an “external engagement discussion” was scheduled between then-Vice Commandant Admiral Ray and the then-Director of Governmental and Public Affairs. As part of the briefing, records suggest that Admiral Ray was provided a detailed memo outlining options for external disclosure of Operation Fouled Anchor. The memo, entitled “CGA Sexual Assault Investigations – Pre-2006 Communications COA’s,” provided three options for disclosure, as well as analysis of the drawbacks and benefits of each option.”

The report continues: "According to the memo, it was recommended that the Coast Guard not affirmatively disclose information regarding Operation Fouled Anchor, but instead only respond to queries from Congress about individual cases. As part of the scenario of proactively notifying Congress about Operation Fouled Anchor, which the memo recommended against, the memo stated, 'any affirmative Congressional or external communication, especially if briefed under a singular investigatory moniker with a colorful title, vice separate investigations, will risk the initiation of comprehensive Congressional investigations, hearings, and media interest.'”

=== Other professional endeavors ===
RADM Bert has taught as an adjunct professor at George Washington University, Florida International University, and the University of Miami School of Law.

She is a life member of the Council on Foreign Relations and a Proctor in Admiralty in the U.S. Maritime Law Association. Additionally, RADM Bert was awarded Young Military Lawyer of the Year for the Coast Guard by the American Bar Association in 1997. In May 2006, she received the Judge Advocates Association Outstanding Career Armed Services Attorney Award. RADM Bert is a member of the Florida Bar Association and the District of Columbia Bar Association.

RADM Bert previously served as Vice Chair of the Coast Guard Academy Alumni Association Board of Directors. In her Washington, DC community, she provided pro bono legal services to the District of Columbia Superior Court Family Law Clinic.

== Publications ==
RADM Bert has published the following articles:

- Bert, Melissa (March 7, 2012). "Addressing the Risk of a Cuban Oil Spill". Council on Foreign Relations.
- Bert, Melissa (March 5, 2012). "Missing at Sea in Costa Incident: Leadership". Miami Herald.
- Bert, Melissa (February 10, 2012). "The Arctic is Now: Economic and National Security in the Last Frontier". American Foreign Policy Interests. 34: 5–19. doi:10.1080/10803920.2012.653940. S2CID 154098611.
- Bert, Melissa (February 16, 2012). "A Strategy to Advance the Arctic Economy". Council on Foreign Relations.
- Bert, Melissa (September 27, 2011). "Look North America". New York Times.
- Bert, Melissa (March 16, 2009). "Ratifying the Law of the Sea". Boston Globe.

== See also ==
- List of female United States military generals and flag officers
- Women in the United States Coast Guard
