= Coast Guard Investigative Service =

Division of the United States Coast Guard

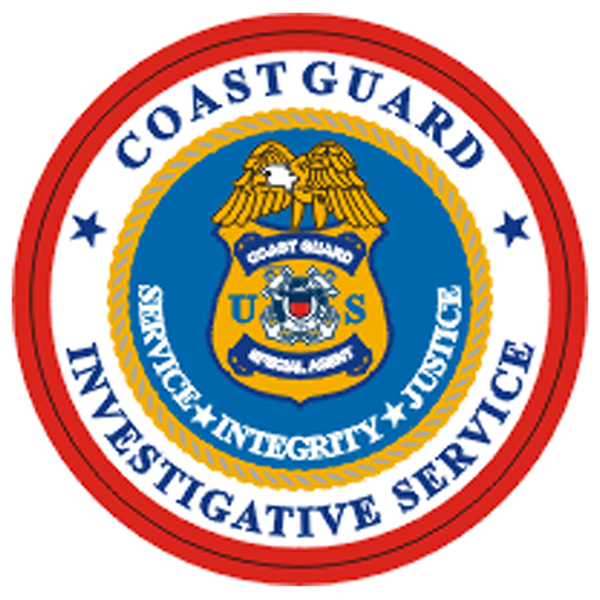
- Coast Guard Investigative Service seal

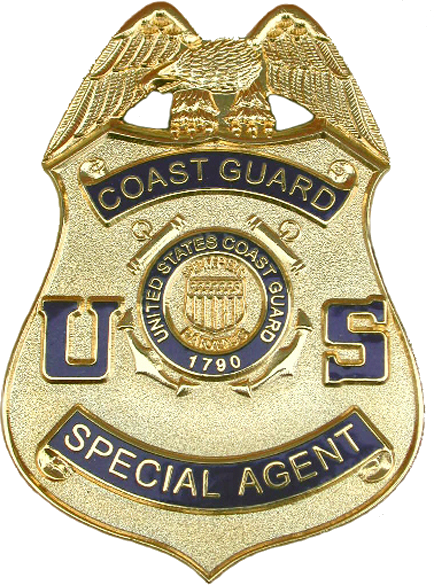
- CGIS Special Agent badge
- Abbreviation: CGIS
- Motto: "Service, Integrity, Justice!"

Jurisdictional structure
- Federal agency: United States
- Operations jurisdiction: United States
- Constituting instrument: 14 U.S.C. § 525
- General nature: Federal law enforcement; Military provost

Operational structure
- Headquarters: Douglas A. Munro Coast Guard Headquarters Building, Washington, D.C., U.S.
- Agency executive: Jeremy R. Gauthier, Director
- Parent agency: United States Coast Guard

Website
- uscg.mil/coast-guard-investigative-service

The Coast Guard Investigative Service (CGIS) is a division of the United States Coast Guard that investigates crimes where the U.S. Coast Guard has an interest. It is composed of civilian (GS-1811), active duty, reserve enlisted, and warrant officer special agents.

== Mission ==
The mission of the Coast Guard Investigative Service (CGIS) is to conduct professional criminal investigations, engage in law enforcement information and intelligence collection, provide protective services, and establish and maintain law enforcement liaison directed at preserving the integrity of the Coast Guard, protecting the welfare of Coast Guard personnel, and supporting Coast Guard and Department of Homeland Security (DHS) maritime law enforcement and counter-terrorism missions worldwide.

== Authority ==
The Coast Guard Investigative Service is a federal law enforcement agency whose law enforcement authority is derived from 14 U.S.C. § 525. This authority provides for Coast Guard special agents to conduct investigations of actual, alleged or suspected criminal activity; carry firearms; execute and serve warrants; and make arrests for all crimes under the jurisdiction of the United States. The criminal investigative function of the Coast Guard Investigative Service is similar to that of a major crimes unit at a large metropolitan police department, investigating crimes such as those "internal" to the Coast Guard, including fraud, larceny, homicide and rape, as well as "external" investigations of maritime-related crimes ranging from migrant and drug smuggling, homicide, rape, false distress calls, and violations of the environmental laws. The Coast Guard Investigative Service is a centralized directorship managed by a professional criminal investigator who reports directly to the Coast Guard's Vice Commandant of the Coast Guard. It is located outside the Coast Guard's operational chain of command.

== Responsibilities ==
=== Criminal investigations ===
- Felony violations of the Uniform Code of Military Justice (UCMJ)
- United States Code violations related to or within the maritime jurisdiction of the U.S.
- Counter-narcotics and alien-smuggling investigations
- Fisheries Violations and Environmental Crimes
- Counter-terrorism and force protection
- Investigative assistance to federal, state and local law enforcement
- Protective service operations

=== Commandant/Vice Commandant of the Coast Guard ===
- Assistance to U.S. Secret Service Presidential Detail
- Other foreign and domestic dignitaries as requested

=== Intelligence operations ===
- Human intelligence (HUMINT) collection operations
- Image intelligence collection operations (IMINT)
- Law enforcement information collection
- Counterintelligence functions are investigated by the Coast Guard Counterintelligence Service as part of U.S. Coast Guard Intelligence.

=== Anti-fraud, waste and abuse ===
- Department of Homeland Security Office of Inspector General Hotline complaint investigations
- TRICARE medical fraud investigations
- Contract fraud investigations

=== Task force and liaison activities ===
- FBI Joint Terrorism Task Force (JTTF)
- Organized Crime Drug Enforcement Task Force (OCDETF)
- High Intensity Drug Trafficking Area (HIDTA) Task Force
- Border Enforcement Security Team (BEST)

=== International policing ===
- INTERPOL
- International Association of Chiefs of Police (IACP)

== CGIS Special Agents ==
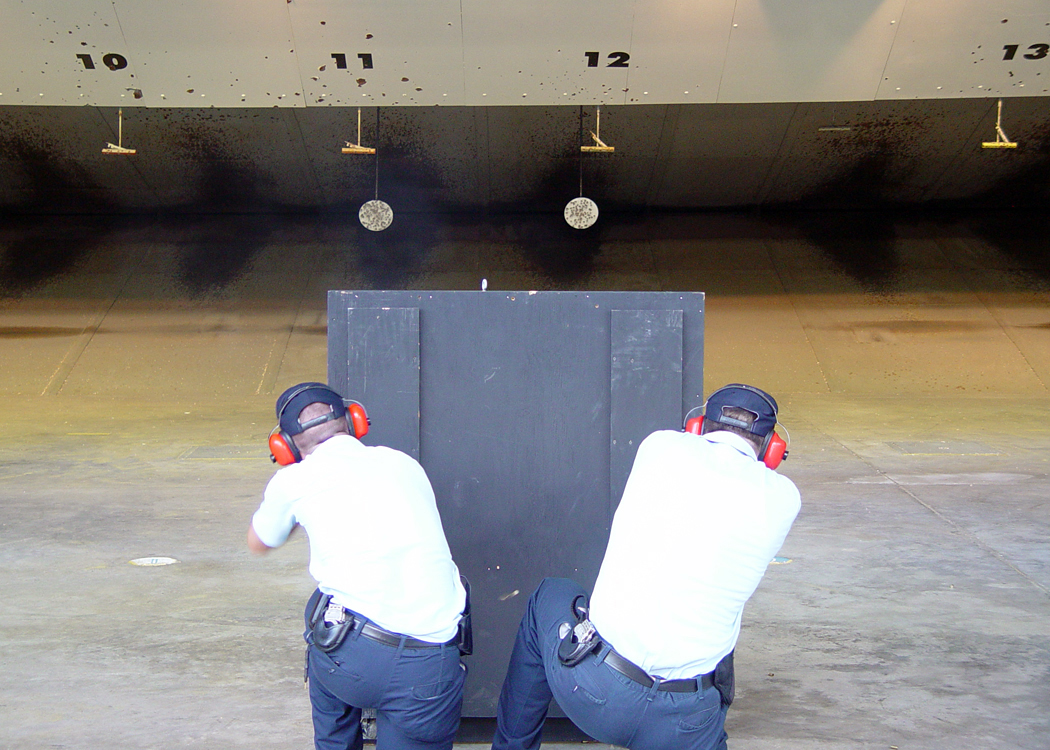
CGIS agents conducting firearms training

The CGIS special agent workforce is composed of active duty military, reserve, and civilian personnel. All CGIS Special Agents are sworn personnel with powers of arrest and warrant service. All CGIS Special Agents have full arrest powers under Title 14 section 95 of the United States Code.

The active duty military component is composed of enlisted personnel, chief warrant officer and commissioned officer investigator positions. The civilian component is composed of GS-1811-11 to SES criminal investigator positions.

== Firearms ==
The Coast Guard Investigative Service's standard issue firearm is the Glock 19M.

== Appearance in popular culture ==
- Dave Barry's 2002 novel Tricky Business features a CGIS special agent as an undercover operative aboard a gambling ship harbored in Miami, Florida, which the Coast Guard suspects is being used for money laundering and transacting illegal narcotics while at sea.
- In March 2010, the character of Abigail Borin, a fictional CGIS special agent portrayed by actress Diane Neal, appeared on the hit television drama NCIS in an episode entitled "Jurisdiction". Special agent in Charge Borin appeared again in January 2011, in the episode "Ships in the Night", as CGIS joined the NCIS team in the investigation of the murder of a U.S. Marine Corps officer on a dinner boat cruise on the Potomac River. The story illustrates CGIS's law enforcement responsibilities along the United States' rivers, coastlines, and inland waterways in support of the Coast Guard. She returned for a third time in the episode "Safe Harbor", which had a plot that illustrated the role of the CGIS in supporting the Department of Homeland Security through maritime law enforcement and counter-terrorism missions worldwide. Borin also appeared in the 2012 episode "Lost at Sea," the 2013 episode "Oil and Water," and the 2014 episode "The San Dominick."
  - Neal reprised her role as special agent in charge Borin in the 2015 episode of NCIS: New Orleans "The Abyss," which showcases CGIS' role in interviewing and interrogating suspected terrorists aboard USCG vessels, and their role in the recovery of remains in U.S. waters. She returned in the subsequent episode "The Walking Dead," and again at the conclusion of the first season, bringing Borin's total appearances to 9.

== See also ==
- List of United States federal law enforcement agencies

=== Coast Guard ===
- U.S. Coast Guard Intelligence
- United States Coast Guard Police
- Maritime Law Enforcement Specialist
- U.S. Coast Guard Legal Division
- Coast Guard Court of Criminal Appeals

=== Federal law enforcement ===
- Special agent
- Military police
- Shore Patrol
- Naval Criminal Investigative Service
- Office of Air and Marine
- National Oceanic and Atmospheric Administration Fisheries Office of Law Enforcement (NOAA OLE)
- Diplomatic Security Service (DSS), U.S. Department of State
- U.S. Air Force Office of Special Investigations
- U.S. Army Criminal Investigation Command (USACIDC)
- United States Army Counterintelligence (USACI)
