= Awards and decorations of the United States Department of Homeland Security =

Awards and decorations of the United States Department of Homeland Security are those awards issued to members of the various agencies under the umbrella of the department and the Secretary of Homeland Security.

== Department wide ==
Homeland Security Distinguished Service Medal

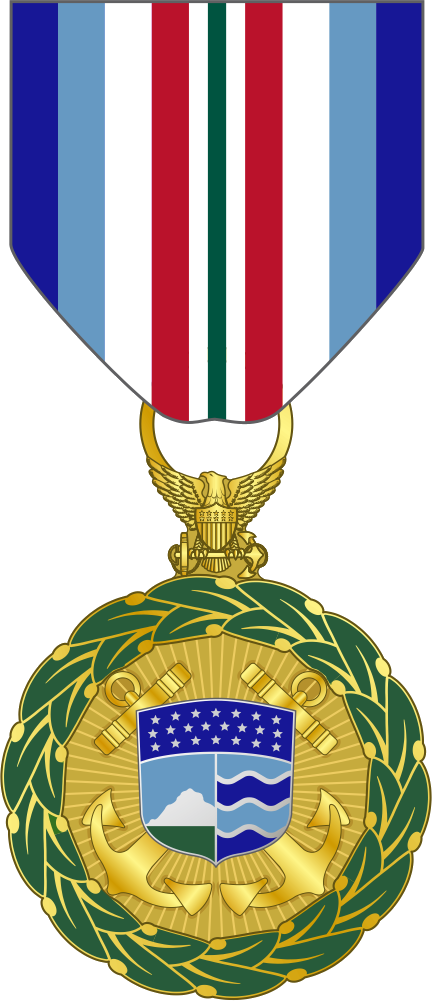

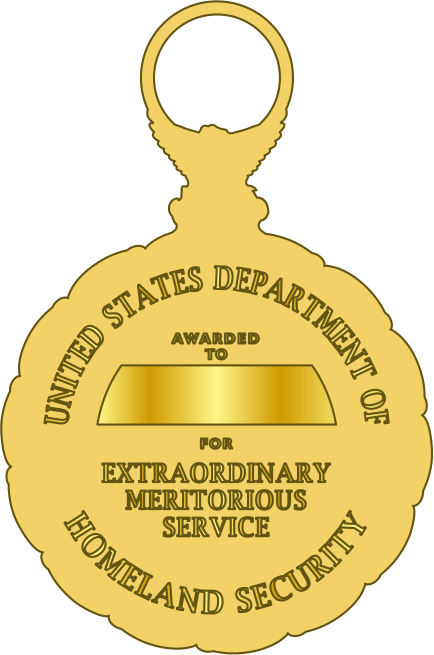

Awarded for exceptionally meritorious service in a duty of great responsibility.

== Customs and Border Protection, Air and Marine Operations ==
US Customs and Border Protection Air and Marine Operations Medal of Valor	US Customs and Border Protection Air and Marine Operations Purple Cross	US Customs and Border Protection Air and Marine Operations Commendation Medal	US Customs and Border Protection Air and Marine Operations Achievement Medal	US Customs and Border Protection Air and Marine Operations 20th Anniversary Medal

== Customs and Border Protection, Border Patrol ==
On August 8, 2002, the Border Patrol began its awards program; Chief Gustavo De La Viña awarded the first two medals. CBP along with the U.S. Army's Institute of Heraldry, developed the awards program, designing the medals and ribbons.

US Customs and Border Protection, Border Patrol Newton-Azrak Medal for Heroism	US Customs and Border Protection, Border Patrol Purple Cross Wound Award	US Customs and Border Protection, Border Patrol Commendation Award	US Customs and Border Protection, Border Patrol Achievement Award	US Customs and Border Protection, Border Patrol 75th Anniversary Medal
May be awarded to any USBP employee who performs a conspicuous act of heroism	May be awarded to any employee who, in the line of duty sustains a fatal injury, injury or wound creating a substantial risk of death, or permanent disfigurement or impairment	Awarded to an employee or a group for exceptional meritorious achievement or for extraordinary heroism.	Awarded to an employee or a group for meritorious achievement based on performance or for heroism.	Awarded to every Border Patrol Agent and Aircraft Pilot serving on and immediately before May 28, 1999.
US Customs and Border Protection, Border Patrol Centennial Commemoration Medal	US Customs and Border Protection, Border Patrol Commissioner's Meritorious Service Achievement Award	US Customs and Border Protection, Border Patrol Commissioner's Exceptional Service Award	Border Patrol Long Service Award	Border Patrol Commissioner’s Special Commendation Award
Awarded to every Border Patrol Agent and Aircraft Pilot serving on and immediately before May 28, 2024	The accomplishment of assigned duties in such an outstanding manner as to be clearly noteworthy among all those who have performed similar duties, or performance of assigned tasks.	The performance of service in the public interest and is outstanding and distinctive in terms of improved operations of the Service’s mission.	Service of 20 years as a Border Patrol agent and/or pilot with ribbon drape attachments authorized for 25-, 30-, and 35 years of service. No longer issued under CPB	Exceptional service in an administrative or operational program and achievement by an individual in his/her work responsibilities. No longer issued under CPB
US Customs and Border Protection, Survivor Recognition Medallion	US Customs and Border Protection, Border Patrol Commissioner’s Excellence in Group Achievement Award	Commissioner’s Border Patrol Academy Honor Graduate Ribbon		
		Ribbon Only		
	Awarded for improved production, decreased backlogs, accomplishment of goals or operational improvement. No longer issued under CPB	U.S. Border Patrol Academy Honor Graduates ranking 1st, 2nd, and 3rd academically, and those graduating 1st in driver training, physical training, and firearms training.		
