= Coast Guard Air Station Detroit =

US Coast Guard base near Detroit, Michigan, United States

- Coast Guard Air Station Detroit unit patch
- Active: 1966 to present
- Country: United States
- Branch: United States Coast Guard
- Type: Air Station
- Role: Search and Rescue
- Size: 104 active personnel

Commanders
- Commanding Officer: CDR Christian Polyak

Aircraft flown
- Helicopter: MH-65E

Coast Guard Air Station Detroit is an Air Station of the United States Coast Guard located in Detroit, Michigan. The station was established in 1966 and is located on Selfridge Air National Guard base. Early aircraft consisted of three HH-52A Seaguard helicopters with an area of operations encompassing Lakes Ontario, Erie, St. Clair and southern Lake Huron. During the summer months they assume responsibility for the southern portion of Lake Michigan and operate from an Air Facilities located in Muskegon, Michigan, and Waukegan, Illinois. Air Station Detroit conducts flights in support of domestic icebreaking operations, marine environmental protection, and search and rescue missions. Most notably they responded to several rescue missions during Hurricane Katrina of 2005. Today they support 30 Coast Guard shore units, five cutters, as well as federal, state, local, and Canadian government agencies. Detroit aircrews handle over 200 rescues annually. Currently the air station houses five MH-65E Dolphin helicopters.

== See also ==
- Joint Rescue Coordination Centre Trenton - responsible for coastal rescue operations (involves Royal Canadian Air Force and Canadian Coast Guard) in Canada and based out from CFB Trenton
