= Julian Assange =

Australian WikiLeaks editor (born 1971)

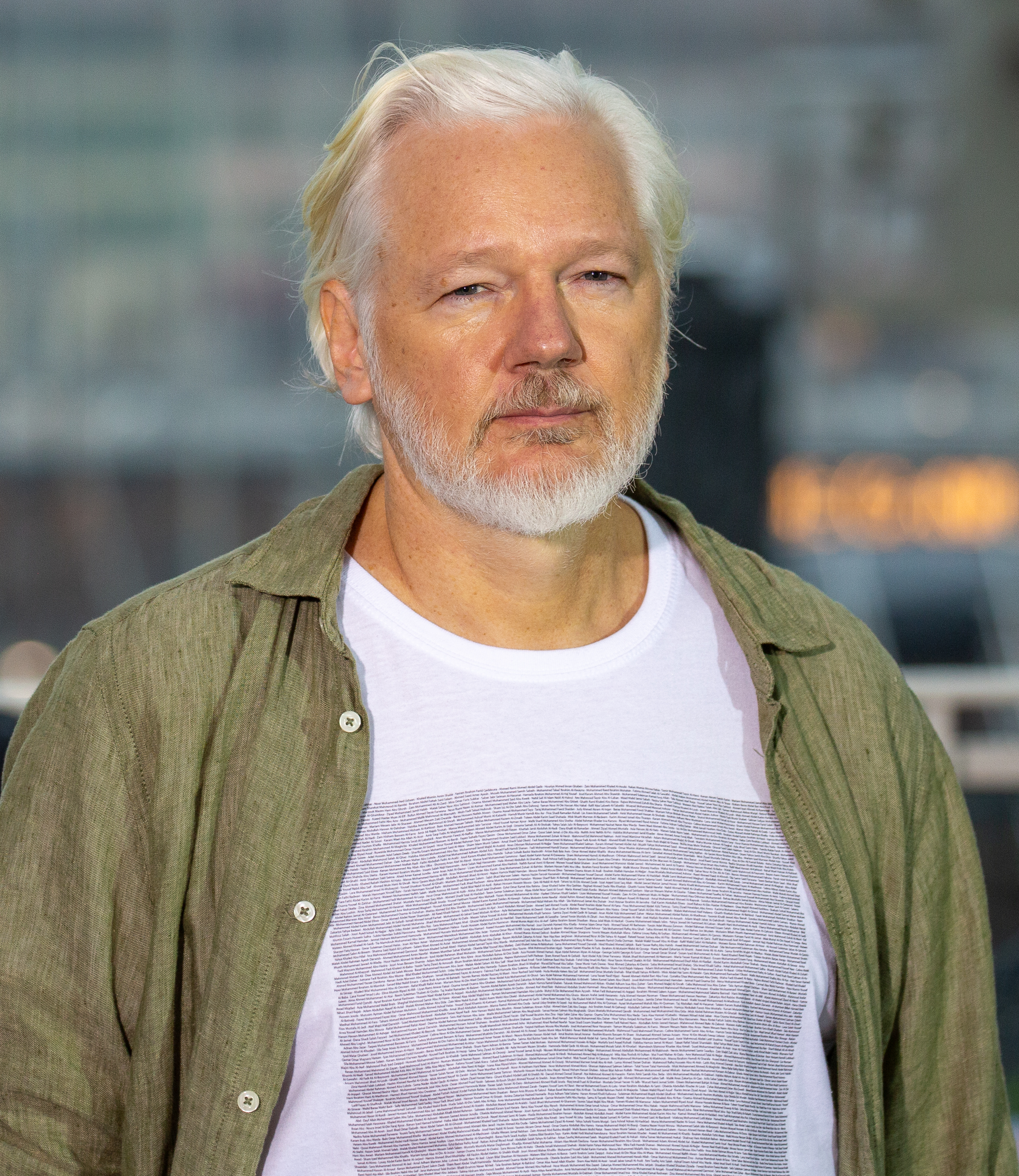
- Assange at the 2025 Cannes Film Festival (Note: The shirt Assange wore at the festival carried the names of 4,986 Palestinian children killed in the Gaza war.)
- Born: Julian Paul Hawkins; 3 July 1971 (age 55); Townsville, Queensland, Australia
- Citizenship: Australia; Ecuador (2017–2021)
- Occupations: Editor; publisher
- Known for: Founder and publisher of WikiLeaks
- Title: Director and editor-in-chief of WikiLeaks (2006–2018); publisher (since 2018)
- Political party: WikiLeaks Party (2013–2015)
- Criminal charges: Failure to surrender to the court (2022); Conspiracy to Obtain and Disclose National Defence Information (2024)
- Criminal penalty: 50 weeks imprisonment (2022); 62 months (5 years, 2 months) time served (2024)
- Spouses: Teresa Assange (m. 1989; div. 1999); Stella Assange (m. 2022)

Julian Paul Assange (/əˈsɑːnʒ/ ə-SAHNZH; né Hawkins; born 3 July 1971) is an Australian programmer, editor, and publisher who founded WikiLeaks in 2006. He came to international attention in 2010 after WikiLeaks published a series of leaks from Chelsea Manning, a United States Army intelligence analyst: footage of a U.S. airstrike in Baghdad that killed civilians, U.S. military logs from the Afghanistan and Iraq wars, and U.S. diplomatic cables. Assange has won over two dozen awards for publishing and journalism.

Assange was raised in various places around Australia until his family settled in Melbourne in his middle teens. He became involved in the hacker community and was convicted of hacking in 1996. Following the establishment of WikiLeaks, Assange was its editor when it published the Bank Julius Baer documents, footage of the 2008 Tibetan unrest, and a report on political killings in Kenya with The Sunday Times. Publication of the leaks from Manning started in February 2010.

In November 2010 the Swedish Police Authority wanted to question Assange in an investigation and sought to extradite him from the UK. In June 2012, Assange breached his bail and took refuge in the Embassy of Ecuador in London. He was granted asylum by Ecuador in August 2012 on the grounds of political persecution and fears he might be extradited to the United States. Swedish prosecutors dropped their investigation in 2019. In 2013, Assange launched the WikiLeaks Party and unsuccessfully stood for the Australian Senate while remaining in the embassy. During the 2016 U.S. presidential election campaign, WikiLeaks published confidential Democratic Party emails, showing that the party's national committee favoured Hillary Clinton over Bernie Sanders in the primaries and it had sought to undermine the Sanders campaign. In March 2017, WikiLeaks published a series of documents which detailed the CIA's tools for hacking into smartphones and other internet devices, after which senior CIA officials discussed potentially kidnapping or assassinating Assange.

On 11 April 2019 Assange's asylum was withdrawn following a series of disputes with Ecuadorian authorities; the police were invited into the London embassy and he was arrested. A British judge found him guilty of breaching bail and sentenced him to 50 weeks in prison. The U.S. government unsealed an indictment charging Assange with conspiracy to commit computer intrusion related to the leaks provided by Manning. In May 2019 and June 2020, the U.S. government unsealed new indictments against Assange, charging him with violating the Espionage Act of 1917 and alleging he had conspired with hackers. The key witness for the new indictment, whom the justice department had given immunity in return for giving evidence, stated in 2021 that he had fabricated his testimony. Critics described these charges as an unprecedented challenge to press freedom with potential implications for investigative journalism worldwide. Assange was incarcerated in HM Prison Belmarsh in London from April 2019 to June 2024, as the U.S. government's extradition effort was contested in the UK courts. In 2022, the incoming Labor government of Anthony Albanese reversed the position of previous Australian governments and said it would lobby for Assange's release.

In 2024, following a High Court ruling that granted Assange a full appeal to extradition, Assange and his lawyers negotiated a plea deal with US prosecutors. Assange pleaded guilty in Saipan, Northern Mariana Islands, to an Espionage Act charge of conspiring to obtain and disclose classified U.S. national defence documents, in return for a sentence of time served. Following the hearing Assange flew to Australia, arriving on 26 June 2024.

== Early life ==
Assange was born Julian Paul Hawkins on 3 July 1971 in Townsville, Queensland, to Christine Ann Hawkins, a visual artist, and John Shipton, an anti-war activist and builder. The couple separated before their son was born. When Julian was a year old his mother married Brett Assange, an actor with whom she ran a small theatre company and whom Julian Assange regards as his father (choosing Assange as his surname). Christine and Brett Assange divorced around 1979. Christine then became involved with Leif Meynell, also known as Leif Hamilton, whom Julian Assange later described as "a member of an Australian cult" called The Family. Meynell and Christine Assange separated in 1982.

Julian Assange lived in more than thirty Australian towns and cities during his childhood. He attended several schools, including Goolmangar Primary School in New South Wales (1979–1983) and Townsville State High School in Queensland as well as being schooled at home. In his mid-teens, he settled with his mother and half-brother in Melbourne. He moved in with his girlfriend Teresa at age 17.

Assange studied programming, mathematics, and physics at Central Queensland University (1994) and the University of Melbourne (2003–2006), but did not complete a degree. Assange started the Puzzle Hunt tradition at the University of Melbourne, which was modelled after the MIT Mystery Hunt. He was involved in the Melbourne rave scene, and assisted in installing an internet kiosk at Ollie Olsen's club night called "Psychic Harmony", which was held at Dream nightclub. Assange's nickname at the raves was "Prof".

=== Hacking ===
By 1987, aged 16, Assange had become a skilled hacker under the name Mendax, taken from Horace's splendide mendax (Latin for "nobly untruthful"). Around this time, the police raided his mother's home and confiscated his equipment. According to Assange, "it involved some dodgy character who was alleging that we had stolen five hundred thousand dollars from Citibank". Ultimately, no charges were raised and his equipment was returned, but Assange "decided that it might be wise to be a bit more discreet".

In 1988 Assange used social engineering to get the password to Australia's Overseas Telecommunications Commission's mainframes. Assange had a self-imposed set of ethics: he did not damage or crash systems or data he hacked, and he shared information. The Sydney Morning Herald later opined that he had become one of Australia's "most notorious hackers", and The Guardian said that by 1991 he was "probably Australia's most accomplished hacker". Assange's official biography on WikiLeaks called him Australia's "most famous ethical computer hacker", and the earliest version said he "hacked thousands of systems, including the Pentagon" when he was younger.

He and two others, known as "Trax" and "Prime Suspect", formed a hacking group called "the International Subversives". According to NPR, David Leigh, and Luke Harding, Assange may have been involved in the WANK hack at NASA in 1989, but this has never been proven. Assange called it "the origin of hacktivism", and the Swedish television documentary WikiRebels, which was made with Assange's cooperation, also hinted he was involved.

In mid-1991 the three hackers began targeting MILNET, a data network used by the US military, where Assange found reports he said showed the US military was hacking other parts of itself. Assange found a backdoor and later said they "had control over it for two years." In 2012 Ken Day, the former head of the Australian Federal Police computer crime team, said that there had been no evidence the International Subversives had hacked MILNET. In response to Assange's statements about accessing MILNET, Day said that "Assange may still be liable to prosecution for that act—if it can be proved."

Assange wrote a program called Sycophant that allowed the International Subversives to conduct "massive attacks on the US military". The International Subversives regularly hacked into systems belonging to a "who's who of the U.S. military-industrial complex" and the network of Australia National University. Assange later said he had been "a famous teenage hacker in Australia, and I've been reading generals' emails since I was 17". Assange has attributed his motivation to this experience with power.

=== Arrest and trial ===
The Australian Federal Police (AFP) set up an investigation called Operation Weather targeting The International Subversives. In September 1991 Assange was discovered hacking into the Melbourne master terminal of Nortel, a Canadian multinational telecommunications corporation. Another member of the International Subversives turned in himself and the others, and the AFP tapped Assange's phone line (he was using a modem) and raided his home at the end of October.

The earliest detailed reports about Assange are 1990s Australian press reports on him and print and TV news of his trial. He was charged in 1994 with 31 counts of crimes related to hacking, including defrauding Telecom Australia, fraudulent use of a telecommunications network, obtaining access to information, erasing data, and altering data. According to Assange, the only data he inserted or deleted was his program. The prosecution argued that a magazine written by the International Subversives would encourage others to hack, calling it a "hacker's manual" and alleging that Assange and the other hackers posted information online about how to hack into computers they had accessed. His trial date was set in May 1995 and his case was presented to the Supreme Court of Victoria, but the court did not take the case, sending it back to the County Court. Assange fell into a deep depression while waiting for his trial and checked himself into a psychiatric hospital; he then spent six months sleeping in the wilderness around Melbourne.

In December 1996, facing a theoretical sentence of 290 years in prison, he struck a plea deal and pleaded guilty to 24 hacking charges. The judge called the charges "quite serious" and initially thought a jail term would be necessary but ultimately sentenced Assange to a fine of A$2,100 and released him on a A$5,000 good behaviour bond because of his disrupted childhood and the absence of malicious or mercenary intent. After his sentencing, Assange told the judge that he had "been misled by the prosecution in terms of the charges" and "a great misjustice has been done". The judge told Assange "you have pleaded guilty, the proceedings are over" and advised him to be quiet. Assange has described the trial as a formative period and according to The New Republic, "the experience set him on the intellectual path" leading him to found WikiLeaks.

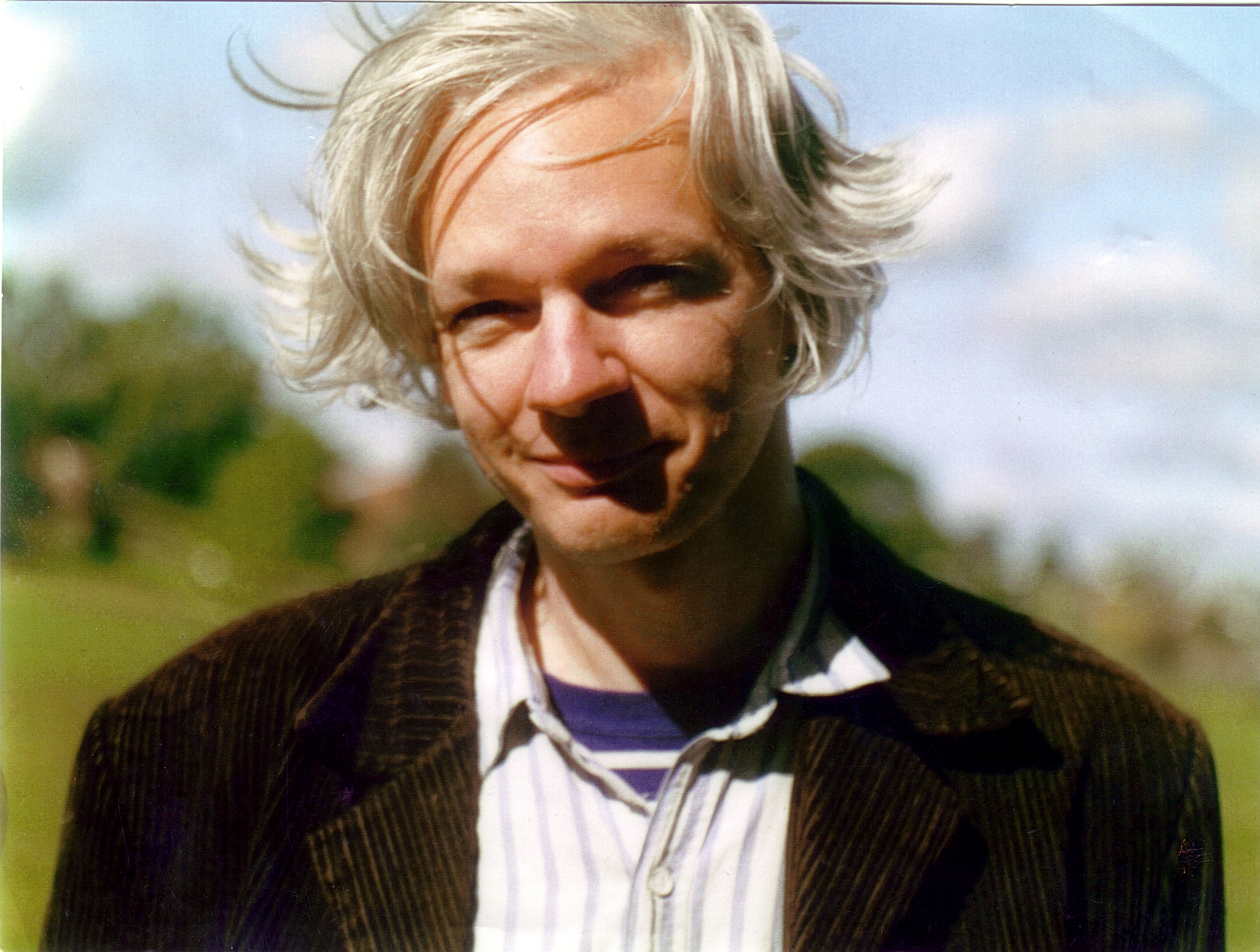
Assange, about 2006

In 1993, Assange provided technical advice and support to help the Victoria Police Child Exploitation Unit to prosecute individuals responsible for publishing and distributing child pornography. His lawyers said he was pleased to assist, emphasising that he received no benefit for this and was not an informer. His role in helping the police was discussed during his 1996 sentencing on computer hacking charges. According to his mother, Assange also helped police "remove a book on the Internet about how to build a bomb".

=== Cypherpunks and programming ===
In the same year, he took over running one of the first public Internet service providers (ISPs) in Australia, Suburbia Public Access Network, when its original owner, Mark Dorset, moved to Sydney. He joined the cypherpunk mailing list in late 1993 or early 1994. According to Robert Manne, Assange's main political focus at this time seems to have been the information-sharing possibilities created by the internet and its threats. He began programming in 1994, authoring or co-authoring network and encryption programs, such as the Rubberhose deniable encryption system. Assange wrote other programs to make the Internet more accessible and developed cyber warfare systems like the Strobe port scanner which could look for weaknesses in hundreds of thousands of computers at any one time.

During this period of time he also moderated the AUCRYPTO forum, ran a website that gave advice on computer security to 5,000 subscribers in 1996, and contributed research to Suelette Dreyfus's Underground (1997), a book about Australian hackers including the International Subversives. According to Assange, he "deliberately minimized" his role in Underground so it could "pull in the whole community".

In 1998 he co-founded with Trax the "network intrusion detection technologies" company Earthmen Technology which developed Linux kernel hacking tools. During this period he also earned a sizeable income working as a consultant for large corporations. In October 1998, Assange decided to visit friends and announced on the cypherpunks mailing list he would be "hopscotching" through Russia, Mongolia, China, Poland and Eastern Europe.

=== Leaks ===
According to Assange, in the 1990s, he and Suburbia Public Access Network facilitated leaks for activists and lawyers. Assange told Suelette Dreyfus that he had "acted as a conduit for leaked documents" when fighting local corruption. While awaiting trial and trying to get custody of his son Daniel, Assange and his mother formed the activist organisation Parent Inquiry Into Child Protection. An article in the Canadian magazine Maclean's later referred to it as "a low-tech rehearsal for WikiLeaks". The group used the Australian Freedom of Information Act to obtain documents, and secretly recorded meetings with Health and Community Services. The group also used flyers to encourage insiders to anonymously come forward, and according to Assange they "had moles who were inside dissidents." An insider leaked a key internal departmental manual about the rules for custody disputes to the group.

In November 1996 Assange sent an email to lists he had created and mentioned a "LEAKS" project. Assange stated that he registered the domain "leaks.org" in 1999, but did not use it. He publicised a patent granted to the National Security Agency in August 1999, for voice-data harvesting technology saying "This patent should worry people. Everyone's overseas phone calls are or may soon be tapped, transcribed and archived in the bowels of an unaccountable foreign spy agency."

== WikiLeaks ==
=== Early publications ===
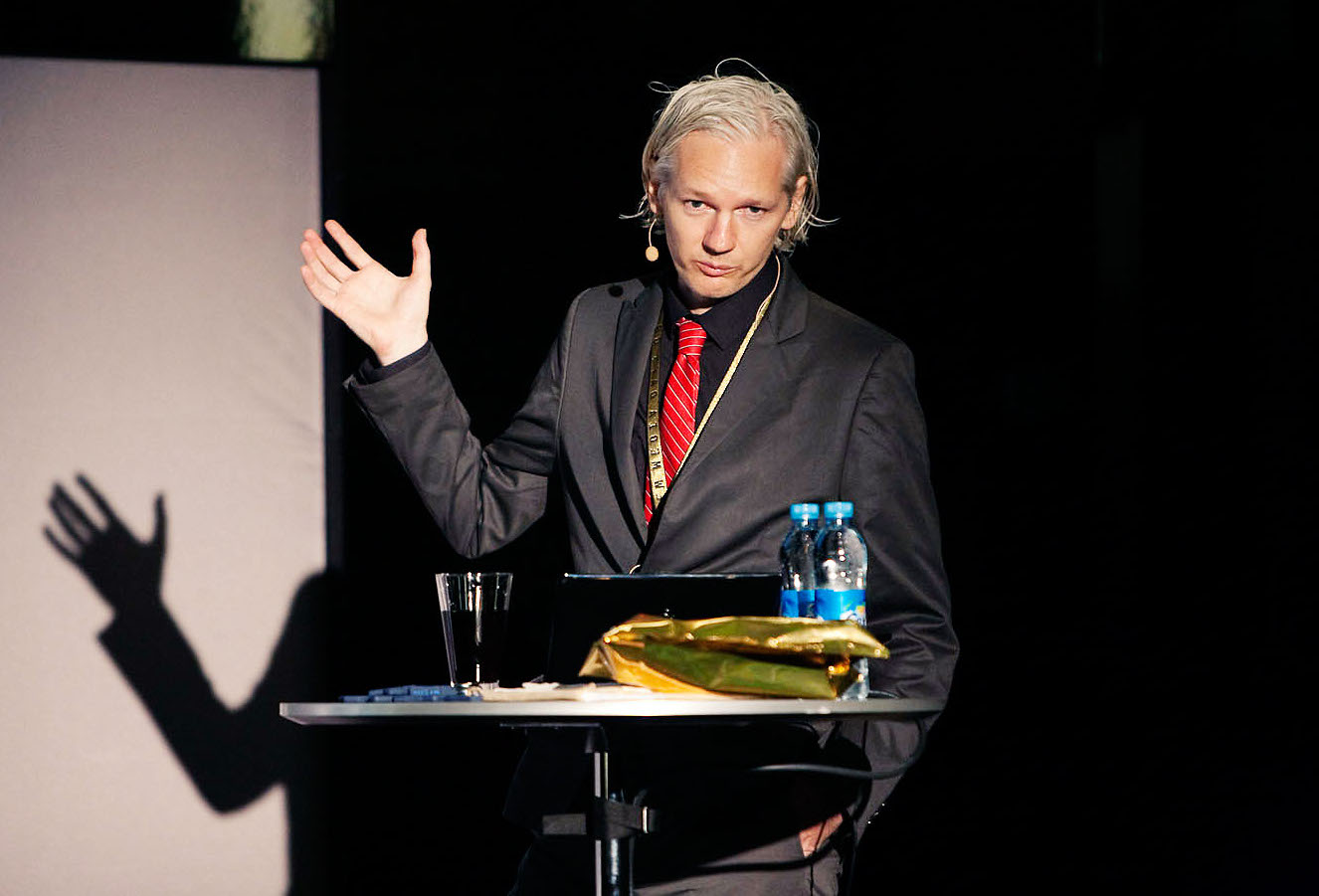
Assange at the "New Media Days 09" in Copenhagen, November 2009

Assange and a group of other dissidents, mathematicians and activists established WikiLeaks in 2006. Assange became a member of its advisory board. From 2007 to 2010, Assange travelled continuously on WikiLeaks business, visiting Africa, Asia, Europe, and North America.

In December 2006, the month WikiLeaks posted its first leak, Assange published a five-page essay that outlined the "thought experiment" behind the WikiLeaks strategy: use leaks to force organisations to reduce levels of abuse and dishonesty or pay "secrecy tax" to be secret but inefficient. Assange explained:

The more secretive or unjust an organization is, the more leaks induce fear and paranoia in the leadership and planning coterie. This must result in minimization of efficient internal communications mechanisms (an increase in cognitive "secrecy tax") and consequent system-wide cognitive decline resulting in decreased ability to hold onto power as the environment demands adaptation.

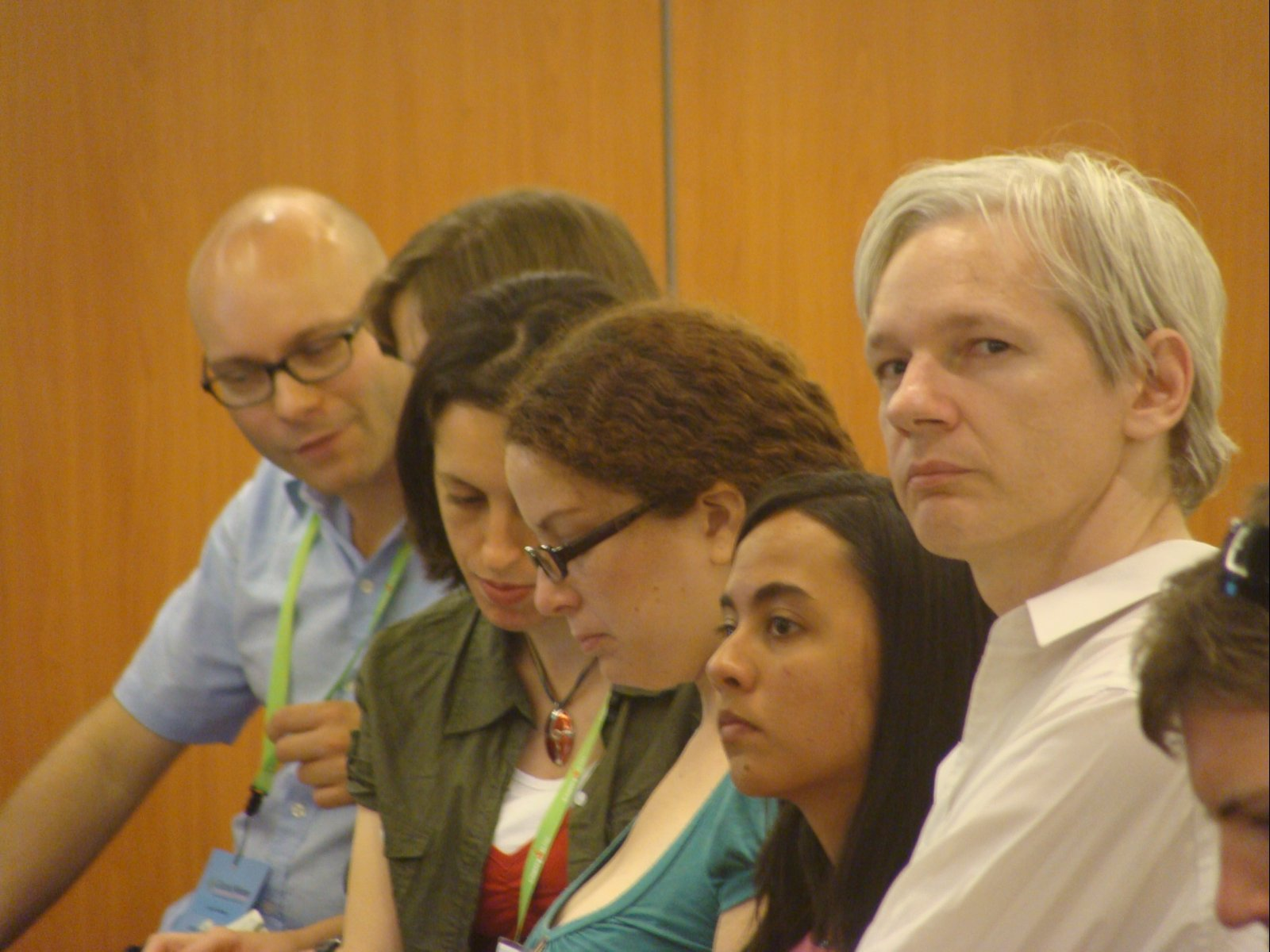
Assange in Hungary. Global Voices Summit 2008

Assange found key supporters at the Chaos Computer Club conference in Berlin in December 2007, including Daniel Domscheit-Berg and Jacob Appelbaum and the Swedish hosting company PRQ.

During this period, Assange was WikiLeaks' editor-in-chief and one of four permanent staff. The organisation maintained a larger group of volunteers, and Assange relied upon networks of others with expertise. The organisation published internet censorship lists, leaks, and classified media from anonymous sources. The publications include revelations about drone strikes in Yemen, corruption across the Arab world, extrajudicial executions by Kenyan police, 2008 Tibetan unrest in China, and the "Petrogate" oil scandal in Peru. From its inception, the website had a significant impact on political news in a large number of countries and across a wide range of issues.

From its inception, WikiLeaks sought to engage with the established professional media. It had good relations with parts of the German and British press. A collaboration with the Sunday Times journalist Jon Swain on a report on political killings in Kenya led to increased public recognition of the WikiLeaks publication, and this collaboration won Assange the 2009 Amnesty International New Media Award. Six men with guns tried to attack the compound that he slept at in Kenya after the report was published; when the security team were alerted the attackers fled. The Kenya leak led to corruption being a major issue in the election that followed, which was marred by violence. According to Assange, "1,300 people were eventually killed, and 350,000 were displaced. That was a result of our leak. On the other hand, the Kenyan people had a right to that information and 40,000 children a year die of malaria in Kenya. And many more die of money being pulled out of Kenya, and as a result of the Kenyan shilling being debased". Reporters have discussed the moral dilemma involved in reporting the corruption in Kenya.

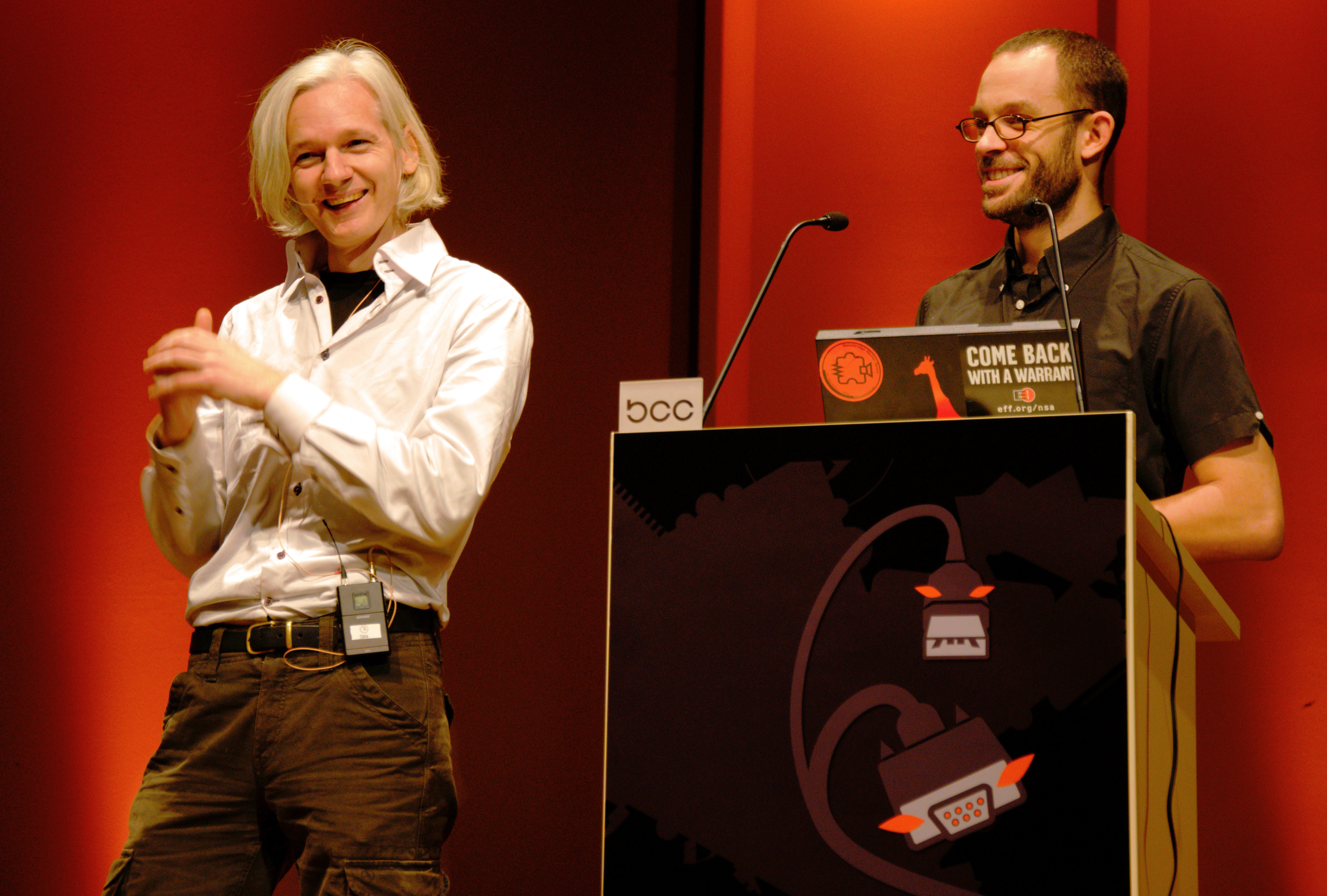
Assange and Daniel Domscheit-Berg at the 26C3 in Berlin, December 2009

WikiLeaks' international profile increased in 2008 when a Swiss bank, Bank Julius Baer, tried via a Californian court injunction to prevent the site's publication of bank records. Assange commented that financial institutions ordinarily "operate outside the rule of law", and he received extensive legal support from free-speech and civil rights groups. Bank Julius Baer's attempt to prevent the publication via injunction backfired. As a result of the Streisand effect, the publicity drew global attention to WikiLeaks and the bank documents.

By 2009 WikiLeaks had succeeded in Assange's intentions to expose the powerful, publish material beyond the control of states, and attract media support for its advocacy of freedom of speech, though not as much as he hoped; his goal of crowd-sourcing analysis of the documents was unsuccessful and few of the leaks attracted mainstream media attention.

In July 2009 Assange released through Wikileaks the full report of a commission of inquiry, set up by the British Foreign and Commonwealth Office, into corruption in the Turks and Caicos Islands. The report had been due for publication earlier in the year but an injunction obtained by some of those named had prevented its publication. According to Assange, the Commission released a redacted report and then removed it. WikiLeaks obtained and restored the full text. The report found that foreign property developers had given millions of US dollars in payments and secret loans to senior politicians in the islands, including the TCI's former premier, Michael Misick.

In September 2009 Assange published the Minton Report, a scientific report about the 2006 Ivory Coast toxic waste dump. Thirty‑thousand claimants were suing the oil firm Trafigura in London, in one of the largest class-action suits brought before a British court, after the firm had illegally exported toxic waste and then had it dumped in Abidjan in Ivory Coast. When the Guardian newspaper had asked the company about the report, it responded by having its law firm Carter‑Ruck obtain a super-injunction (in RJW v Guardian News and Media Ltd) to prevent discussion by the media of either the contents of the report or the existence of the injunction. After publication on WikiLeaks of the document itself, Assange published two editorials about the situation:

Assange argued that the secret gag order "remains in effect, and entirely prevents the reporting of the report's contents"....Assange said that because of the damaging threat of legal costs, UK newspapers had silently removed some of the original dumping investigations from their databases. "For example, the Independent's 'Toxic shame: thousands injured in African city' no-longer 'exists' except at WikiLeaks"

Wikileaks maintained the report on its site and linked to it on the social network Twitter, where they encouraged journalists to break the injunction's censorship. After a question was tabled about the report in the House of Commons under parliamentary privilege, Trafigura's law firm Carter‑Ruck claimed the injunction was sub judice and tried to prevent discussion of the affair in parliament itself. The publicity generated about the easy availability of the report on the Wikileaks website, and subsequently its publication by the Norwegian broadcaster NRK, led Carter-Ruck to agree to a modification of the injunction. The affair caused a furore and prompted a wider discussion in the British press about the continued use of super-injunctions.

As Wikileaks' editor, Assange commented on super-injunctions to the publishing industry news service Journalism.co.uk: "In 2008, the paper was served with six. In 2007, five. Haven't heard of these? Of course not, these are secret gag orders; the UK press has given up counting regular injunctions".

=== Manning leaks ===
The Cablegate as well as Iraq and Afghan War releases had an effect on diplomacy and public opinion globally, with responses varying by region.

==== Collateral murder video ====
Gun camera footage of the airstrike of 12 July 2007 in Baghdad, showing the deaths of journalists Namir Noor-Eldeen and Saeed Chmagh by U.S. Army Apache helicopters ("Collateral Murder")

In April 2010 WikiLeaks released video footage of the 12 July 2007, Baghdad airstrike, that have been regarded by several debaters as evidence of war crimes committed by the U.S. military. The news agency Reuters had earlier requested the footage through a US Freedom of Information Act request, but the request was denied. Assange and others worked for a week to break the U.S. military's encryption of the video, which they titled Collateral Murder and which Assange first presented at the U.S. National Press Club. The video shows U.S. Army Apache helicopters killing 18 civilians in Baghdad, including Reuters journalists Namir Noor-Eldeen and his assistant Saeed Chmagh.

==== Iraq and Afghan War logs ====
WikiLeaks published the Afghan War logs in July 2010. It was described by The New York Times as "a six-year archive of classified military documents [that] offers an unvarnished and grim picture of the Afghan war". In October 2010 WikiLeaks published the Iraq War logs, a collection of 391,832 United States Army field reports from the Iraq War covering from 2004 to 2009. Assange said that he hoped the publication would "correct some of that attack on the truth that occurred before the war, during the war, and which has continued after the war".

Regarding his own role within WikiLeaks, Assange said, "We always expect tremendous criticism. It is my role to be the lightning rod... to attract the attacks against the organization for our work, and that is a difficult role. On the other hand, I get undue credit." Assange travelled often and tried to stay away from Western intelligence agencies by checking into hotels under false names, sleeping on sofas and floors, and using encrypted phones and cash.

According to David Leigh and Luke Harding they had to persuade Assange to redact the names of Afghan informants, expressing their fear that they could be killed if exposed. In their book WikiLeaks: Inside Julian Assange's War on Secrecy they say Declan Walsh heard Assange say at a dinner when asked about redaction "Well, they're informants, so if they get killed, they've got it coming to them. They deserve it."

Assange denies making this statement; speaking on PBS Frontline about the accusations he said "It is absolutely right to name names. It is not necessarily right to name every name." John Goetz of Der Spiegel, who was also at the dinner, says that Assange did not make such a statement.

==== Release of US diplomatic cables ====
In November 2010 WikiLeaks published a quarter of a million U.S. diplomatic cables, known as the "Cablegate" files. WikiLeaks initially worked with established Western media organisations, and later with smaller regional media organisations while also publishing the cables upon which their reporting was based. Assange told a media partner that he owned the information and had a financial interest in how it was released. The files show United States espionage against the United Nations and other world leaders, revealed tensions between the U.S. and its allies, and exposed corruption in countries throughout the world as documented by U.S. diplomats, helping to spark the Arab Spring.

In March 2010 a member of WikiLeaks using the handle "Ox", widely believed to be Julian Assange, talked to Chelsea Manning by text chat while she was submitting leaks to WikiLeaks. The US referred to these chat logs in the 2018 indictment of Julian Assange and filed an affidavit which said they were able to identify Assange as the person chatting with Manning using hints he made during the chats and that Manning identified him as Assange to Adrian Lamo.

In the chat logs, Manning asks if he was "any good at LM hash cracking", which would decrypt passwords. Assange said he was, and told Manning about rainbow tables that WikiLeaks used to crack hashes and find passwords associated with them. An affidavit by an FBI agent involved in bringing the case against Assange claimed this showed an "illegal agreement" to help crack a password. When Manning told Assange she had nothing else to submit to WikiLeaks, he replied that "curious eyes never run dry in my experience."

During her court martial, Manning said she downloaded the detainee assessment briefs (DABs) for Guantanamo Bay after speaking to a member of Wikileaks via a secure online chat log. While discussing files on Guantanamo Bay, Manning asked Assange about detainee assessment briefs. She said that "although he did not believe that they were of political significance, he did believe that they could be used to merge into the general historical account of what occurred at Guantanamo." She added that "after this discussion, I decided to download the data."

===== Release of unredacted cables =====
In 2011 a series of events compromised the security of a WikiLeaks file containing the leaked US diplomatic cables. In August 2010, Assange gave Guardian journalist David Leigh an encryption key and a URL where he could locate the full file. In February 2011 David Leigh and Luke Harding of The Guardian published the encryption key in their book WikiLeaks: Inside Julian Assange's War on Secrecy. Leigh said he believed the key was a temporary one that would expire within days. WikiLeaks supporters disseminated the encrypted files to mirror sites in December 2010 after WikiLeaks experienced cyber-attacks. When WikiLeaks learned what had happened it notified the US State Department. On 25 August 2011, the German magazine Der Freitag published an article giving details which enabled people to piece the information together. On 1 September 2011, WikiLeaks announced they would make the unredacted cables public and searchable.

The Guardian wrote that the decision to publish the cables was made by Assange alone, a decision that it and its four previous media partners condemned. Glenn Greenwald wrote that "WikiLeaks decided—quite reasonably—that the best and safest course was to release all the cables in full, so that not only the world's intelligence agencies but everyone had them, so that steps could be taken to protect the sources and so that the information in them was equally available".

The US established an Information Review Task Force (IRTF) to investigate the impact of WikiLeaks' publications. It involved as many as 125 people working over 10 months. According to IRTF reports, the leaks could cause "serious damage" and put foreign US sources at risk. The head of the IRTF, Brigadier General Robert Carr, testified under questioning at Chelsea Manning's sentencing hearing that the task force had found no examples of anyone who had lost their life due to WikiLeaks' publication of the documents. Ed Pilkington wrote in The Guardian that Carr's testimony significantly undermined the argument that WikiLeaks' publications put lives at risk. At one of Assange's extradition hearings in 2020, a lawyer for the US said that "sources, whose redacted names and other identifying information was contained in classified documents published by WikiLeaks, who subsequently disappeared, although the US can't prove at this point that their disappearance was the result of being outed by WikiLeaks." The US Justice Department conceded that it had not identified anyone harmed as a result of the disclosures in the agreement submitted to the court prior to his release.

The US cited the release in the opening of its request for extradition of Assange, saying his actions put lives at risk. John Young, the owner and operator of the website Cryptome, testified at Assange's extradition hearing that the unredacted cables were published by Cryptome on 1 September, the day before WikiLeaks, and they remain on the Cryptome site. Lawyers for Assange gave evidence it said would show that Assange was careful to protect lives.

=== Later activities ===
In December 2010 PostFinance said it was closing Assange's Swiss bank account because he "provided false information regarding his place of residence during the account opening process" but that there would be "no criminal consequences" for misleading authorities. WikiLeaks said the account was used to "donate directly to the Julian Assange and other WikiLeaks Staff Defence Fund" and said the closing was part of a banking blockade against WikiLeaks.

According to the Associated Press, leaked documents from WikiLeaks include an unsigned letter from Julian Assange authorising Israel Shamir to seek a Russian visa on his behalf in 2010. WikiLeaks said Assange never applied for the visa or wrote the letter. According to The New York Times, in November 2010 "Assange had mused about seeking refuge in Russia", and Russia issued Assange a visa in January 2011.

According to Andrew O'Hagan, during the 2011 Egyptian revolution when Mubarak tried to close the mobile phone networks, Assange and others at WikiLeaks "hacked into Nortel and fought against Mubarak's official hackers to reverse the process".

Over the next several years, WikiLeaks published the Guantanamo Bay files leak, the Syria Files, the Kissinger cables, and the Saudi cables. As of July 2015, Assange said WikiLeaks had published more than ten million documents and associated analyses; he described it as "a giant library of the world's most persecuted documents".

== Legal issues ==
=== Swedish allegations of sexual offences ===
Beginning in 2010, Assange contested legal proceedings in the United Kingdom concerning his extradition, requested by Sweden, for a "preliminary investigation" into accusations of sexual offences made in August 2010. Assange left Sweden for the UK on 27 September 2010; an international arrest warrant was issued the same day. He was suspected of rape of a lesser degree, unlawful coercion and three instances of sexual molestation. In June 2012, Assange breached bail and sought refuge at Ecuador's Embassy in London and was granted asylum.

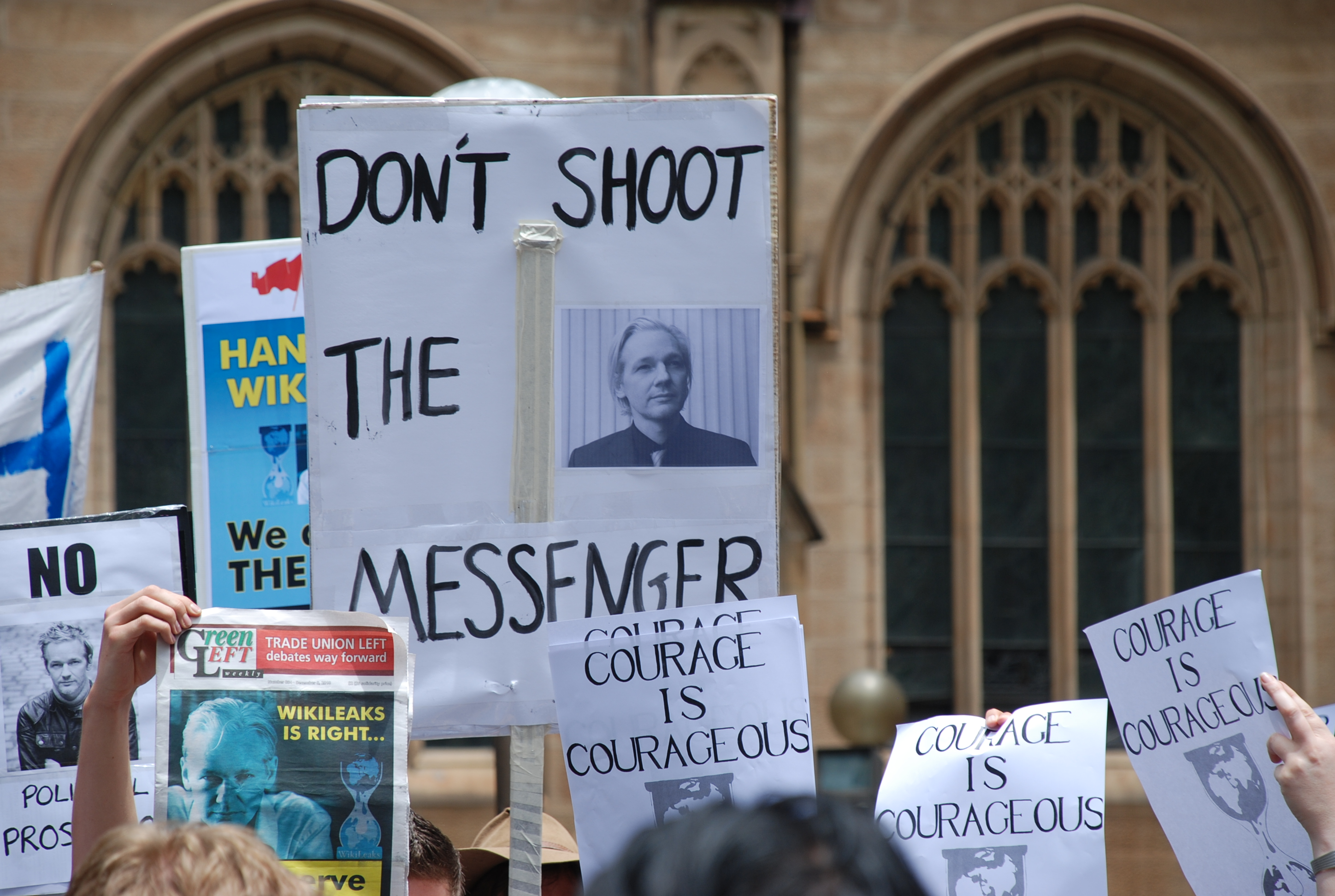
Demonstration in support of Assange in front of Sydney Town Hall, 10 December 2010

On 12 August 2015, Swedish prosecutors announced that the statute of limitations had expired for three of the allegations against Assange while he was in the Ecuadorian embassy. In 2017, the investigation into the rape allegation was dropped by Swedish authorities because of Assange's asylum in the Ecuadorian embassy. Assange said in these proceedings that he feared he would ultimately be extradited to the United States if he were sent to Sweden.

In May 2019, after Assange's extraction from the embassy, the Swedish Prosecution Authority reopened the investigation against Assange. The prosecutors expressed the intent to extradite Assange from the United Kingdom after he served his prison sentence for skipping bail. In June 2019, the Uppsala District Court denied a request to detain Assange, thereby preventing his extradition to Sweden.

On 19 November 2019 the prosecution dropped the case because "the evidence has weakened considerably due to the long period of time that has elapsed" although they stated they were confident in the complainants' evidence.

=== US criminal investigations ===
After WikiLeaks released the Manning material, United States authorities began investigating WikiLeaks and Assange to prosecute them under the Espionage Act of 1917. In November 2010, US Attorney-General Eric Holder said there was "an active, ongoing criminal investigation" into WikiLeaks. It emerged from legal documents leaked over the ensuing months that WikiLeaks was being investigated by a federal grand jury in Alexandria, Virginia and the administration urged allies to open criminal investigations of Assange.

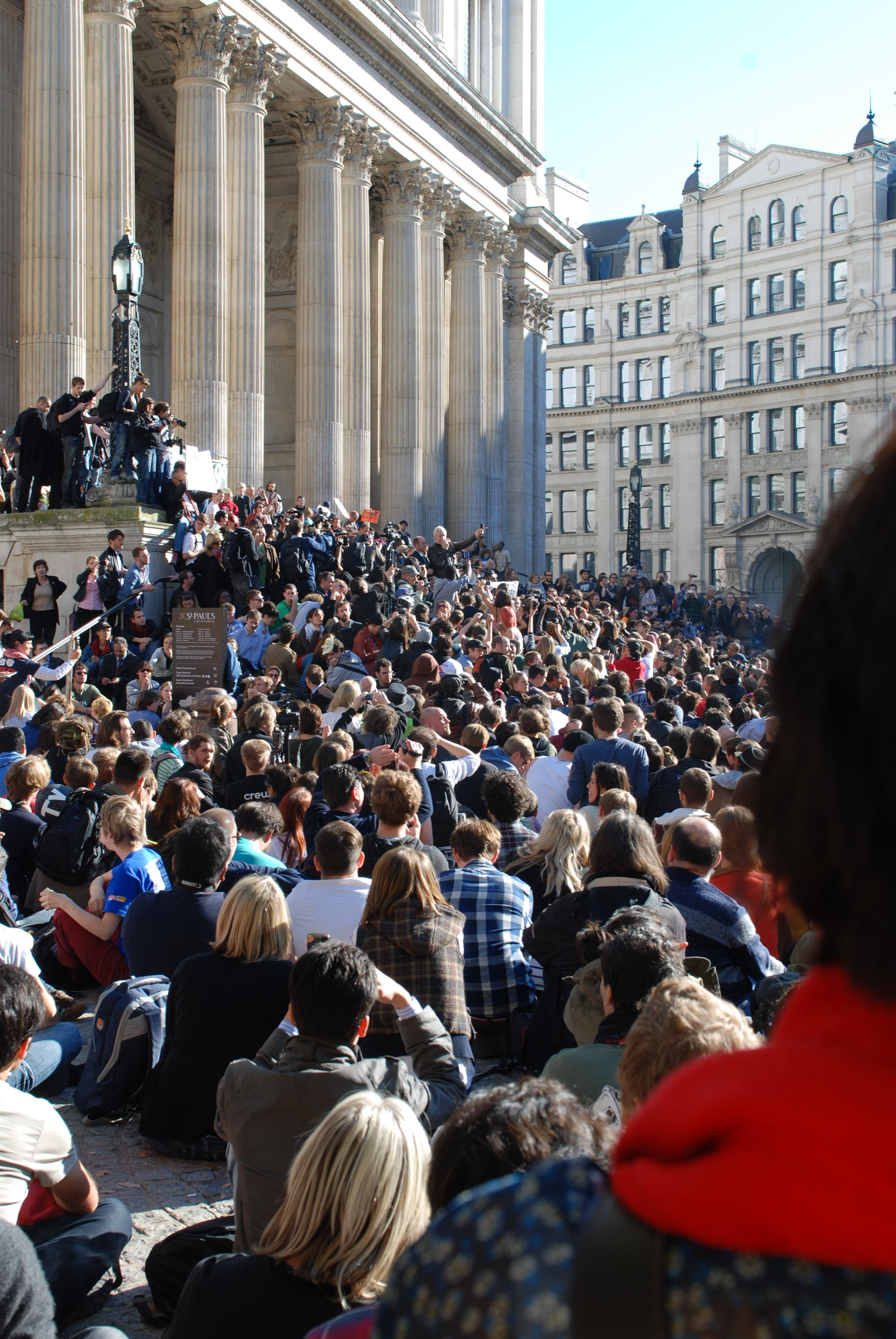
Assange speaks on the steps of St Paul's Cathedral in London, 16 October 2011.

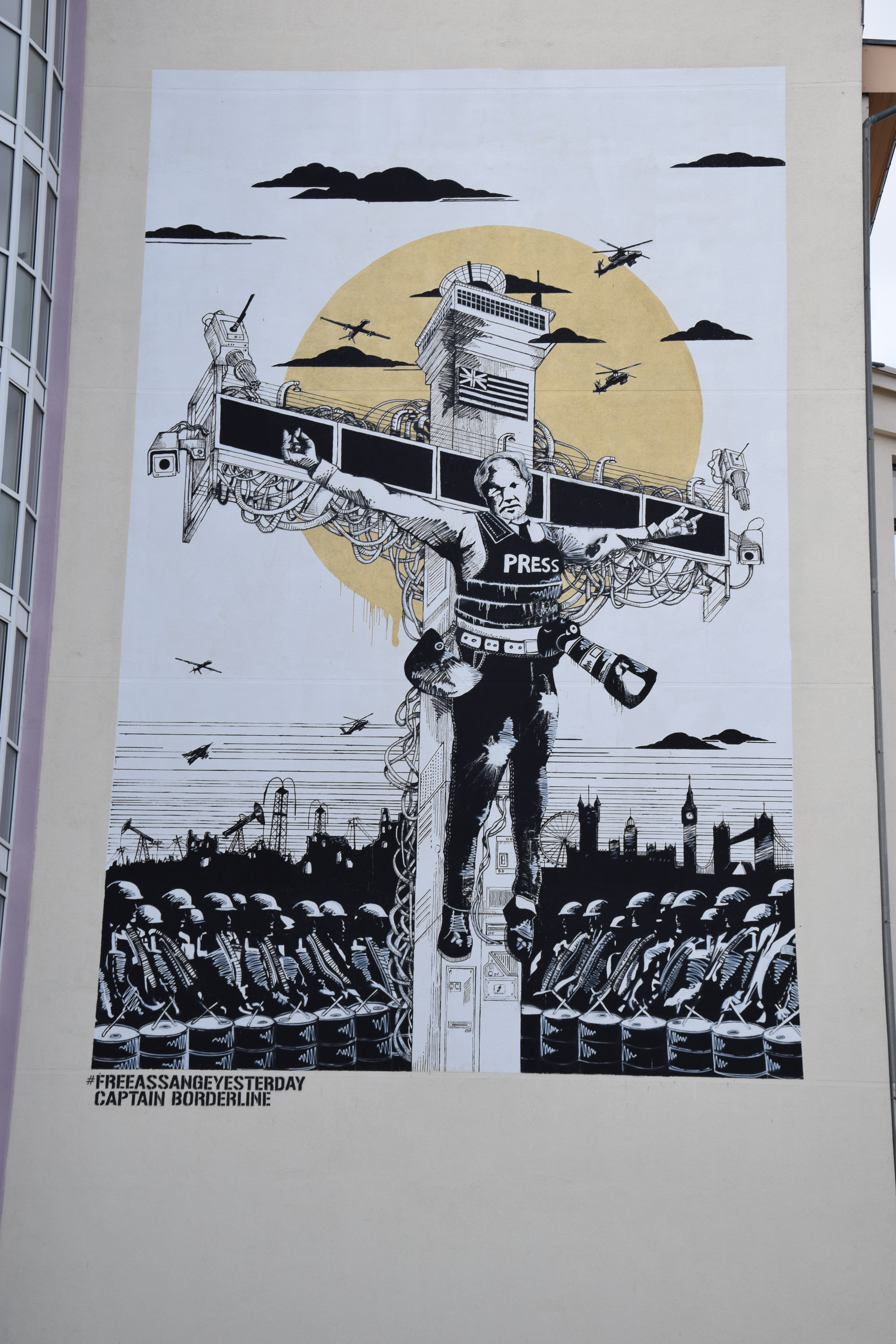
Mural Collateral Crucifixion (FreeAssangeYesterday) at Stresemannstraße 15 in Berlin Kreuzberg, created by the artist duo Captain Borderline

In 2010, the FBI told a lawyer for Assange that he was not the subject of an investigation. That year the NSA added Assange to its Manhunting Timeline, an annual account of efforts to capture or kill alleged terrorists and others. In 2011, the NSA discussed categorising WikiLeaks as a "malicious foreign actor" for surveillance purposes. In August 2011, WikiLeaks volunteer Sigurdur Thordarson contacted the FBI and became the first informant to work for the FBI from inside WikiLeaks. He gave the FBI several hard drives he had copied from Assange and core WikiLeaks members.

In December 2011 prosecutors in the Chelsea Manning case revealed the existence of chat logs between Manning and someone they claimed was Assange. Assange said that WikiLeaks has no way of knowing the identity of its sources and that chats with sources, including user-names, were anonymous. In January 2011, Assange described the allegation that WikiLeaks had conspired with Manning, had communicated with Manning, as "absolute nonsense" because WikiLeaks only learned Manning's name from media reports. The logs were presented as evidence during Manning's court-martial in June–July 2013. The prosecution argued that they showed WikiLeaks helping Manning reverse-engineer a password. During her trial, Manning said she acted on her own to send documents to WikiLeaks, and no one associated with WikiLeaks pressured her into giving more information.

In 2012 diplomatic cables between Australia and the United States were released that showed the US government was investigating Assange and that "a broad range of possible charges are under consideration, including espionage and conspiracy". The diplomats dismissed claims the investigation was politically motivated, and highlighted prosecutors' claims that Manning was "guided by WikiLeaks' list of 'most wanted' leaks".

In 2013 US officials said it was unlikely that the Justice Department would indict Assange for publishing classified documents because it would also have to prosecute the news organisations and writers who published classified material. In June 2013, The New York Times said that court and other documents suggested that Assange was being examined by a grand jury and "several government agencies", including by the FBI. Court documents published in May 2014 suggest that WikiLeaks was under "active and ongoing" investigation at that time.

Under the Obama Administration, the Department of Justice did not indict Assange because it could not find evidence that his actions differed from those of a journalist. During the first Trump Administration, CIA director Mike Pompeo and Attorney General Jeff Sessions stepped up pursuit of Assange. Law enforcement officials wanted to learn about Assange's knowledge of WikiLeaks's interactions with Russian intelligence and other actions. They had considered offering Assange some form of immunity from prosecution in exchange for his testimony and had reached out to Assange's lawyers. The negotiations were ended by the Vault 7 disclosures.

In April 2017 US officials were preparing to file formal charges against Assange. Assange's indictment was unsealed in 2019 and expanded on later that year and in 2020. The legal scholar Steve Vladeck said that prosecutors likely accelerated the case in 2019 due to the impending statute of limitations on Assange's largest leaks.

In early 2019 the Mueller report wrote the Special Counsel's office considered charging WikiLeaks or Assange "as conspirators in the computer-intrusion conspiracy" and that there were "factual uncertainties" about the role that Assange may have played in the hacks or their distribution that were "the subject of ongoing investigations" by the US Attorney's Office.

=== Legal issues in Australia ===
On 2 September 2011 Australia's attorney general, Robert McClelland released a statement that the US diplomatic cables published by Wikileaks had identified at least one ASIO officer, which was a crime in Australia. According to The Guardian and Al Jazeera, this meant Assange could face prosecution in Australia.

In 2014 WikiLeaks published information about political bribery allegations in Australia, violating a suppression order and meaning Assange could be charged if he returned to Australia.

== Ecuadorian embassy period ==
=== Entering the embassy ===
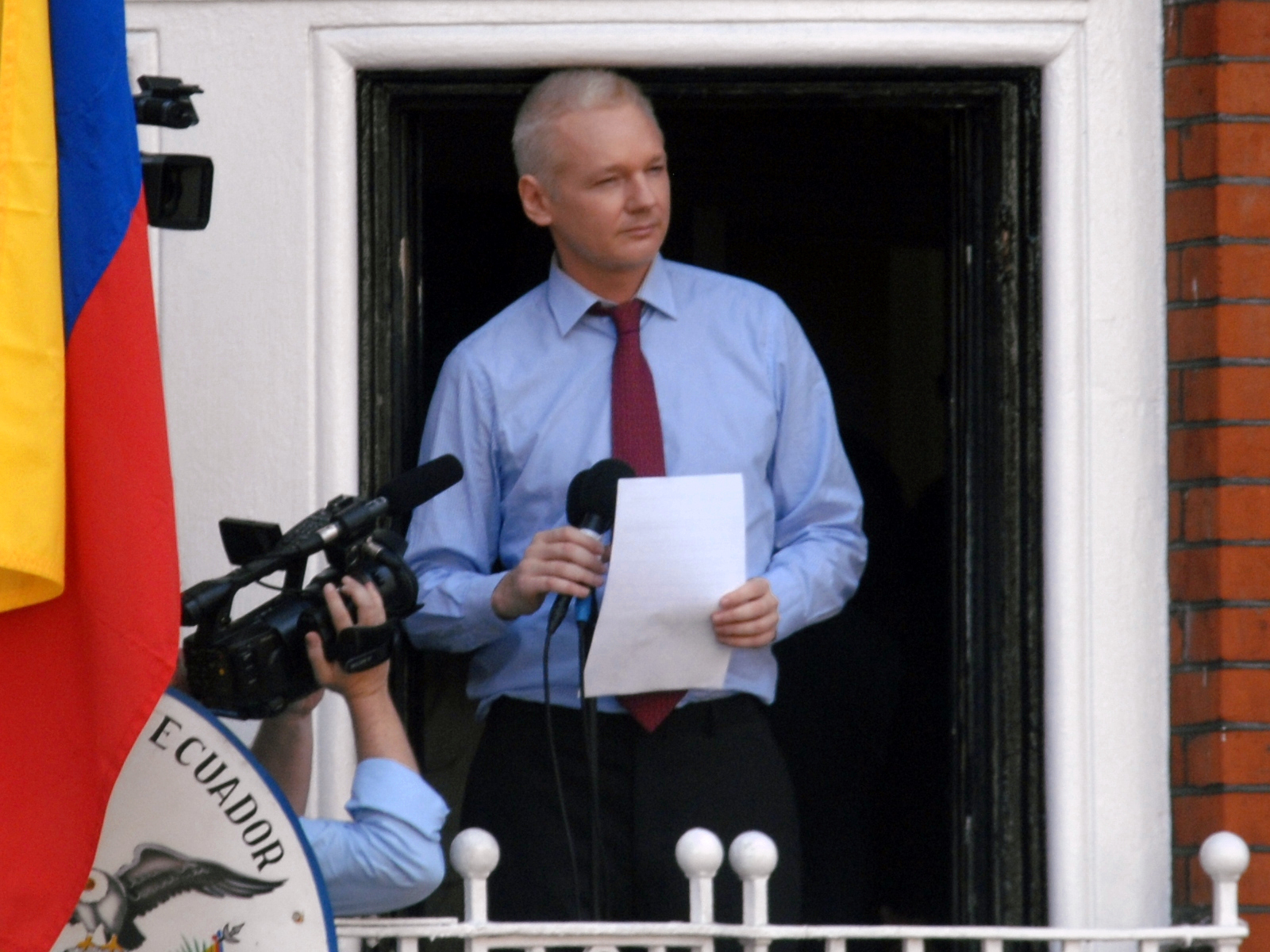
Assange on the balcony of the Ecuadorian embassy in London in 2012

On 19 June 2012 the Ecuadorian foreign minister, Ricardo Patiño, announced that Assange had applied for political asylum, that the Ecuadorian government was considering his request, and that Assange was at the Ecuadorian embassy in London. An office was converted into a studio apartment and equipped with a bed, telephone, sun lamp, computer, shower, treadmill, and kitchenette. The embassy removed the toilet in the women's bathroom at Assange's request so he could sleep. He was limited to roughly 30 square metres (320 sq ft) and ate a combination of takeaways and food prepared by the staff.

In justifying his move, Assange said Sweden had a "very, very poor judicial system", weakened by external political meddling, careerism, and a culture of "crazed radical feminist ideology". More importantly, the case was a matter of international politics. "Sweden is a U.S. satrapy", he said. Assange and his supporters said he was not concerned about any proceedings in Sweden as such but said that the Swedish allegations were designed to discredit him and were a pretext for his extradition from Sweden to the United States.

Assange breached his bail conditions by taking up residence in the embassy rather than appearing in court and faced arrest if he left. Assange's supporters, including journalist Jemima Goldsmith, forfeited £200,000 in bail and £40,000 as promised sureties. Goldsmith said she was surprised at his asylum bid and she wanted and expected him to face the Swedish allegations but added that he had "a real fear of being extradited to the US".

The UK government wrote to Patiño, saying that the police were entitled to enter the embassy and arrest Assange under UK law. Patiño said that this would be a violation of the Vienna Convention on Diplomatic Relations. Officers of the Metropolitan Police Service were stationed outside the embassy from June 2012 to October 2015 to arrest Assange if he left the embassy and compel him to attend the extradition appeal hearing. The police officers were withdrawn on grounds of cost in October 2015, but the police said they would still deploy "several overt and covert tactics to arrest him". The Metropolitan Police Service said the cost of the policing for the period was £12.6 million.

The Australian attorney-general, Nicola Roxon, wrote to Jennifer Robinson, a lawyer acting for Assange, saying that the Australian government would not seek to involve itself in any diplomacy about Assange. Prime Minister Julia Gillard said her government had no evidence the US intended to charge and extradite Assange at that time, and Roxon suggested that if Assange was imprisoned in the US, he could apply for an international prisoner transfer to Australia. Assange's lawyers described the letter as a "declaration of abandonment". WikiLeaks insiders stated that Assange decided to seek asylum because he felt abandoned by the Australian government.

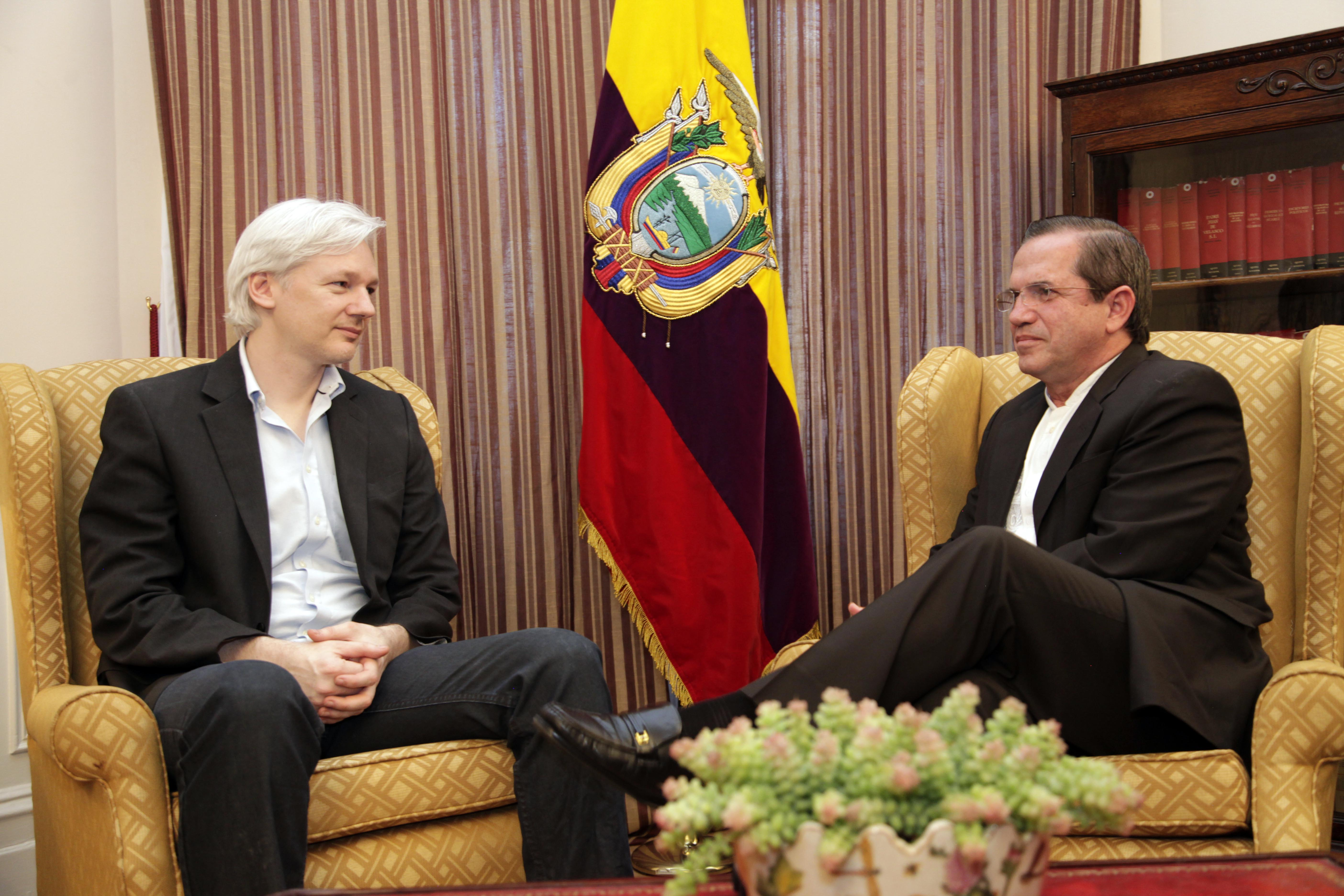
Ecuadorian foreign minister Ricardo Patiño met with Assange at the Ecuadorian Embassy on 16 June 2013.

On 16 August 2012 Patiño announced that Ecuador was granting Assange political asylum because of the threat represented by the United States secret investigation against him. In its formal statement, Ecuador said that "as a consequence of Assange's determined defense to freedom of expression and freedom of press... in any given moment, a situation may come where his life, safety or personal integrity will be in danger". Ecuadorian president Rafael Correa confirmed on 18 August that Assange could stay at the embassy indefinitely. Documents released that month showed that Australia had no objection to a potential extradition to the US, and a spokesman for Foreign Minister Bob Carr said that Assange refused an offer for consular assistance. In December, Assange said he felt freer in the embassy despite being more confined because he was the author of his own confinement.

=== Helping Edward Snowden ===
In 2013, Assange and others in WikiLeaks helped whistleblower Edward Snowden flee from US law enforcement. After the United States cancelled Snowden's passport, stranding him in Russia, Assange and others considered transporting him to South America on the presidential jet of a sympathetic South American leader. In order to throw the US off the scent, they spoke about the jet of the Bolivian president Evo Morales, instead of the jet they were considering. In July 2013, Morales's jet was forced to land in Austria after the US pressured Italy, France, and Spain to deny the jet access to their airspace over false rumours Snowden was on board. Assange said the grounding "reveals the true nature of the relationship between Western Europe and the United States" as "a phone call from U.S. intelligence was enough to close the airspace to a booked presidential flight, which has immunity". Assange advised Snowden that he would be safest in Russia which was better able to protect its borders than Venezuela, Brazil, or Ecuador. In 2015, Maria Luisa Ramos, the Bolivian ambassador to Russia, accused Assange of putting Morales' life at risk. Assange stated that he regretted what happened but that "[w]e can't predict that other countries engage in some ... unprecedented criminal operation".

=== Australian Senate bid and WikiLeaks Party ===
Assange stood for the Australian Senate in Victoria in the 2013 Australian federal election and launched the WikiLeaks Party, but he failed to win a seat. Assange said that Prime Minister Julia Gillard's attacks on WikiLeaks contributed to his decision to stand, and that if he won the seat he expected legal action against him in the US and the UK to end because of "the political costs". As the campaign progressed, the party experienced internal dissent over its governance and electoral tactics, with some members protesting about Assange's leadership.

After the 2013 election, Assange said that the WikiLeaks Party would continue and foreshadowed another tilt at the Senate. He tried to stand for the 2014 Australian Senate special election in Western Australia, but was ruled ineligible. The party was deregistered due to low membership numbers in 2015.

=== Campaigning for Kim Dotcom ===
Documents provided by Edward Snowden showed that in 2012 and 2013 the New Zealand government worked to establish a secret mass surveillance programme which it called "Operation Speargun". On 15 September 2014 while campaigning for Internet entrepreneur Kim Dotcom, Assange appeared via remote video link on his town hall meeting held in Auckland, which discussed the programme. Assange said the Snowden documents showed that he had been a target of the programme and that "Operation Speargun" represented "an extreme, bizarre, Orwellian future that is being constructed secretly in New Zealand".

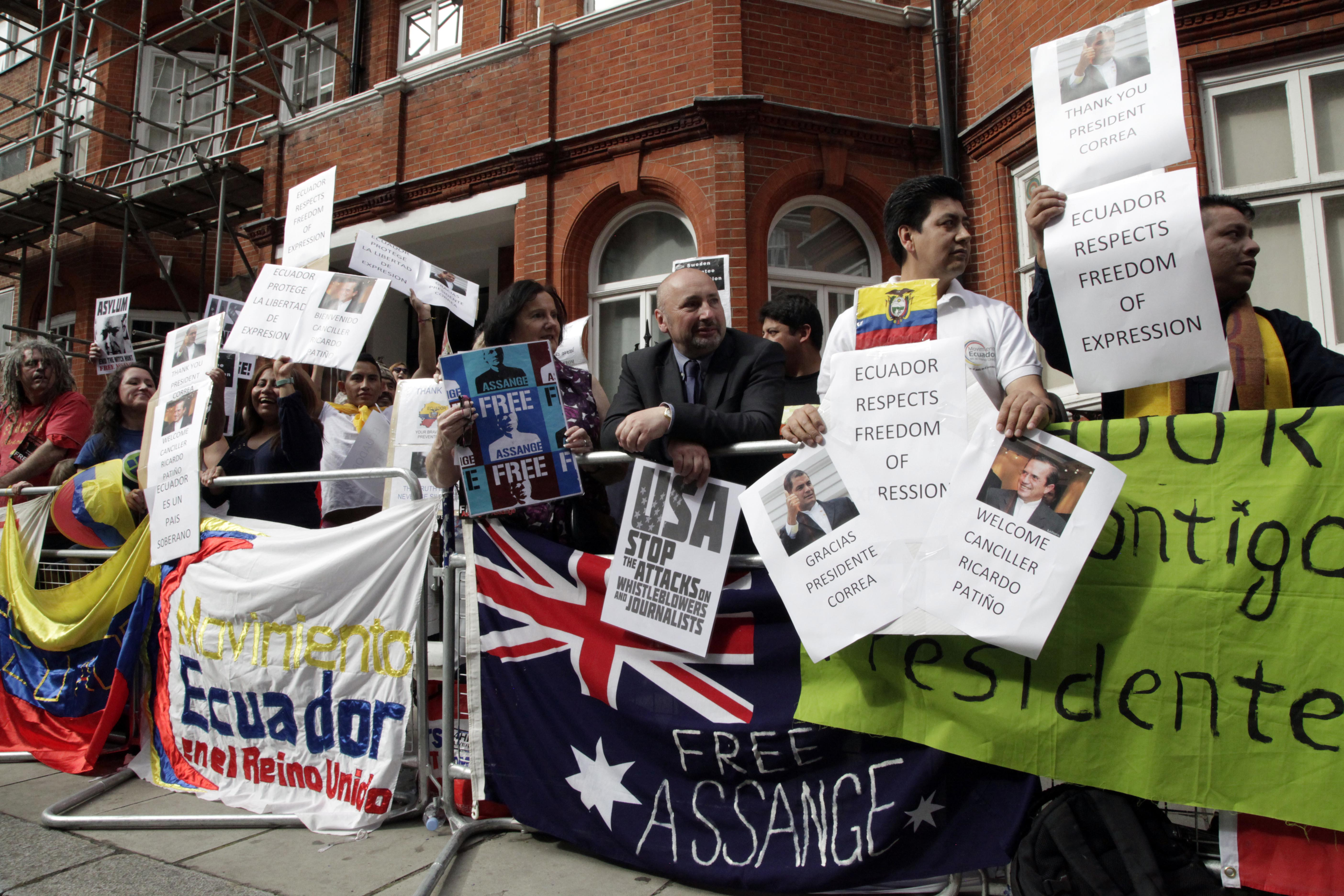
Demonstration outside the Ecuadorian embassy to free Assange, 16 June 2013

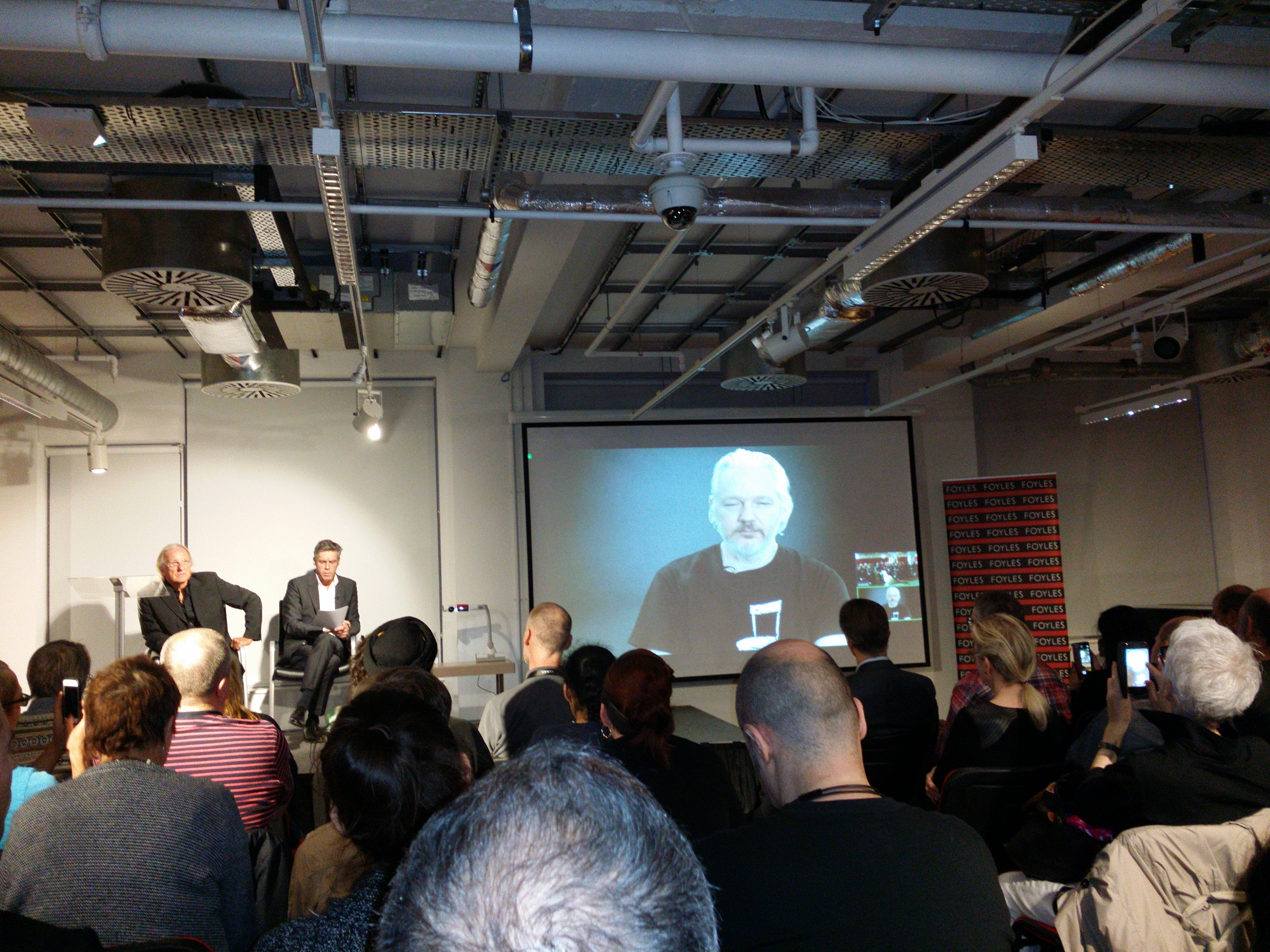
John Pilger, Richard Gizbert, and Assange–'The WikiLeaks Files' Book Launch–Foyles, London, 29 September 2015

=== Other developments ===
In 2014 the company hired to monitor Assange warned Ecuador's government that he was "intercepting and gathering information from the embassy and the people who worked there" and that he had compromised the embassy's communications system, which WikiLeaks called "an anonymous libel aligned with the current UK-US government onslaught against Mr Assange". According to El País, a November 2014 UC Global report said that a briefcase with a listening device was found in a room occupied by Assange. The UC Global report said that proved "the suspicion that he is listening in on diplomatic personnel, in this case against the ambassador and the people around him, in an effort to obtain privileged information that could be used to maintain his status in the embassy." Ambassador Falconí said Assange was evasive when asked about the briefcase.

On 3 July 2015 Paris newspaper Le Monde published an open letter from Assange to French president François Hollande in which Assange urged the French government to grant him refugee status. In response to this letter, Hollande said: "France cannot act on his request. The situation of Mr Assange does not present an immediate danger."

In September 2016 and again on 12 January 2017, WikiLeaks tweeted that if President Obama granted Chelsea Manning clemency, Assange would agree to US extradition. After commuting Manning's sentence on 17 January 2017, Obama stated that Assange's offer had not been a consideration and WikiLeaks tweeted that Assange was "still happy" to agree to extradition if his rights were respected despite Obama's statement. Assange said the decision to grant Manning clemency was an attempt to "make life hard" for Assange and make him look like a liar. One of WikiLeaks' lawyers, Melinda Taylor, said Assange would stand by the offer, and WikiLeaks tweets suggested he was ready for extradition and Assange said "I stand by everything I said including the offer to go to the United States if Chelsea Manning's sentence was commuted". Assange faced pressure to agree to extradition, but retreated from the offer. WikiLeaks lawyers Melinda Taylor and Barry Pollack said that the clemency did not meet Assange's conditions and Manning should have been released immediately.

On 19 May 2017 Assange emerged on the embassy's balcony and told a crowd that, despite no longer facing a Swedish sex investigation, he would remain inside the embassy to avoid extradition to the United States.

He received several visitors during his stay, among them Pamela Anderson who wrote:

I visited Julian regularly at the Ecuadorian embassy in London, staying for hours at a time. He looked forward to the vegan meals I'd bring him, and he was intrigued by my perspective on global issues. Most of his visitors were lawyers, politicians and people he worked with closely on legal matters. My presence was different, maybe, a little refreshing, human. Somewhat stimulating for him.

— Book excerpt

=== 2016 US presidential election ===
In February 2016 Assange wrote: "Hillary lacks judgment and will push the United States into endless, stupid wars which spread terrorism ... she certainly should not become president of the United States." Before the election, WikiLeaks was approached by Cambridge Analytica CEO Alexander Nix about releasing missing Clinton emails. Assange rejected the request and the Daily Beast reported that he replied he preferred to do the work on his own. In an Election Day statement, Assange said that "The Democratic and Republican candidates have both expressed hostility towards whistleblowers".

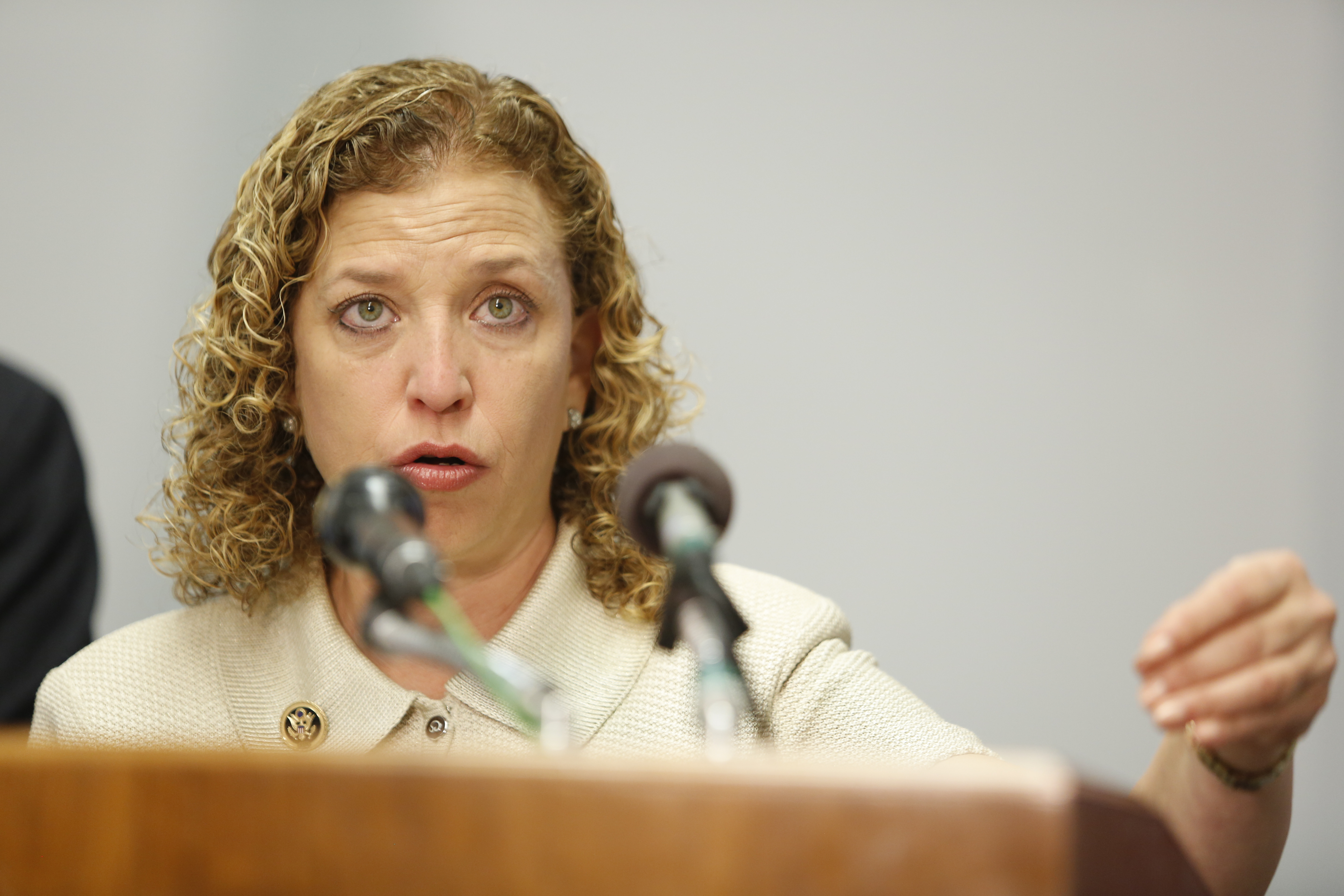
Debbie Wasserman Schultz resigned as DNC chairwoman following WikiLeaks releases suggesting bias against Bernie Sanders.

On 22 July 2016, WikiLeaks released emails and documents from the Democratic National Committee (DNC), in which the DNC presented ways of undercutting Clinton's competitor Bernie Sanders and showed favouritism towards Clinton. The release led to the resignation of DNC chairwoman Debbie Wasserman Schultz and an apology to Sanders from the DNC. The New York Times wrote that Assange had timed the release to coincide with the 2016 Democratic National Convention because he believed Clinton had pushed for his indictment and he regarded her as a "liberal war hawk".

On 7 October, WikiLeaks began publishing emails from Clinton campaign chairman John Podesta. On 15 October, the Ecuadorian government severed Assange's Internet connection until December because of election interference. According to surveillance reports of Assange provided by UC Global, on 19 October, associates of Assange removed boxes covered with blankets and about 100 hard drives from the embassy.

In November 2016, WikiLeaks asked Donald Trump Jr. to share a WikiLeaks tweet with the made-up quote "Can't we just drone this guy?" which the website True Pundit claimed that Hillary Clinton had made about Assange. After the election, WikiLeaks and Assange requested that the president-elect Donald Trump push Australia to appoint Assange as ambassador to the US.

Cybersecurity experts attributed the attack on the DNC server to the Russian government and 12 Russian GRU military intelligence agents were later indicted for the attack. The Senate Intelligence Committee reported that "WikiLeaks actively sought, and played, a key role in the Russian intelligence campaign and very likely knew it was assisting a Russian intelligence influence effort." According to the Mueller report, the Russian campaign shared these emails using the pseudonym Guccifer 2.0 with WikiLeaks and other entities. The investigation also unearthed communications between Guccifer 2.0 and WikiLeaks in which they talked about the release of the material. When asked about Guccifer 2.0's leaks, Assange said, "These look very much like they're from the Russians. But in some ways, they look very amateur, and almost look too much like the Russians."

In interviews, Assange repeatedly said that the Russian government was not the source of the DNC and Podesta emails, and accused the Clinton campaign of "a kind of neo-McCarthy hysteria" about Russian involvement. On the eve of the election, Assange addressed the criticism he had received for publishing Clinton material, saying that WikiLeaks publishes original "material given to us if it is of political, diplomatic, historical or ethical importance" and that it had never received any original information on Trump, Jill Stein, or Gary Johnson's campaign. Assange hinted that DNC staffer Seth Rich was the source of the DNC emails and that Rich had been killed as a result.

=== Later years in the embassy ===
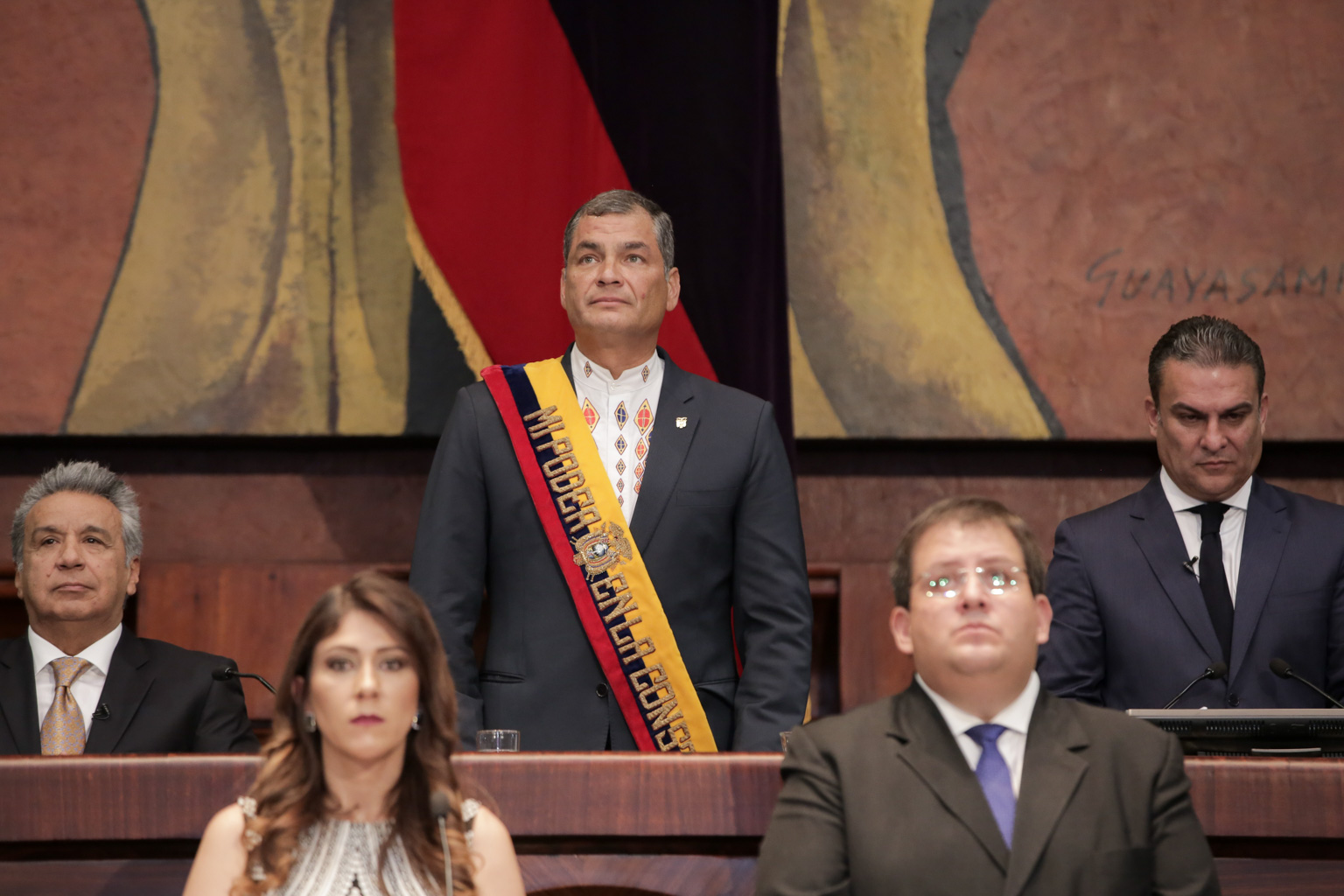
Rafael Correa, who was openly sympathetic to Assange, served as President of Ecuador from 2007 to 2017.

In March 2017, WikiLeaks began releasing the largest leak of CIA documents in history, codenamed Vault 7. The documents included details of the CIA's hacking capabilities and software tools used to break into smartphones, computers and other Internet-connected devices. In April, CIA director Mike Pompeo called WikiLeaks "a non-state hostile intelligence service often abetted by state actors like Russia". Assange responded "The head of the CIA determining who is a publisher, who's not a publisher, who's a journalist, who's not a journalist, is totally out of line". According to former intelligence officials, in the wake of the Vault 7 leaks, the CIA talked about kidnapping Assange from Ecuador's London embassy, and some senior officials discussed his potential assassination. Yahoo! News found "no indication that the most extreme measures targeting Assange were ever approved." Some of its sources said that they had alerted House and Senate intelligence committees to the plans that Pompeo and others was suggesting. In October 2021, Assange's lawyers introduced the alleged plot during a hearing of the High Court of Justice in London as it considered the U.S. appeal of a lower court's ruling that Assange could not be extradited to face charges in the U.S. In 2022 the Spanish courts summoned Pompeo as a witness to testify on the alleged plans.

On 6 June 2017 Assange supported NSA leaker Reality Winner, who had been arrested three days earlier, by tweeting "Acts of non-elite sources communicating knowledge should be strongly encouraged". On 16 August 2017, US Republican congressman Dana Rohrabacher visited Assange and told him that Trump would pardon him on condition that he would agree to say that Russia was not involved in the 2016 Democratic National Committee email leaks. At his extradition hearings in 2020, Assange's defence team alleged in court that this offer was made "on instructions from the president". Trump and Rohrabacher subsequently said they had never spoken about the offer and Rohrabacher said he had made the offer on his own initiative.

In late August 2017 Assange became involved in the Catalonia independence movement. Assange was seen as the movement's chief international spokesman and according to an independent analysis confirmed by Fairfax Media, he was responsible for more than 25% of all Twitter traffic under the hashtag #Catalonia before the 2017 Catalan independence referendum. Assange disseminated messages and disinformation supporting the movement and he was forced to delete several fake or misleading images he had shared on Twitter. Some of his statements in tweets and radio interviews on Catalonia confused people with each other or fictional characters, and others made distorted or exaggerated claims. In September, Assange offered a reward for information on the use of Spanish security forces during the referendum. In November 2017, Assange met with two key supporters of the independence movement, Oriol Soler and Arnau Grinyó, which caused backlash from the Spanish government. The Spanish government said that Assange was spreading information that was "at odds with reality" and the Ecuadorian government warned Assange against commenting on other countries' policies.

In December 2017 Spanish foreign minister Alfonso Dastis said Assange was "trying to interfere and manipulate" in the situation in Catalonia. Assange stated that, while he did not have a position on the outcome of the Catalan independence referendum, he believed that Catalans had the right to self-determination. In the lead up to the referendum, he provided Catalans instructions on how to communicate and organise through secure channels and disseminated historical background on the Catalan independence movement. When the Spanish Government disabled voting apps, Assange tweeted instructions on how Catalans could use other apps to find out information about voting. Assange's actions upset the Spanish government, leading to concerns in Ecuador, which soon after cut off Assange's internet and stopped his access to visitors. In January 2020, the Catalan Dignity Commission awarded Assange its 2019 Dignity Prize for "his efforts to correct misreporting of events and to provide live video updates to the world of the peaceful Catalan protesters and the brutal crackdown on them by Spanish police".

In December 2017, Ecuador granted Assange citizenship and approved a "special designation in favor of Mr. Julian Assange so that he can carry out functions at the Ecuadorean Embassy in Russia" with a monthly salary of $2,000. On 21 December, Britain's Foreign Office wrote that it did not recognise Assange as a diplomat, and that he did not have "any type of privileges and immunities under the Vienna Convention." The citizenship was revoked in July 2021 over unpaid fees and problems in the naturalisation papers, which allegedly had several inconsistencies, different signatures, and the possible alteration of documents. Assange's lawyer said the decision had been made without due process, but Ecuador's Foreign Ministry said the Pichincha Court for Contentious Administrative Matters had "acted independently and followed due process in a case that took place during the previous government and that was raised by the same previous government."

In January 2018 Sean Hannity's Twitter account was temporarily deleted and Assange sent messages to an account impersonating the Fox News host offering "news" on Mark Warner, a senior Democrat senator investigating Trump-Russia links. Assange asked the fake Hannity to contact him about it on "other channels". In February 2018, after Sweden had suspended its investigation, Assange brought two legal actions, arguing that Britain should drop its arrest warrant for him as it was "no longer right or proportionate to pursue him" and the arrest warrant for breaching bail had lost its "purpose and its function". In both cases, Senior District Judge Emma Arbuthnot ruled that the arrest warrant should remain in place.

In March 2018 Assange used social media to criticise Germany's arrest of Catalonian separatist leader Carles Puigdemont. He also tweeted that Britain was about to conduct a propaganda war against Russia relating to the poisoning of Sergei and Yulia Skripal. On 28 March 2018, Ecuador responded by cutting Assange's internet connection. Ecuador said he had broken a commitment "not to issue messages that might interfere with other states" and Assange said he was "exercising his right to free speech". In May 2018, The Guardian reported that Ecuador devised plans to help Assange escape should British police forcibly enter the embassy to seize him. In July 2018, President Moreno said that he was talking to the British government about how to end Assange's asylum and guarantee his life would be safe.

On 11 October 2018 Ecuador partially restored his communications. On 16 October 2018, members of Congress from the United States House Committee on Foreign Affairs wrote an open letter to President Moreno, which described Assange as a dangerous criminal. It stated that progress between the US and Ecuador in economic cooperation, counter-narcotics assistance, and the return of a USAID mission to Ecuador depended on Assange being handed over to the authorities.

On 19 October 2018 Assange sued the government of Ecuador for violating his "fundamental rights and freedoms" by threatening to remove his protection and cut off his access to the outside world, refusing him visits from journalists and human rights organisations and installing signal jammers to prevent phone calls and internet access. An Ecuadorian judge ruled against him, saying that requiring Assange to pay for his Internet use and clean up after his cat did not violate his right to asylum.

On 21 December 2018 the UN's Working Group on Arbitrary Detention urged the UK to let Assange leave the embassy freely. In February 2019, the parliament of Geneva passed a motion demanding that the Swiss government extend asylum to Assange. In March 2019, the Inter-American Commission on Human Rights rejected a complaint submitted by Assange asking the Ecuadorian government to "ease the conditions that it had imposed on his residence" at the embassy and to protect him from extradition to the US. It also requested US prosecutors unseal criminal charges that had been filed against him. The commission rejected his complaint.

=== Surveillance of Assange in the embassy ===
After Julian Assange was granted asylum and entered the Ecuadorian embassy in London, new CCTV cameras were installed. The Ecuadorian security service hired UC Global to provide security for the embassy. Without the knowledge of the Ecuadorian security service, employees of UC Global made detailed recordings of Assange's daily activities, interactions with embassy staff, and visits from his legal team and others. New cameras with microphones were installed in December 2017, and the installation of microphones in fire extinguishers and the women's bathroom was ordered. Other microphones were installed in decorations in the embassy. UC Global's director arranged for the United States Central Intelligence Agency to have immediate access to the recordings. The embassy staff had removed the toilet in the women's bathroom in June 2012 at Assange's request so he could sleep in the quiet room, which he also used to meet with his lawyers.

Then Ecuadorian ambassador to the UK, Juan Falconí Puig, was unaware of the operation until a bill went to the embassy in May 2015 and then Ecuadorian foreign minister Ricardo Patiño had to explain the situation to the ambassador. According to David Morales, the surveillance was also ordered by the former Ecuadorian ambassador in London, Carlos Abad.

On 20 June 2019 El Pais revealed the existence of the surveillance recordings and reports about Assange by UC Global. On 7 August 2019, Spain's High Court opened proceedings inquiring about the surveillance of Assange after he filed a complaint that accused UC Global of violating his privacy and client-attorney privileges as well as committing misappropriation, bribery and money laundering.

According to testimony by former employees, the material on Assange was handed over to the CIA by a member of the security service of Sheldon Adelson, the owner of the Las Vegas Sands. According to court papers seen by the Associated Press, it was alleged that Morales had passed the recordings to Zohar Lahav, described by Assange's lawyers as a security officer at Las Vegas Sands. In 2022, four associates of Assange filed a lawsuit against the CIA alleging their civil rights were violated when they were recorded as part of the surveillance of Assange. In a December 2023 ruling allowing the lawsuit to proceed and rejecting a CIA motion to dismiss, the judge trimmed the scope of the suit by rejecting some portions.

== Indictment and arrest ==
On 11 April 2019, Ecuador revoked Assange's asylum, and he was arrested by the London Metropolitan Police. At a hearing at Westminster Magistrates' Court a few hours later, Assange was found guilty of breaching the terms of his bail. On 1 May 2019 Assange was sentenced to 50 weeks imprisonment. The judge said he would be released after serving half of his sentence, subject to other proceedings and conditional upon committing no further offences.

Following his arrest, the US revealed a previously sealed 2018 US indictment in which Assange was charged with conspiracy to commit computer intrusion related to his involvement with Chelsea Manning and WikiLeaks.

On 23 May 2019 a US grand jury added 17 espionage charges also related to his involvement with Chelsea Manning, making a total of 18 federal charges against Assange in the US. On 25 June 2020 a new indictment was filed alleging that since 2009, Assange had attempted to recruit hackers and system administrators at conferences around the world and conspired with hackers including members of LulzSec and Anonymous. The new indictment described Assange's alleged efforts to recruit system administrators, Assange and WikiLeaks' role in helping Snowden flee the US, their use of Snowden as a recruitment tool, and WikiLeaks' exploiting a vulnerability in the United States Congress' system to access and publish the Congressional Research Service reports. Assange's defenders responded to U.S. accusations, describing him as a journalist who did nothing more than publish leaked information that embarrassed the U.S. government.

== Imprisonment in the UK ==
After his arrest, Assange was incarcerated at HM Prison Belmarsh in London. After visiting Assange in prison on 9 May 2019, Nils Melzer, the United Nations special rapporteur on Torture and Other Cruel, Inhuman or Degrading Treatment or Punishment, concluded that "in addition to physical ailments, Mr Assange showed all symptoms typical for prolonged exposure to psychological torture, including extreme stress, chronic anxiety and intense psychological trauma". The British government said it disagreed with some of his observations.

On 13 September 2019 District Judge Vanessa Baraitser ruled that Assange would not be released on 22 September when his prison term ended because he was a flight risk and his lawyers had not applied for bail. She said when his sentence came to an end, his status would change from a serving prisoner to a person facing extradition. On 1 November 2019 Melzer said that Assange's health had continued to deteriorate and his life was now at risk, adding that the UK government had not acted on the issue. On 30 December 2019, Melzer accused the UK government of torturing Assange. He said Assange's "continued exposure to severe mental and emotional suffering... clearly amounts to psychological torture or other cruel, inhuman or degrading treatment or punishment."

On 17 February 2020 Australian MPs Andrew Wilkie and George Christensen visited Assange and pressed the UK and Australian governments to intervene and stop him from being extradited. Between November 2019 and February 2020, concerns about Assange's health and the conditions of his detention were raised by members of the medical profession who signed petitions on his behalf.

On 25 March 2020 Assange was again denied bail after Judge Baraitser rejected his lawyers' argument that his imprisonment would put him at high risk of contracting COVID-19. She said Assange's past conduct showed how far he was willing to go to avoid extradition. Assange was confined to his cell for 23 hours per day and given one hour of recreation per day conducted inside. After a visit to Assange in December 2023, writer Charles Glass observed that Assange was “deathly” pale. Assange told Glass that he had accumulated 232 books while in Belmarsh.

== Hearings on extradition to the US ==
=== Magistrate's court ===
On 2 May 2019 the first hearing was held in London into the U.S. request for Assange's extradition. When asked by Judge Snow whether he consented to extradition, Assange replied, "I do not wish to surrender myself for extradition for doing journalism that has won many, many awards and protected many people". On 13 June, British home secretary Sajid Javid said he had signed the extradition order. Towards the end of 2019, Judge Emma Arbuthnot, who had presided at several of the extradition hearings, withdrew from the case for what she described as a "perception of bias" after reports about her family's connections to the intelligence services and defence industries. Vanessa Baraitser was appointed as the presiding judge.

On 21 October 2019 Assange appeared for a case management hearing at the court. When Judge Baraitser asked about his understanding of the proceedings, Assange replied:

I don't understand how this is equitable. This superpower had 10 years to prepare for this case and I can't access my writings. It's very difficult where I am to do anything but these people have unlimited resources. They are saying journalists and whistleblowers are enemies of the people. They have unfair advantages dealing with documents. They [know] the interior of my life with my psychologist.

In February 2020, the court heard legal arguments. Assange's lawyers contended that he had been charged with political offences and therefore could not be extradited. The hearings were delayed for months due to requests for extra time from the prosecution and the defence and due to the COVID-19 pandemic.

Assange appeared in court on 7 September 2020, facing the espionage indictment with 18 counts. Judge Baraitser denied motions by Assange's barristers to dismiss the new charges or to adjourn so they could better respond. During the hearing, Assange interrupted the US government's lawyer as he spoke during cross-examination of a witness, shouting, "This is nonsense!" Judge Baraitser warned Assange not to interrupt proceedings and said if he did so again he would be expelled from the courtroom.

Some witnesses who testified in September, such as Daniel Ellsberg, did so remotely via video link due to COVID-19 restrictions. Technical problems caused extensive delays. Torture victim Khaled el-Masri, who was originally requested as a defence witness, had his testimony reduced to a written statement. Other witnesses testified that the conditions of imprisonment, which would be likely to worsen upon extradition to the U.S., placed Assange at a high risk of depression and suicide which was exacerbated by his Asperger syndrome. During the court proceedings the defence drew attention to a prison service report stating that a hidden razor blade had been found by a prison officer during a search of Assange's cell. During the proceedings it was also revealed that Assange had contacted the Samaritans phone service on numerous occasions. A forensic psychiatrist for the prosecution said the risk of suicide was managed and that Assange had a "self-dramatising or hyperbolic approach in describing symptoms".

Patrick Eller, a former forensics examiner with the U.S. Army Criminal Investigation Command, testified that Assange did not crack and could not have cracked the password mentioned in the U.S. indictment, as Chelsea Manning had intentionally sent only a portion of the password's hash. Moreover, Eller stated that password cracking was a common topic of discussion among other soldiers stationed at Forward Operating Base Hammer, suggesting that Manning's message was unrelated to the classified documents which were already in her possession. Testimony on 30 September revealed new allegations surrounding the surveillance of the Ecuadorian embassy by UC Global. A former UC Global employee, who spoke anonymously, fearing reprisals, stated that the firm undertook "an increasingly sophisticated operation" after it was put into contact with the Trump administration by Sheldon Adelson. According to the employee, intelligence agents discussed plans to break into the embassy to kidnap or poison Assange and attempted to obtain the DNA of a baby who was believed to be Assange's child.

On 4 January 2021 Judge Baraitser ruled that Assange could not be extradited to the United States, citing concerns about his mental health and the risk of suicide in a US prison. She sided with the US on every other point, including whether the charges constituted political offences and whether he was entitled to freedom of speech protections.

=== Appeals and other developments ===
On 6 January 2021 Assange was again denied bail on the grounds that he was a flight risk, pending an appeal by the United States. The US prosecutors appealed against the denial of extradition on 15 January.

In July 2021 the Biden administration assured the Crown Prosecution Services that "Mr Assange will not be subject to Special administrative measures or imprisoned at ADX Florence (unless he were to do something subsequent to the offering of these assurances that meets the tests for the imposition of SAMs or designation to ADX)". The Biden administration also said that it would consent to Assange being transferred to Australia to serve any prison sentence. An Amnesty International expert on national security and human rights in Europe said, "Those are not assurances at all. It's not that difficult to look at those assurances and say: these are inherently unreliable, it promises to do something and then reserves the right to break the promise".

In June 2021 Icelandic newspaper Stundin published details of an interview with Sigurdur Ingi Thordarson, the key witness identified as "Teenager" in the U.S. Justice Department's case against Assange. In the interview Thordarson, who had received a promise of immunity from prosecution in return for co-operating with the FBI, stated he had fabricated allegations used in the U.S. indictment. The Washington Post said Thordarson's testimony was not used as the basis for charges but for information on Assange's contact with Chelsea Manning. A year previously The Washington Post said the superseding indictment broadened the case against Assange to that he was a hacker not a publisher and said evidence for that involved Thordarson.

In August 2021 in the High Court, Lord Justice Holroyde ruled that Judge Baraitser may have given too much weight to what Holroyde called "a misleading report" by an expert witness for the defence, psychiatrist Prof Michael Kopelman, and granted permission for the contested risk of suicide to be raised on the appeal.

In October 2021 the High Court held a two-day appeal hearing presided over by Ian Burnett, Baron Burnett of Maldon, Lord Chief Justice of England and Wales, and Lord Justice Holroyde. In opening the U.S. as appellant argued that Assange's health issues were less severe than claimed during the initial extradition hearing and that his depression was moderate rather than severe. They also drew attention to binding assurances given by the U.S. concerning his proposed treatment in custody and pointed to the lower rate of suicides in prisons in the U.S. compared to the UK. The lawyer also made four binding assurances concerning his proposed treatment in U.S. custody, including an agreement to send Assange to his home country of Australia to serve the prison sentence and not to incarcerate him in super-maximum security prison or solitary confinement. In response, Edward Fitzgerald QC drew attention to a Yahoo! News report that the CIA had plotted to poison, abduct or assassinate Assange. Fitzgerald argued that "there are great grounds for fearing what will be done to him" if extradited to the U.S. He urged the court "not to trust [the] assurances" of the "same government" alleged to have plotted Assange's killing. According to his partner Stella Moris, Assange had a mini-stroke on 27 October while sitting through the court hearing. Assange was subsequently given anti-stroke medication.

On 10 December 2021 the High Court ruled in favour of the United States. The Lord Chief Justice and Lord Justice Holroyde ruled that "if the assurances had been before the judge, she would have answered the relevant question differently" and allowed his extradition. The case was remitted to Westminster Magistrates' Court with the direction that it be sent to the home secretary Priti Patel for the final decision on whether to extradite Assange. On 24 January 2022 Assange was granted permission to petition the Supreme Court of the United Kingdom for an appeal hearing, but in March the court refused to allow the appeal, saying that Assange had not raised an arguable point of law.

On 20 April 2022 Chief Magistrate Paul Goldspring of the Westminster Magistrates Court formally approved the extradition of Assange to the US and referred the decision to the home secretary Priti Patel. On 17 June 2022, Patel approved the extradition.

On 1 July 2022 Assange lodged an appeal against the extradition in the High Court. On 22 August 2022, Assange's legal team lodged a Perfected Grounds of Appeal before the High Court challenging District Judge Vanessa Baraitser's decision of 4 January 2021 with new evidence. Assange also made a further appeal to the European Court of Human Rights.

In April 2023 European unions and associations of journalists from Portugal, Armenia, Great Britain and Greece granted Julian Assange honorary membership. The European Federation of Journalists (EFJ) and its affiliates joined the International Federation of Journalists (IFJ) to appeal to US and UK authorities to release Julian Assange and drop all charges. The EFJ was concerned about the impact of Assange's continued detention on media freedom and the rights of all journalists globally and urged European governments to work to secure Assange's release. In May 2023 Assange wrote a letter to King Charles III saying he was a political prisoner and requesting the King visit him in prison.

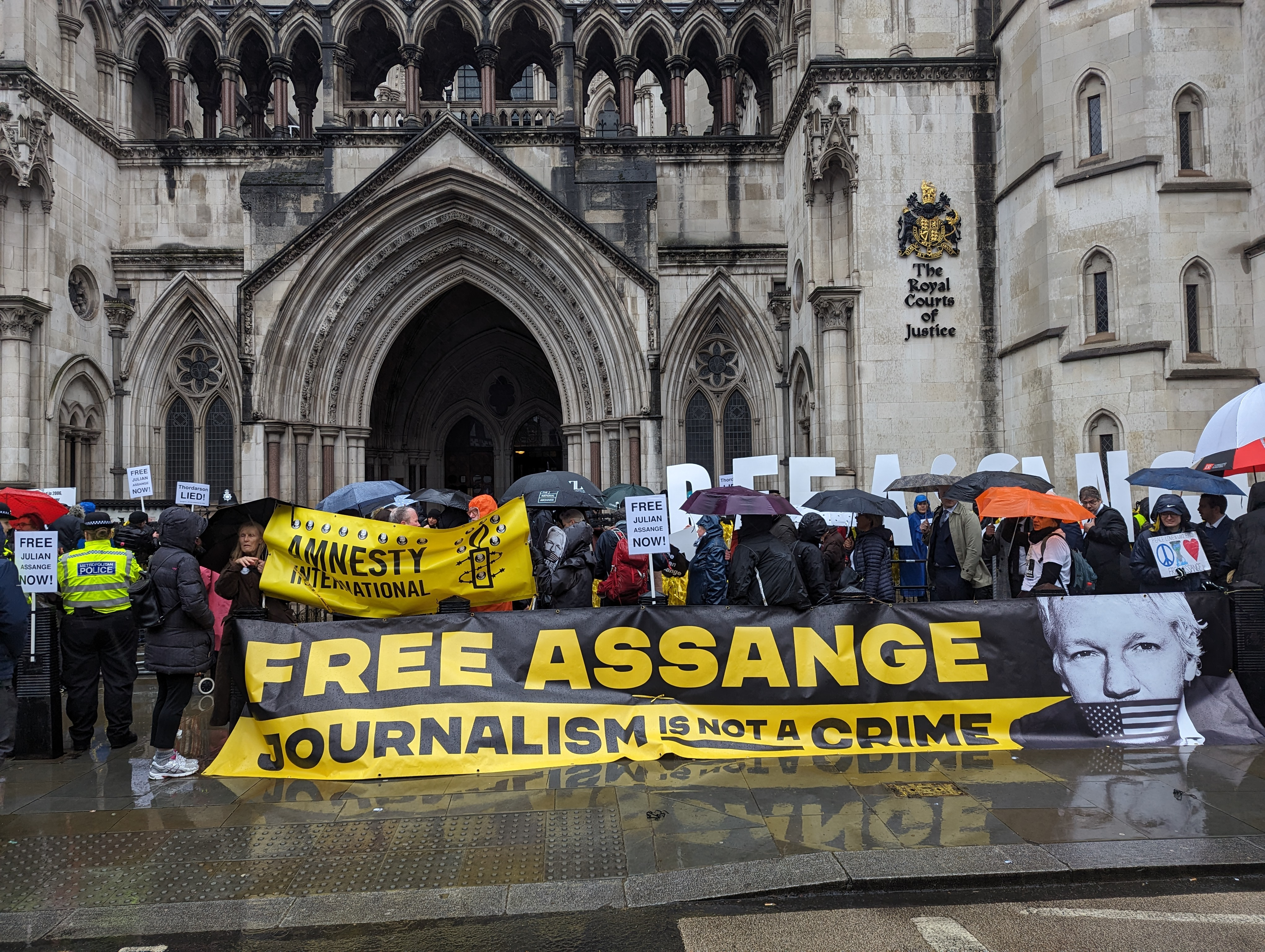
Protests outside the High Court in London in support of Assange, 21 February 2024.

In May 2023, Assange's lawyers said they were open to a plea deal but that "no crime has been committed and the facts involved in the case don't support a crime". In June 2023, The Age reported that the FBI was seeking to gather new evidence in the case, based on a request from the FBI to interview Andrew O'Hagan. O'Hagan refused the request and said to he "would not give a witness statement against a fellow journalist".

On 6 June 2023 the High Court in London dismissed Assange's appeal. Justice Jonathan Swift ruled that "none of the four grounds of appeal raises any properly arguable point". In a second ruling, Justice Swift denied Assange permission to challenge a January 2021 ruling by Judge Baraitser.

In June 2023, Stella Assange met Pope Francis to discuss her husband's release. The Pope wrote to Assange offering him asylum in the Vatican State.

A two-day hearing in the High Court began on 20 February 2024. Assange was too ill to attend. Assange's legal team requested leave to appeal the extradition order signed by Home Secretary Patel in 2022. On 26 March the judges issued a written judgement that was not a final decision. They sought assurances from the US government that Assange would be able to avail himself of the First Amendment, that he would not be prejudiced by his nationality, and that the death penalty would not be imposed. If these assurances were not forthcoming, Assange would be given leave to appeal. Assurances were provided by a diplomatic note from the US Embassy in London on 16 April. This stated that Assange "will not be prejudiced by reason of his nationality with respect to which defences he may seek to raise at trial and at sentencing"; that "A sentence of death will neither be sought nor imposed"; and that Assange had "the ability to raise and seek to rely upon" the First Amendment, but that its applicability "is exclusively within the purview of the US courts". Stella Assange commented on this "The United States has issued a non-assurance in relation to the first amendment, and a standard assurance in relation to the death penalty." On 20 May, the two High Court judges, Dame Victoria Sharp and Sir Jeremy Johnson, found that the assurances regarding the First Amendment and the nationality question were not sufficient and gave Assange leave to appeal against extradition.

== Plea bargain and release ==
Superseding indictment as part of the plea bargain filed with the District Court for the Northern Mariana Islands.

=== Negotiations ===
In 2022 the incoming Australian Labor government of Anthony Albanese indicated that it opposed the continued prosecution of Assange but intended to pursue quiet diplomacy to prevent it. In July 2023, US secretary of state Antony Blinken rejected the Australian government's position, saying that Assange faced serious charges. On 14 August 2023, US ambassador to Australia Caroline Kennedy flagged a potential plea deal for Assange, shortly after meeting with a group of Australian parliamentarians pushing for Assange's return. On 14 February 2024, the Australian House of Representatives passed a motion put forward by independent MP Andrew Wilkie calling for Assange's immediate release and return to Australia, by a vote of 86 to 42. On 10 April 2024, President Biden said that the US was considering the Australian government's call for Assange's return.

The London High Court's decision on 20 May 2024 to allow Assange to bring a full appeal to his extradition put pressure on the US Department of Justice to complete a plea deal they had already been signalling their willingness for. On the advice of their British lawyers, the US attorneys believed they would lose the case, triggering a breakthrough in plea negotiations.

=== Release ===
On 24 June 2024 a plea bargain was agreed, in which Assange would plead guilty to one felony count of violating the Espionage Act in exchange for immediate release. The agreement entailed the US Department of Justice seeking a sentence of 62 months, the time he had served in prison while awaiting extradition.

After release from HM Prison Belmarsh on 24 June 2024, Assange immediately flew via charter flight — with the accompaniment of his legal representatives and Australia's high commissioner to the United Kingdom, Stephen Smith — to Saipan to attend the federal courthouse of the District Court for the Northern Mariana Islands. After arrival into Saipan on 26 June, Assange and Smith were joined by Australian Ambassador to the United States, Kevin Rudd. Assange pleaded guilty to a charge under the Espionage Act of conspiracy to obtain and disclose national defence information. Judge Ramona Villagomez Manglona accepted Assange's guilty plea and sentenced him to 62 months' time served.

Assange and his group returned to the charter flight and flew to Canberra. As the plane arrived, Prime Minister Albanese phoned Assange; Assange told Albanese that he had saved his life. On disembarking, Assange was greeted by his wife Stella and father John Shipton. Stella and Assange's legal representatives Jennifer Robinson and Barry Pollack held a press conference later that evening which was attended by numerous Australian politicians. Assange was required by the Australian government to repay the costs of the flight.

In September 2024, Assange's brother Gabriel Shipton said that Assange's supporters were campaigning for a pardon from US president Biden. On 1 October 2024, Assange flew to Strasbourg, France, and addressed the Committee on Legal Affairs and Human Rights of the Council of Europe. He said he had pleaded guilty to journalism and had chosen freedom over justice.

On 2 May 2025, Assange released a public statement endorsing Albanese for the 2025 Australian federal election, expressing gratitude for the Prime Minister's role in his release.

== Post-release life ==
In August 2025, Assange attended the March for Humanity in Sydney, a large protest highlighting the plight of Palestinians in the Gaza conflict.

In December 2025, Assange lodged a criminal complaint with the Swedish police against the Nobel Foundation, in an effort to stop the Foundation transferring prize money to Venezuelan opposition politician Maria Corina Machado, who had been awarded the 2025 Nobel Peace Prize. Assange said the award to Machado constituted a "facilitation of war crimes" under Swedish law because Machado was inciting and endorsing the "commission of international crimes" by the United States during its campaign to remove Nicolás Maduro as president of Venezuela. Swedish police dismissed the complaint, saying it contained no information indicating that a crime had been committed.

== Works and views ==
In his 2012 book Cypherpunks: Freedom and the Future of the Internet, Assange wrote that his fundamental principle was "the traditional cypherpunk juxtaposition ... privacy for the weak, transparency for the powerful". He strongly advocated the use of encryption which he said should be used by individuals to protect themselves against the intrusions of governments, corporations, and surveillance agencies, and by states to protect themselves against Western imperialism.

In 2010 Assange said he was a libertarian and that "WikiLeaks is designed to make capitalism more free and ethical" and to expose injustice, not to be neutral. In 2013, Assange said that he was the "number three" hacker in the world. In 2017, Assange said WikiLeaks had a perfect record and that only 2% of mainstream journalists were "credible".

In 2012 Assange hosted the World Tomorrow show, broadcast by Russian network RT. He has written a few short pieces, including "State and terrorist conspiracies" (2006), "Conspiracy as governance" (2006), "The hidden curse of Thomas Paine" (2008), "What's new about WikiLeaks?" (2011), and the foreword to Cypherpunks (2012). He also received a co-writer credit for the Calle 13 song "Multi Viral" (2013). He produced the following films: Collateral Murder (2010), Mediastan (2013), and The Engineer (2013). He acted as himself in the episode "At Long Last Leave" of The Simpsons (2012).

In 2010 Assange received a deal for his autobiography worth at least US$1.3 million. In 2011, Canongate Books published Julian Assange, The Unauthorised Autobiography. Assange immediately disavowed it and accused Canongate of breaching their contract by publishing, against his wishes, a draft that Assange considered "a narrative and literary interpretation of a conversation between the writer and me". Assange added that it was "a work in progress" and "entirely uncorrected or fact-checked by me." In 2014, O'Hagan wrote about his experience as Assange's ghostwriter. "The story of his life mortified him and sent him scurrying for excuses", O'Hagan recalled. "He didn't want to do the book. He hadn't from the beginning." Colin Robinson, co-publisher of Assange's 2012 book Cypherpunks, criticised O'Hagan for largely ignoring the bigger issues about which Assange had been warning and noted that O'Hagan's piece "is no part of an organised dirty tricks campaign. But by focusing as it does on Assange's character defects, it ends up serving much the same purpose."

Assange's book When Google Met WikiLeaks was published by OR Books in 2014. It recounts when Google CEO Eric Schmidt met with Assange, while he was on bail in rural Norfolk, UK. Schmidt was accompanied by Jared Cohen, Scott Malcomson, and Lisa Shields, vice-president of the Council on Foreign Relations. Excerpts were published on the Newsweek website, while Assange participated in a Q&A event on Reddit website. In 2015 The WikiLeaks Files: The World According to The US Empire was published with an introduction by Assange.

In 2011 an article in Private Eye by its editor, Ian Hislop, recounted a phone call he had received from Assange, who was angry about Private Eye's report that Israel Shamir, an Assange associate in Russia, was a Holocaust denier. According to Hislop, Assange suggested "that British journalists, including the editor of The Guardian, were engaged in a Jewish-led conspiracy to smear his organization." Assange responded that Hislop had "distorted, invented or misremembered almost every significant claim and phrase." He added, "We treasure our strong Jewish support and staff, just as we treasure the support from pan-Arab democracy activists and others who share our hope for a just world."

== Books and films featuring Assange ==
=== Books ===
==== As author or contributor ====
- Suelette Dreyfus; with research by Julian Assange. Underground: Tales of Hacking, Madness and Obsession on the Electronic Frontier (1997). Melbourne: Mandarin. ISBN 978-1-86330-595-2.
- Assange, Julian; O'Hagan, Andrew (ghostwriter). Julian Assange: The Unauthorised Autobiography (2011). Edinburgh: Canongate Books. ISBN 978-0857863843.
- Julian Assange; with Jacob Appelbaum, Andy Müller-Maguhn, and Jérémie Zimmermann. Cypherpunks: Freedom and the Future of the Internet (2012). New York: OR Books. ISBN 978-1-939293-00-8.
- Assange, Julian. When Google Met WikiLeaks (2014). New York: OR Books. ISBN 978-1-939293-57-2.
- Stoeckley, Clark (2014). The United States vs. Private Chelsea Manning: A Graphic Account from Inside the Courtroom. Preface by Julian Assange. New York: OR Books. ISBN 978-1-939293-27-5.
- WikiLeaks (2015). The WikiLeaks Files: The World According to US Empire. Introduction by Julian Assange. London: Verso Books. ISBN 978-1-78168-874-8.
- Richter, Angela, ed. (2015). Supernerds: Gespräche mit Helden (in German). Includes an interview with Julian Assange. Berlin: Alexander Verlag Berlin. ISBN 978-3-89581-372-6.
- Ramonet, Ignacio (2015). L'Empire de la surveillance: Suivi de deux entretiens avec Julian Assange et Noam Chomsky (in French). Includes an interview with Julian Assange. Paris: Éditions Galilée. ISBN 978-2-7186-0929-4.
- Lauria, Joe (2017). How I Lost by Hillary Clinton. Foreword by Julian Assange. New York: OR Books. ISBN 978-1-68219-085-2.
- Stiegler, Bernard, ed.; with Julian Assange, et al.⠀, ed. (2017). La toile que nous voulons: Le web néguentropique (in French). Includes "Dialogue avec Julian Assange". FYP Éditions. ISBN 978-2-36405-147-8.
- Ali, Tariq; Ratner Kunstler, Margaret, eds. (2019). In Defense of Julian Assange. Includes republished material by Julian Assange, who is credited as a contributor. OR Books. ISBN 978-1-68219-221-4.
- Assange, Julian (2021). Sharpe, Karen (ed.). Julian Assange in His Own Words. Anthology of quotations from Assange's writings, interviews, and public statements. OR Books. ISBN 978-1-68219-263-4.

=== Films ===
==== Documentaries ====
- The War You Don't See (2010), by John Pilger.
- We Steal Secrets: The Story of WikiLeaks (2013), American documentary.
- Citizenfour (2014) by Laura Poitras.
- The Yes Men Are Revolting (2014)
- Terminal F/Chasing Edward Snowden (2015)
- Risk (2016) [also known as Asylum], a film which documents Laura Poitras's disillusionment with Assange.
- Hacking Justice (2017), German documentary.
- Architects of Denial (2017)
- The New Radical (2017)
- Ithaka (2021), Australian film produced by Assange's half-brother Gabriel Shipton, which deals with his father John Shipton's worldwide campaign for Julian's release.
- The Six Billion Dollar Man (2025)

==== Dramas ====
- Underground: The Julian Assange Story (2012), Australian TV drama that premiered at the Toronto International Film Festival.
- Julian (2012), Australian short film about nine-year-old Julian Assange. The film won several awards and prizes.
- The Fifth Estate (2013), American thriller that Assange said was a "serious propaganda attack" on WikiLeaks and its staff.

== Personal life ==
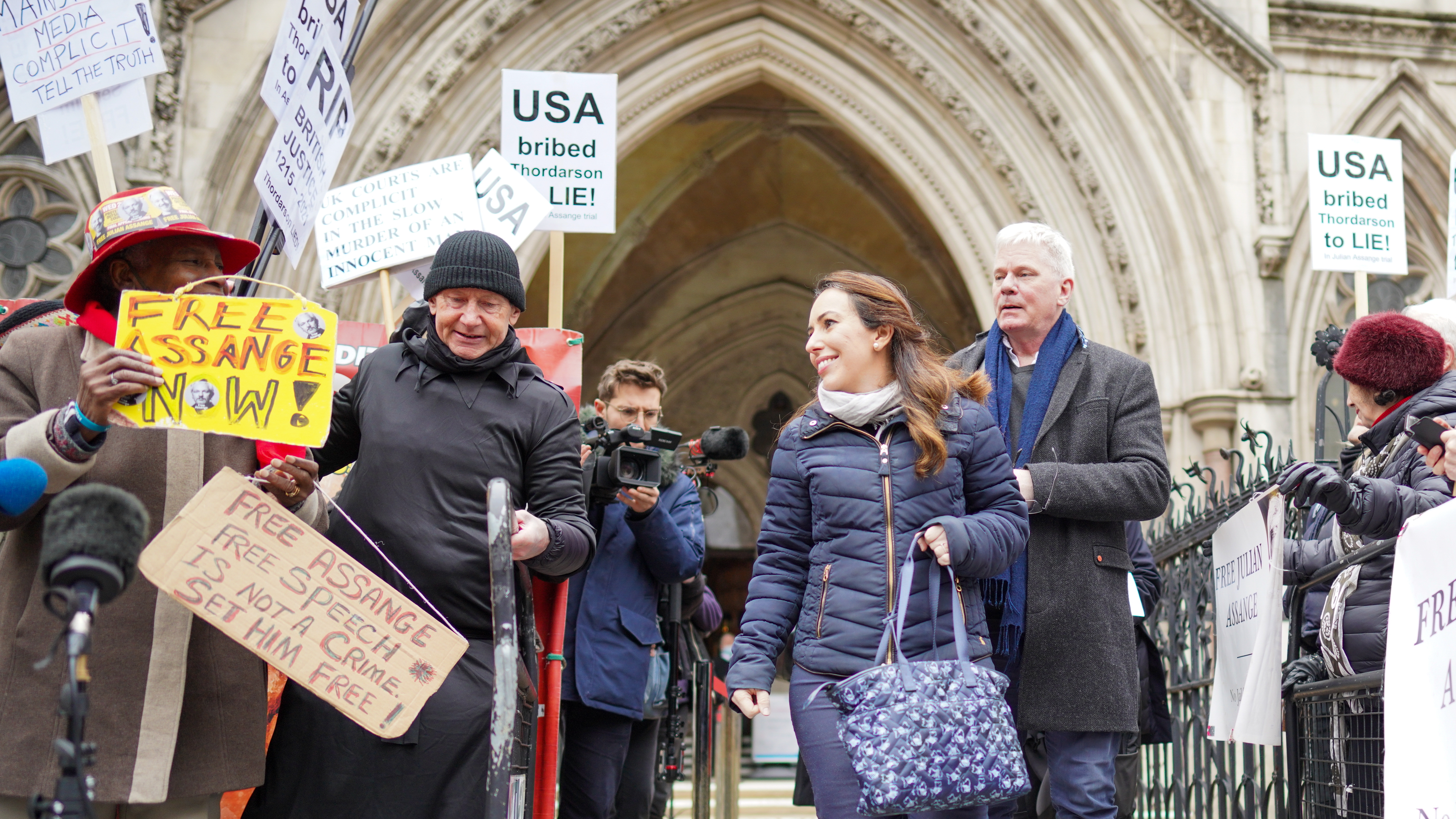
Stella Moris with supporters leaving the High Court in January 2022

Assange has two younger paternal half-siblings: brother Gabriel Shipton and sister Severine (born 2016). Assange also has a younger maternal half-brother (born c. 1980), from his mother's relationship with Leif Meynell Hamilton.

As a teenager, Assange married Teresa, also in her teens, and in 1989 they had a son. The couple separated and disputed custody of their son until 1999. According to Assange's mother, his brown hair turned white during the time of the custody dispute.

Daniel Domscheit-Berg said in his 2011 memoir Inside WikiLeaks that Assange said he had fathered several children. In an email in January 2007, Assange mentioned having a daughter. In 2015, in an open letter to the French president Hollande Assange revealed he had another child. He said that this child, his youngest, was French, as was the child's mother. He also said his family had faced death threats and harassment because of his work, forcing them to change identities and reduce contact with him.

In 2015, while in the embassy, Assange began a relationship with Stella Moris, one of his lawyers. They were engaged in 2017 and have two sons, born in 2017 and 2019. Stella revealed their relationship in 2020 because she feared for Assange's life. On 7 November 2021, the couple initiated legal action against deputy UK prime minister Dominic Raab and Jenny Louis, governor of Belmarsh Prison, for denying them and their children's human rights by blocking and delaying their marriage. On 11 November, the prison service said it had granted permission for them to marry in Belmarsh Prison, and on 23 March 2022 they married.

== Commentary about Assange ==
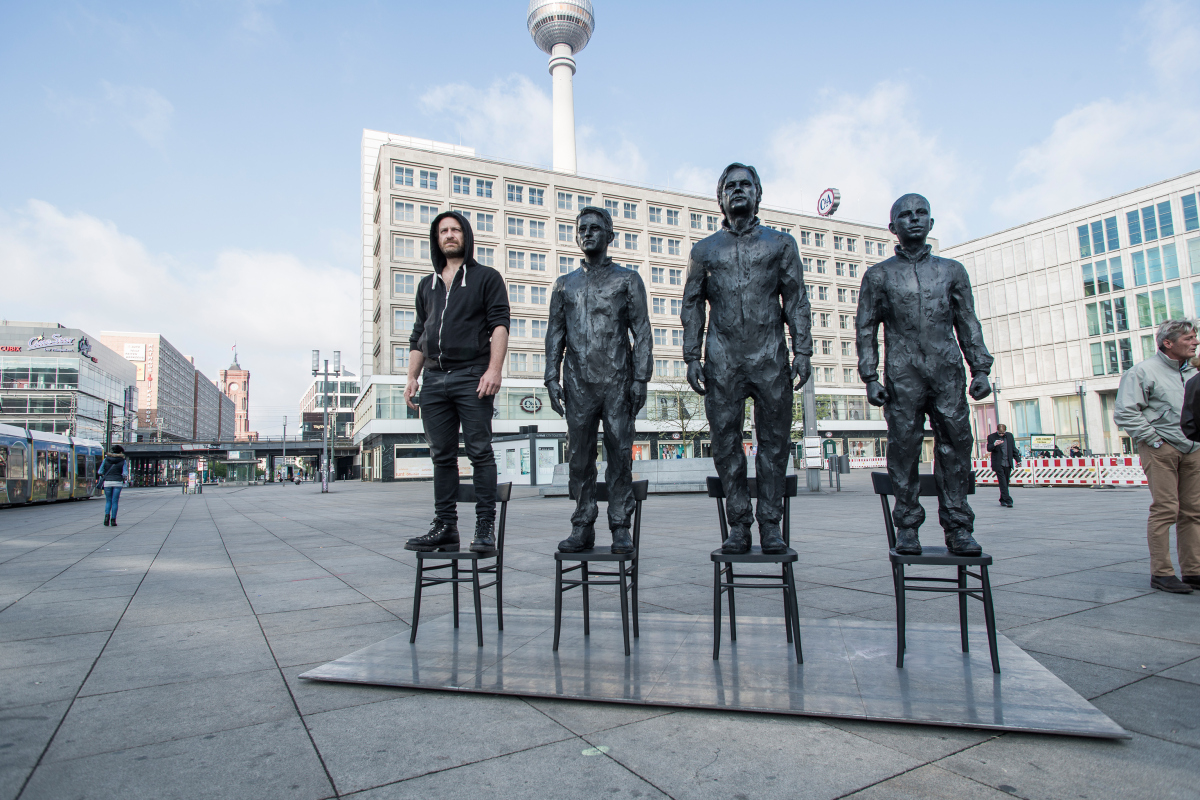
The travelling art installation Anything to Say? by Davide Dormino featuring bronze sculptures of Assange, Snowden, and Manning standing on chairs in Berlin on May Day 2015

Views on Julian Assange have been given by a number of public figures, including journalists, well-known whistleblowers, activists and world leaders. They range from laudatory statements to calls for his execution. Various journalists and free speech advocates have praised Assange for his work and dedication to free speech. Some former colleagues have criticised his work habits, editorial decisions and personality. After the 2016 US presidential election, there was debate about his motives and his ties to Russia.

After Assange's arrest in 2019, journalists and commentators debated whether Assange was a journalist. In 2024, Assange's legal counsel referred to him as a "journalist who exposed U.S. military wrongdoing in Iraq and Afghanistan", while the US government stated his actions went "way beyond those of a journalist gathering information, amounting to an attempt to solicit, steal and indiscriminately publish classified government documents".

== Honours and awards ==
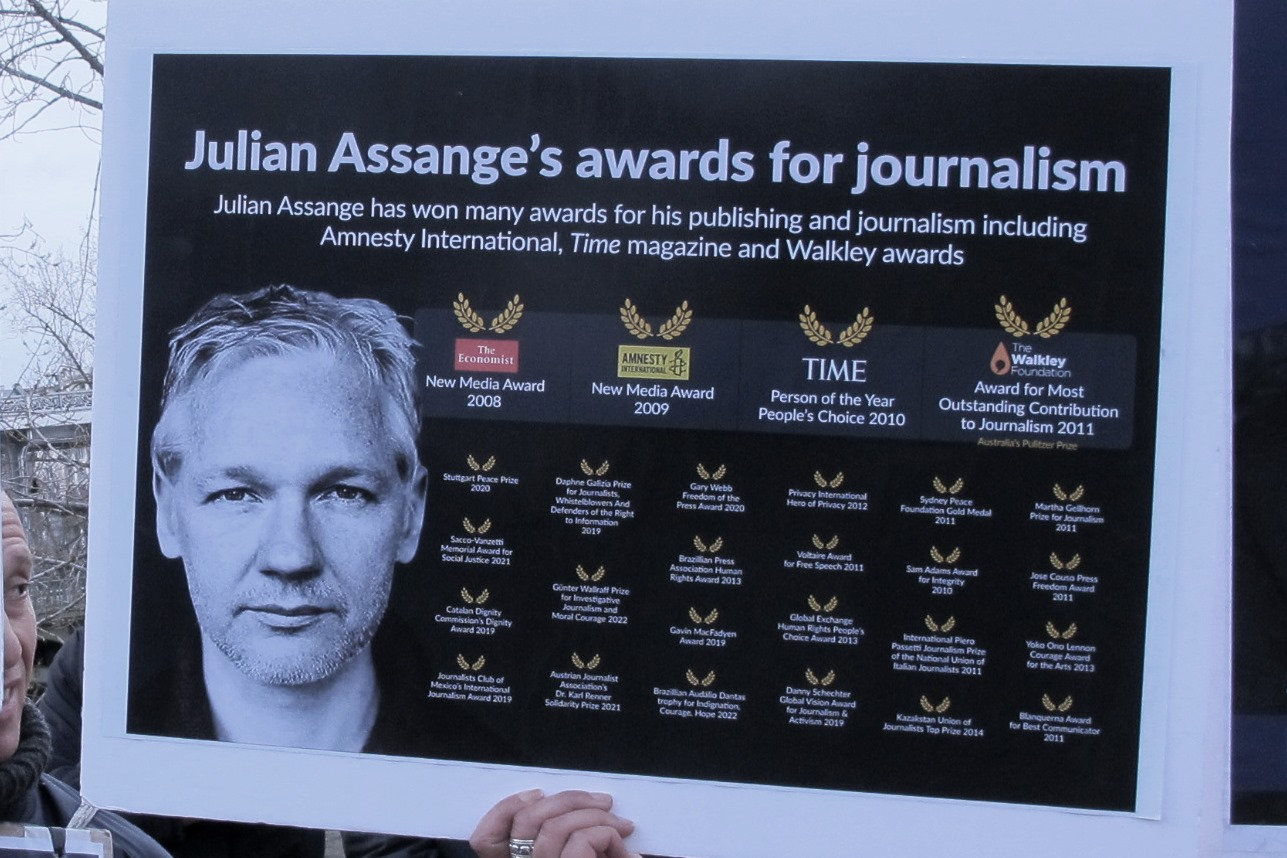
Awards received by Julian Assange for his investigative work listed on a protest sign in February 2024.

- 2008, The Economist New Media Award
- 2009, Amnesty International UK New Media Award for Kenya: The Cry of Blood—Extra Judicial Killings and Disappearances
- 2010, Time Person of the Year, Reader's Choice
- 2010, Sam Adams Award
- 2010, Le Monde Readers' Choice Award for Person of the Year
- 2010, "Rockstar of the year" by the Italian edition of Rolling Stone
- 2010, Honorary member, Media, Entertainment and Arts Alliance (Australia)
- 2011, Free Dacia Award
- 2011, Sydney Peace Foundation Gold Medal
- 2011, Walkley Award
- 2011, Martha Gellhorn Prize for Journalism
- 2011, Voltaire Award for Free Speech
- 2012, Big Brother Award Italy 2012 "Hero of Privacy"
- 2013, Global Exchange Human Rights Award, People's Choice
- 2013, Yoko Ono Lennon Courage Award for the Arts
- 2013, New York Festivals World's Best TV & Films Silver World Medal
- 2013 The Brazilian Press Association Human Rights Award
- 2014, Union of Journalists in Kazakhstan Top Prize
- 2019, GUE/NGL Galizia prize
- 2019, Gavin MacFadyen award
- 2019, Catalan Dignity Prize
- 2020, Stuttgart Peace Prize
- 2021, Honorary member, PEN Centre Germany
- 2023, Konrad Wolf Prize
- 2023, Political asylum refugee status by Italian city Perugia
- 2023, Ossietzky Award
- 2024, Honorary citizen of Rome

== See also ==
- List of people who took refuge in a diplomatic mission
- List of hackers
- List of Amnesty International-designated prisoners of conscience
- Ola Bini, who was arrested in April 2019 in Ecuador apparently due to his association with Assange and WikiLeaks. He was acquitted of all charges in January 2023.
- Thomas A. Drake, former senior executive of the National Security Agency (NSA), and a whistleblower.
- Jeremy Hammond, who was summoned to appear before a Virginia federal grand jury which was investigating Assange. He was held in civil contempt of court after refusing to testify.
- Lauri Love, who in 2018 won an appeal in the High Court of England and Wales against extradition to the United States
- Gary McKinnon, whose extradition to the United States was blocked in 2012 by UK Home Secretary Theresa May
- Stratfor email leak, leaked emails from geopolitical intelligence company Stratfor in which staff discuss strategies for dealing with Assange
