= Saeed Chmagh =

Iraqi Reuters employee killed by U.S. forces (1967-2007)

Coordinates: 33.3137°N 44.512°E

- Born: January 1, 1967; Iraq
- Died: July 12, 2007 (aged 40); Baghdad, Iraq
- Cause of death: 30 mm armor-piercing shell
- Occupations: Driver and camera assistant
- Employer: Reuters
- Children: 4

Saeed Chmagh (Arabic: سعيد شماغ) (January 1, 1967 – July 12, 2007) was an Iraqi employed by Reuters news agency as a driver and camera assistant. He was killed, along with his colleague Namir Noor-Eldeen, by American military forces in the New Baghdad district of Baghdad, Iraq, during an airstrike on July 12, 2007.

== Life and career ==
Chmagh was born January 1, 1967, in Iraq. He joined Reuters before the United States-led invasion in 2003. With 4 children of his own, he financially supported his family and another three through his work. Chmagh also supported his sister's family after insurgents killed her husband.

Chris Helgren, then Reuters' chief photographer in the region, launched a plan to employ and train Iraqis, with more local knowledge and access to areas now perilous for Westerners. Helgren said: "There are few 'good news' stories to be had in this war and wars by definition are tales of violence. And to get there, drivers like Saeed Chmagh are indispensable." "Saeed had a reputation of being fiercely loyal and appeared fearless to me. If you ever needed to get quickly to a dangerous area, passing chicanes of barbed wire and boobytraps, Saeed was your man. But he also had a very quiet, loving side and spoke often of his kids."

== Airstrike and death ==
On July 12, 2007, after several skirmishes in the area, two American AH-64 Apache helicopters observed a group of people milling around on a street in Baghdad. Believing the group to be the armed Iraqi insurgents who earlier engaged U.S. soldiers nearby, the Apache fired on them. About 5 minutes later an unmarked black van arrived, owned by a man who was taking his son to school. Two other men arrived and assisted the severely-injured Chmagh (who was at that moment engaged in dragging himself over the ground in order to reach cover) and carried him to the van. The observing helicopter crews requested and received permission to engage, before they opened fire on the van and its occupants. Two young children in the van were severely wounded by the shooting. Chmagh, and Reuters photojournalist, his long-time friend Namir Noor-Eldeen, were among those killed in the attacks. Chmagh was 40 years old at the time of his death. Chmagh and Noor-Eldeen were the fifth and sixth Reuters employees killed in Iraq since the 2003 U.S.-led invasion began. The Army's report includes pictures of various weapons found near the bodies at the scene.

After their deaths, Reuters screened a photographic tribute to Noor-Eldeen and Chmagh in New York City's Times Square and London's Canary Wharf. The shootings and their deaths are detailed in a 2009 non-fiction book by David Finkel, titled The Good Soldiers.

== Video release ==
For more than three years after the shooting, Reuters and other organizations sought probes into the deaths of Noor-Eldeen and other journalists killed in Iraq, but the U.S. military withheld key information on the grounds that it was classified. The military also refused to release a video taken from one of the gunships that captured the complete sequence and radio communication during the shootings. On April 5, 2010, the video was released on the website WikiLeaks, which said it acquired the video from military whistle-blowers and viewed it after breaking the encryption code.
