= Namir Noor-Eldeen =

Iraqi photographer, killed by U.S. forces (1984–2007)

Coordinates: 33.3137°N 44.512°E

- نمير نورالدين
- Born: September 1, 1984; Mosul, Nineveh, Iraq
- Died: July 12, 2007 (aged 22); Baghdad al-Jidida, Iraq
- Cause of death: Armor-piercing shell
- Occupation: Photojournalist
- Employer: Reuters International

Namir Noor-Eldeen (Arabic: نمير نورالدين; September 1, 1984 – July 12, 2007) was an Iraqi war photographer for Reuters. Noor-Eldeen, his assistant, Saeed Chmagh, as well as eight others were fired upon by U.S. military forces in the New Baghdad district of Baghdad, Iraq, during an airstrike on July 12, 2007.

It is claimed in an official report from the U.S. Department of the Army that the group of 10 was carrying at least one RPG-7 and one AK-47, in addition to the fact that Noor-Eldeen's camera and attached zoom lens likely were mistaken for an additional RPG. Noor-Eldeen and seven others were killed during the first strike.

== Early life and career ==
Noor-Eldeen was born on September 1, 1984, in Mosul, Iraq. He developed an interest in photography and video from his family, and started training in those crafts. He was one of the first photographers trained by the Reuters news agency as part of a strategy to employ photojournalists with strong local knowledge and access to areas considered too dangerous for Western photographers to work in. Chris Helgren, former Reuters chief photographer who instigated the agency's plan, called Noor-Eldeen one of the star recruits of the initial recruitment stage, and said, "In Mosul, he started from nothing and is now the pre-eminent photographer in Northern Iraq."

He originally worked in Mosul, where he started to develop a strong reputation from his photos and his tendency to arrive at the scene of attacks quickly, even amid danger. One of his photos, of a masked insurgent carrying a RPG-7 and a police flak jacket after a November 2004 police station attack, gained particular attention and was described by New York Times journalist Michael Kamber as "one of the seminal images of the war—a single photo that captured Iraq's descent into chaos and the inability of the Iraqi and American governments to protect resources, or pretty much anything else at that point". Noor-Eldeen was transferred to Baghdad after he started receiving threats in Mosul from insurgents unhappy with his photos. During his time as a photographer, he had been shot in the leg, had his nose broken more than once, and had been detained and harassed, but his editors said he maintained a sense of energy and optimism.

== Airstrike and death ==
Footage from the gun-camera of an AH-64 Apache which had opened fire on individuals on the ground several minutes earlier, resulting in multiple casualties, among them Namir Noor-Eldeen. The text beneath the image is a subtitle of the radio transmissions occurring at that time in the video.

On July 12, 2007, after several skirmishes in the area, two American AH-64 Apache helicopters observed a group of people milling around on a street in Baghdad. They reported some in that group to be armed, presumed them to be Iraqi insurgents, and fired on them. The helicopters also fired on a van being driven by a man with his two children inside that stopped to evacuate the wounded. Both children were wounded. Noor-Eldeen and his Reuters driver, Saeed Chmagh, were among those killed in the attack. Noor-Eldeen was 22 years old at the time of his death.

Noor-Eldeen and Chmagh were the fifth and sixth Reuters employees killed in Iraq since the 2003 invasion began. All six were killed by American soldiers. Mohammed Ameen, another Reuters photographer and one of Noor-Eldeen's closest friends, found his body in a dilapidated Iraqi morgue and arranged for the body to be preserved until his funeral. After their deaths, Reuters screened a photographic tribute to Noor-Eldeen and Chmagh in New York City's Times Square and London's Canary Wharf.

=== Video release ===
For more than two years after the shooting, Reuters and other organizations sought probes into the deaths of Noor-Eldeen and other journalists killed in Iraq, but the U.S. military withheld key information on the grounds that it was classified. The military also refused to release a video taken from one of the gunships that captured the complete sequence and radio communication during the shootings.

On April 5, 2010, WikiLeaks published a video titled Collateral Murder on its website, which shows part of the military video. WikiLeaks said it acquired the video from military whistle-blowers and viewed it after breaking the encryption code. The shootings and Noor-Eldeen's deaths are detailed in The Good Soldiers, a 2009 nonfiction book by David Finkel.
