= Barbora Bukovská (attorney) =

Czech-Slovak attorney and activist

Barbora Bukovská is a Czech-Slovak human rights attorney and activist, known originally for her work on racial discrimination of Romani people in the Czech Republic and Slovakia, and later for free speech advocacy.

== Advocacy ==
=== Roma rights ===
Bukovská first worked as a human rights attorney with the Czech non-governmental organizations Czech Helsinki Committee, Nadace Tolerance and Poradna pro občanství. Before anti-discrimination laws were adopted, she initiated the first Czech strategic litigation cases concerning discrimination against Romani people in access to public services, housing, employment and within the criminal justice system, and used the courts to bring a change in the law.

In 2001, by coincidence, she uncovered a practice of forced sterilization of Romani women in Slovakia. To pursue justice for victims, she founded the Center for Civil and Human Rights, Košice, Slovakia. In 2003, she published her findings about this practice in a controversial report "Body and Soul", for which she was criminally prosecuted by the Slovak Government. The Slovak Government rejected the report as unfounded; but it was widely supported and backed up internationally, including by the U.S. Congress Helsinki Commission, the Commissioner for Human Rights of the Council of Europe, Amnesty International and others. Since then, she has been representing victims of this practice in the courts.

In 2009, she won a case, K.H. and Others vs. Slovakia at the European Court for Human Rights (ECHR), concerning the access of forcibly sterilized women to their medical documents. Subsequently, she won several cases at the ECHR concerning forced sterilizations, most importantly:

- On 8 November 2011, the case V. C. vs. Slovakia, which was described as ground-breaking.
- On 8 February 2012, the case N. B. vs. Slovakia, which concerned the sterilization of a minor.
- On 13 November 2012, the case I.G. and Others vs. Slovakia, in which the Court reaffirmed its earlier position but also, for the first time, found that the Slovak authorities had failed to properly investigate the crimes committed by staff at the concerned hospitals; this factor had not been addressed in earlier cases.

Other cases were litigated and won at the Slovak courts. She also represented a forcibly sterilized Roma woman from the Czech Republic at the European Court in R.K. vs the Czech Republic.

=== Rights of people with disabilities ===
From 2006 to 2008, Bukovská was a legal director of the Mental Disability Advocacy Center. She initiated and litigated many high-profile cases at the European Court against Russia, Bulgaria, Estonia, Hungary or the Czech Republic concerning the rights of people with mental health disabilities. Most important were S. vs Estonia (concerning involuntary admission to a psychiatric clinic), Ryabov v. Russia, Plesó vs. Hungary (concerning forced committal to a psychiatric hospital for "prevention treatment"), Bures vs. the Czech Republic( in which the European Court stated that unauthorized use of restraint in psychiatric hospital constituted inhuman and degrading treatment), Sykora vs. the Czech Republic (concerning the removal of the legal capacity and detention in a psychiatric hospital) and Stankov vs. Bulgaria (concerning deprivation of legal capacity and forced placement in a social care institution).

In 2006, she published another controversial paper on the exploitation of the suffering of victims of human rights violations by international human rights organizations at the Cairo conference of the Open Society Institute; the paper was later re-published by PILnet: The Global Network for Public Interest Law, and Sur Journal.

=== Free speech ===
Since 2009, Bukovská has been working for ARTICLE 19, an international free speech organization.

Bukovská is a member of the Expert group against SLAPPs (strategic litigation against public participation) as an individual expert appointed by the European Commission; and the Transatlantic High-Level Working Group on Content Moderation Online and Freedom of Expression, co-chaired by Susan Ness, Former Member of Federal Communications Commission and Marietje Schaake, former member of the European Parliament.

In August 2013, together with Gavin MacFadyen, and Julian Assange, she founded Courage Foundation, originally the Journalistic Source Protection Defence Fund. Bukovská served on the Foundation Board till November 2016. In this period, Courage Foundation supported legal defense and advocacy for Edward Snowden (NSA whistleblower), Jeremy Hammond (Stratfor hacktivist), Matt DeHart, Lauri Love and Chelsea Manning.

== Honours and awards ==
Bukovská received a Woman of the World Award from American magazine Marie Claire in 2004.

== Personal life ==
She is the niece of John Bukovsky, the first papal nuncio in the Russian Federation. She volunteers for the Catholic Worker Movement.
