= Barbora Bukovská =

Barbora Bukovská may refer to:

- Barbora Bukovská (attorney)
- Barbora Bukovská (cyclist)
