= Bank Julius Baer v. WikiLeaks =

2008 U.S. federal lawsuit

- Court: United States District Court for the Northern District of California
- Full case name: Bank Julius Baer & Co. Ltd. v. WikiLeaks et al.'
- Decided: February 29, 2008
- Docket nos.: 3:08-cv-00824
- Citation: 535 F. Supp. 2d 980

Court membership
- Judge sitting: Jeffrey White

Bank Julius Baer & Co. v. WikiLeaks, 535 F. Supp. 2d 980 (N.D. Cal. 2008), was a lawsuit filed by Bank Julius Baer against the website WikiLeaks.

In early February 2008, Judge Jeffrey White of the U.S. District Court for the Northern District of California forced Dynadot, the domain registrar of wikileaks.org, to disassociate the site's domain name records with its servers, preventing use of the domain name to reach the site. Initially, the bank only wanted the documents to be removed (WikiLeaks had failed to name a contact person).

The judge's actions roused media and cyber-liberties groups to defend WikiLeaks' rights under the First Amendment and brought renewed scrutiny to the documents the bank hoped to shield.

The judge lifted the injunction and the bank dropped the case on 5 March 2008.

== Background ==
In 2002, the bank learned that records pertaining to the arrangement of anonymizing trusts in the Cayman Islands for clients from 1997 to 2002 had been leaked. They interviewed the local employees with a polygraph as per company policy. The bank was unsatisfied with the answers of Cayman unit COO Rudolf Elmer, and terminated his employment. In June 2005, the leak was reported by the Swiss financial weekly Cash and The Wall Street Journal, though details of individual accounts were not reported on.

According to Daniel Schmitt's analysis for WikiLeaks, leaked account data exists from after the date that Elmer left the Caymans.

On 16 January 2011, Elmer announced he would hand over offshore account details of 2,000 "high-net-worth individuals" to WikiLeaks. Then he would return to Switzerland from exile to face trial. Julius Baer says Elmer falsified the documents.

== Legal action, injunction ==
In January, Bank Julius Baer began sending cease & desist letters to WikiLeaks and its domain registrar, Dynadot, for the wikileaks.org domain name, citing the DMCA. On 18 February 2008, Judge Jeffrey White of the U.S. District Court for the Northern District of California issued a permanent injunction against Dynadot forcing it to lock the wikileaks.org domain name. According to the BBC, Julius Baer asked for the documents to be removed because they could interfere with another legal case in Switzerland.

Mirror sites were not affected. A coincidental fire at the hosting company used by WikiLeaks, PRQ, centered in a high power supply regulator serving the majority of the data center, shut down and destroyed some sections of the specific DNS and dedicated hosting server racks used by WikiLeaks the same week.

== Reaction ==
The Julius Baer lawsuit drew more attention due to the Streisand effect. Julius Baer had already got an injunction against WikiLeaks, prohibiting WikiLeaks from circulating the documents that Julius Baer wanted to suppress, without attracting significant attention from news media. A second injunction by Julius Baer imposed a measure drew attention that would suppress not only the information that Julius Baer considered embarrassing, but also the entire WikiLeaks website. Only 14 of these documents were pertinent to the Julius Baer case.

Alternate WikiLeaks domains were unaffected, and WikiLeaks was still available directly by its IP address. To shut down these access methods, it would be necessary to pursue injunctions in the jurisdictions where they are registered, or where the servers reside, which are deliberately scattered to make this difficult.

When someone said they were misidentified in a Julius Baer document as having a secret Swiss bank account Assange and Domscheit-Berg added a caveat to the document saying, "according to three independent sources" the information might be false or misleading. Domscheit-Berg later wrote that they made up the "three independent sources" and that the source had "included some background information he had researched about the bank's clients" that misidentified a Swiss account holder as a German man with a similar name.

== Injunction lifted ==
After the injunction was initially granted, it was successfully challenged in a joint action by the Electronic Frontier Foundation (EFF), American Civil Liberties Union (ACLU), Project on Government Oversight (POGO), and Jordan McCorkle. A similar brief was filed by Public Citizen and California First Amendment Coalition (CFAC).

Another brief in support of WikiLeaks was filed by the Reporters Committee for Freedom of the Press (RCFP), American Society of Newspaper Editors (ASNE), Associated Press (AP), Citizen Media Law Project, E.W. Scripps Company, Gannett Company, Inc., Hearst Corporation, Los Angeles Times, National Newspaper Association (NNA), Radio-Television News Directors Association (RTNDA), and Society of Professional Journalists (SPJ) which also provided some legal funding.

Judge White dissolved the injunction on 29 February 2008, allowing WikiLeaks to restore its domain name.

The bank dropped the case on 5 March 2008.
