= Courage Foundation =

Fundraising trust for whistleblowers and journalists

Courage International (formerly Courage Foundation) is an international non-governmental organisation based in Belgium that supports whistleblowers and journalists by fundraising for their legal defence. The Courage Foundation supported WikiLeaks, Julian Assange, Edward Snowden (NSA whistleblower), Jeremy Hammond (Stratfor hacktivist), Matt DeHart, Lauri Love and Chelsea Manning.

== History ==
Founded on August 9, 2013, as the Journalistic Source Protection Defence Fund by Gavin MacFadyen, Barbora Bukovska and Julian Assange it later rebranded in June 2014.In 2025 the Courage Foundation established an international NGO in Belgium and renamed itself to Courage International

WikiLeaks section editor Sarah Harrison served as acting director from 2014 until April 2017, when WikiLeaks became a Courage beneficiary and Naomi Colvin began serving as director. Colvin served as director until 2018. As of 2025, Þórhildur Sunna Ævarsdóttir serves as Global Director of Courage International.

Trustees included Pentagon Papers whistleblower Daniel Ellsberg, former NSA executive Thomas Drake, former MI5 British intelligence officer and whistleblower Annie Machon, Vice President of the Wau Holland Foundation Andy Müller-Maguhn, and some members of Pussy Riot. As of 2022, the Courage trustees were Susan Benn and John Pilger. Guatemalan human rights lawyer Renata Ávila Pinto was a trustee before retiring in April 2018, and Dame Vivienne Westwood was a trustee before she died.

In 2018, three of the trustees decided to remove Barrett Brown from the Courage Foundation's beneficiary list over negative remarks he had made about Julian Assange. Courage trustee Susan Benn told Brown that Courage would no longer help him. In response, Courage Foundation director Naomi Colvin quit in protest. Brown alleged that he had only been given about $3,500 out of the total $14,000 that had been donated to Courage for him.

In October 2019, a former Organisation for the Prohibition of Chemical Weapons (OPCW) employee later identified as Brendan Whelan presented his dissent with the OPCW's findings about the investigation of the Douma chemical attack. Members of the Courage Foundation who attended included Kristinn Hrafnsson, Jose Bustani, Helmut Lohre and Gunter Meyer. Courage Foundation published the Statement of Concern at the same time as "Berlin Group 21", which was allegedly created as a front for the Working Group on Syria, Propaganda and Media. Whelan later leaked OPCW documents to WikiLeaks.
