= N. B. vs. Slovakia =

N.B. vs Slovakia is the second case concerning forced sterilization of Romani people or Gypsy women from Slovakia decided by the European Court of Human Rights. The decision came only few months after the release of the judgment in the similar case V. C. vs. Slovakia. Once again, the Court unanimously found that the Romani woman had been sterilized without informed consent in contravention of Articles 3 and 8 of the European Convention on Human Rights.

N.B. was forcibly sterilized in the Gelnica Hospital, in Eastern Slovakia, during the caesarean section delivery of her second child v on 25 April 2001. At the time of sterilization, she was only 17 years old, and was a legal minor under the Slovak law. Informed consent of her legal guardians (parents) was legally required. However, the guardians did not give any consent to sterilization and no record on this was entered in the release report from the hospital. N.B. found about the sterilization only several months later, after her lawyers inspected her medical records in the Hospital.

Afterwards, in 2004, N.B. sued the Hospital for damages and she also started criminal proceedings against the doctors. In 2008, the District Court in Spišska Nova Ves found sterilization illegal and granted her compensations in amount of app. 1,590 EUR. N.B. found this inadequate in the view of the seriousness of the forced intervention. The police and the Constitutional Court of Slovakia rejected her complaints, so she brought the case to the European Court. The Court ruled in her favour on 12 June 2012.

N.B. was represented by lawyers from the Slovak feminist group Center for Civil and Human Rights from Košice who represent many other similar cases. After the decision, they called on the Slovak Government to compensate all the victims in pending cases instead of repeatedly "facing an international humiliation and condemnation".
