= ICWatch =

Database of LinkedIn profiles hosted by WikiLeaks

ICWATCH
- Available in: English
- Creator: Transparency Toolkit
- Website: icwatch.wikileaks.org
- Commercial: No
- Launched: May 6, 2015; 11 years ago
- Current status: Offline
- Written in: Ruby; JavaScript

ICWATCH is a public database of mainly LinkedIn profiles of people in the United States Intelligence Community. The database was created by Transparency Toolkit and was hosted by WikiLeaks.

== Background ==
The publication of global surveillance disclosures in 2013 revealed code names for surveillance projects including MARINA and MAINWAY. It was then discovered that the LinkedIn profiles of individuals in the intelligence community mentioned these code names as well as additional ones. Transparency Toolkit took advantage of this and automated the collection of LinkedIn profiles mentioning such code names, collating them into a searchable database.

== Name ==
The name "ICWATCH" is a play on ICREACH, an alleged top-secret, surveillance-related search engine created by the United States National Security Agency (NSA) after the September 11 attacks.

== History ==
The initial commit to the Git repository of LookingGlass was made on August 23, 2014. LookingGlass is a search tool that was built for use in ICWATCH.

ICWATCH launched on May 6, 2015; on the same day, Transparency Toolkit, the group that created ICWATCH, presented it at the re:publica conference. At launch, the database contained information from over 27,000 LinkedIn profiles.

By mid-May 2015, Transparency Toolkit began receiving requests from individuals to be removed from ICWATCH, including death threats. Following the threats as well as distributed denial-of-service attacks made against the site, WikiLeaks began hosting the website and database by the end of May 2015.

In August 2016 TechCrunch reported that LinkedIn was suing 100 unnamed individuals who had scraped LinkedIn's website, and named ICWATCH as a possible target.

As of February 2017, the database tracked over 100,000 profiles from LinkedIn, Indeed, and other public sources.

In November 2022, ICWATCH and other datasets became unavailable on the WikiLeaks website.

== Features ==
The database can be searched using the company, location, industry, and other parameters of the intelligence workers.

== Findings ==
Most of the discovered profiles are not of those in the National Security Agency but of those working for contractors.

The project also revealed possible trends in employment in the intelligence community. For instance, the "number of people claiming to work with SIGINT databases [...] has increased dramatically over the years since 2008, with just a small decline starting in 2013."

M. C. McGrath of Transparency Toolkit believes that the workers are "for the most part, pretty normal people".

== Reception ==
Ian Paul of PC World voiced concern for the safety of the individuals listed in the database.

== See also ==
- Open-source intelligence
- PRISM (surveillance program)
