= Todd Han =

Todd Han is an American software engineer and entrepreneur. He founded the domain registrar Dynadot in 2002.
