= Sarah Harrison (journalist) =

British WikiLeaks section editor

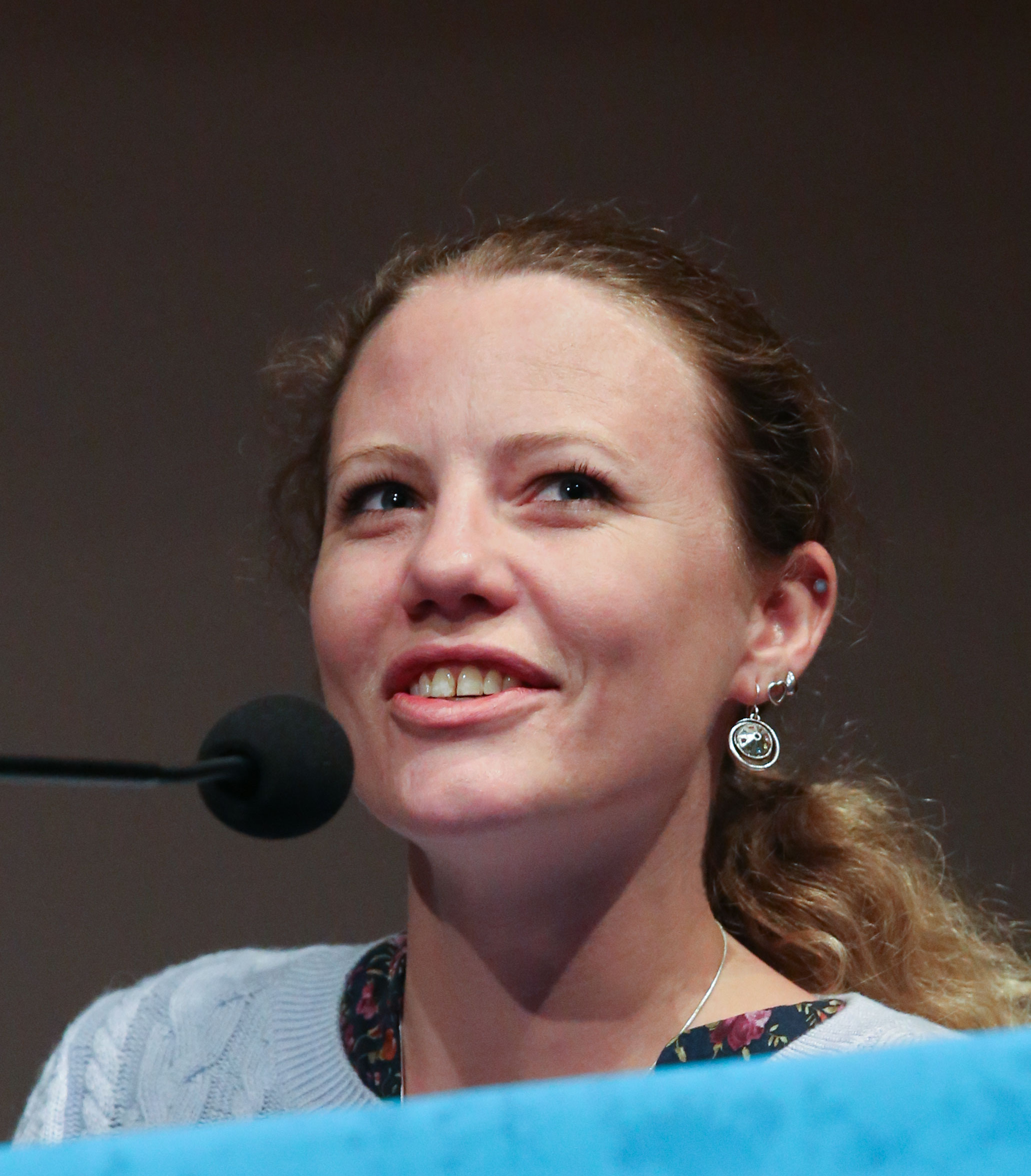
- Harrison at the 30th Chaos Communication Congress in Hamburg, 2013
- Citizenship: United Kingdom
- Education: Queen Mary, University of London, City, University of London
- Occupation: Journalist
- Writing career
- Genre: News leaks
- Subjects: Human rights violations, global surveillance and security

Sarah Harrison is a British former WikiLeaks section editor. She worked with the WikiLeaks' legal defence and has been described as Julian Assange's closest adviser. Harrison accompanied National Security Agency whistleblower Edward Snowden on a high-profile flight from Hong Kong to Moscow while he was sought by the United States government.

== Early life ==
Sarah Harrison grew up with two younger sisters and attended a private school in Kent, England. Her father, Ian Harrison, was an executive in the retail industry and her mother was a specialist in treating reading disabilities.

Harrison studied English at Queen Mary, University of London. In 2008, she took an internship at the nonprofit Centre for Investigative Journalism. In late 2009, she met Gavin MacFadyen while applying for an unpaid internship, who recommended her to WikiLeaks the next year. In 2010, she received a junior research position at the Bureau of Investigative Journalism in 2010.

== WikiLeaks ==
As an intern at the UK-based Centre for Investigative Journalism, Harrison began working with WikiLeaks in August 2010 and was assigned to Julian Assange before the Afghan War documents leak. The job was supposed to last two weeks, but evolved into a full staff position.

After Daniel Domscheit-Berg left WikiLeaks over a dispute with Assange, Harrison's role in the organisation increased, particularly with the US diplomatic cables leak and Assange's legal fight against Swedish extradition. She worked with the WikiLeaks' legal defence led by Baltasar Garzón and Julian Assange's personal legal battles to avoid extradition to Sweden, and was Assange's girlfriend, closest adviser and gatekeeper. In 2014, Harrison spoke about her support for WikiLeaks, saying "the greatest unaccountable power of today [is] the United States and our Western democracies."

Harrison is a former WikiLeaks section editor. Harrison also served as acting director of Courage Foundation, a UK trust to support whistleblowers originally cofounded by Julian Assange as the Journalistic Source Protection Defence Fund, from 2014 until April 2017, when WikiLeaks became a Courage beneficiary.

=== Edward Snowden ===
On June 23, 2013, National Security Agency leaker Edward Snowden boarded a commercial Aeroflot flight, SU213, to Moscow, accompanied by Harrison of WikiLeaks, with an intended final destination of Ecuador due to an Ecuadorian emergency travel document that Snowden had acquired. However Snowden became initially stranded in Russia upon his landing in Moscow when his U.S. passport was revoked. On 24 June 2013, WikiLeaks said that Harrison accompanied Snowden on a high-profile flight from Hong Kong to Moscow en route to political asylum from US extradition.

Dominic Rushe of The Guardian observed that Harrison was a "strange choice" because of her lack of legal qualifications compared to other WikiLeaks staff, such as human rights lawyer Jennifer Robinson. At the time, Harrison had been with the organisation for over two years. On 1 August 2013, she accompanied Snowden out of Moscow's Sheremetyevo International Airport after he was granted a year of temporary asylum.

=== Exile from UK ===
In 2014, Harrison said she was living in exile in Berlin because she had received legal advice that she would very likely be detained under Schedule 7 of the UK's Terrorism Act on entry to the UK. Under the Act she could be asked to provide information about WikiLeaks’ and Snowden's sources and refusal to answer would be a crime. After an appeal ruling in January 2016, journalists were exempt from Schedule 7 and she visited London in September 2016.

== Award ==
Harrison received the Willy Brandt Peace Prize in 2015.
