= WikiLeaks =

News leak publishing organisation

- The logo of WikiLeaks; an hourglass with a globe leaking from top to bottom

- Screenshot Screenshot of WikiLeaks' main page as of March 2025
- Website type: Document archive and disclosure
- Available in: English (Note: The source documents are in their original language)
- Owner: Sunshine Press
- Founder: Julian Assange
- Key people: Julian Assange (director); Kristinn Hrafnsson (editor-in-chief); Sarah Harrison (journalist)
- Website: wikileaks.org
- Commercial: No
- Registration: Optional
- Launched: 4 October 2006; 20 years ago

WikiLeaks (/ˈwɪkiˌliːks/) is a non-profit media organisation and publisher of leaked documents from whistleblowers. It is funded by donations and media partnerships. It has published classified documents and other media provided by anonymous sources. It was founded in 2006 by Julian Assange. Kristinn Hrafnsson is its editor-in-chief. Its website states that it has released more than ten million documents and associated analyses. WikiLeaks' most recent publication of original documents was in 2019, and its most recent publication was in 2021. From November 2022, numerous documents on the organisation's website became inaccessible. In 2023, Assange said that WikiLeaks was no longer able to publish due to his imprisonment and the effect that US government surveillance and WikiLeaks' funding restrictions were having on potential whistleblowers.

WikiLeaks has released document caches and media that exposed serious violations of human rights and civil liberties by various governments. It released footage of the 12 July 2007 Baghdad airstrike, titling it Collateral Murder, in which Iraqi Reuters journalists and several other civilians were killed by a US helicopter crew. It published thousands of US military field logs from the war in Afghanistan and Iraq war, diplomatic cables from the United States and Saudi Arabia, and emails from the governments of Syria and Turkey. WikiLeaks has also published documents exposing corruption in Kenya, the Icelandic fishing company Samherji’s use of bribery to take advantage of quotas intended to protect the recovering Nambian fish population from further exploitation by foreign companies (fishrot files), cyber warfare and surveillance tools created by the CIA, and surveillance of the French president by the US National Security Agency (NSA).

During the 2016 US presidential election campaign, WikiLeaks released emails from the Democratic National Committee (DNC) and from Hillary Clinton's campaign manager, showing that the party's national committee had effectively acted as an arm of the Clinton campaign during the primaries, seeking to undercut the campaign of popular democratic socialist rival Bernie Sanders. These releases resulted in the resignation of the chairwoman of the DNC and caused significant harm to the Clinton campaign.

WikiLeaks has won numerous awards and been commended by media organisations, civil society organisations, and world leaders for exposing state and corporate secrets, increasing transparency, assisting freedom of the press, and enhancing democratic discourse while challenging powerful institutions. The organisation has been the target of campaigns to discredit it, including aborted ones by Palantir and HBGary. WikiLeaks has also had its donation systems interrupted by payment processors. In response, the Wau Holland Foundation helps process WikiLeaks' donations.

The organisation has been criticised for inadequately curating content and violating personal privacy. WikiLeaks has, for instance, revealed Social Security numbers, medical information, credit card numbers and details of suicide attempts. News organisations, activists, journalists and former members have criticised WikiLeaks over allegations of anti-Clinton and pro-Trump bias and a lack of internal transparency. Some journalists have alleged it had associations with the Russian government. Journalists have also criticised the organisation for promotion of conspiracy theories, and what they describe as exaggerated and misleading descriptions of the contents of leaks. The CIA and United States Congress characterised the organisation as a "non-state hostile intelligence service" after the release of CIA tools for hacking consumer electronics in Vault 7.

== History ==
=== Founding ===
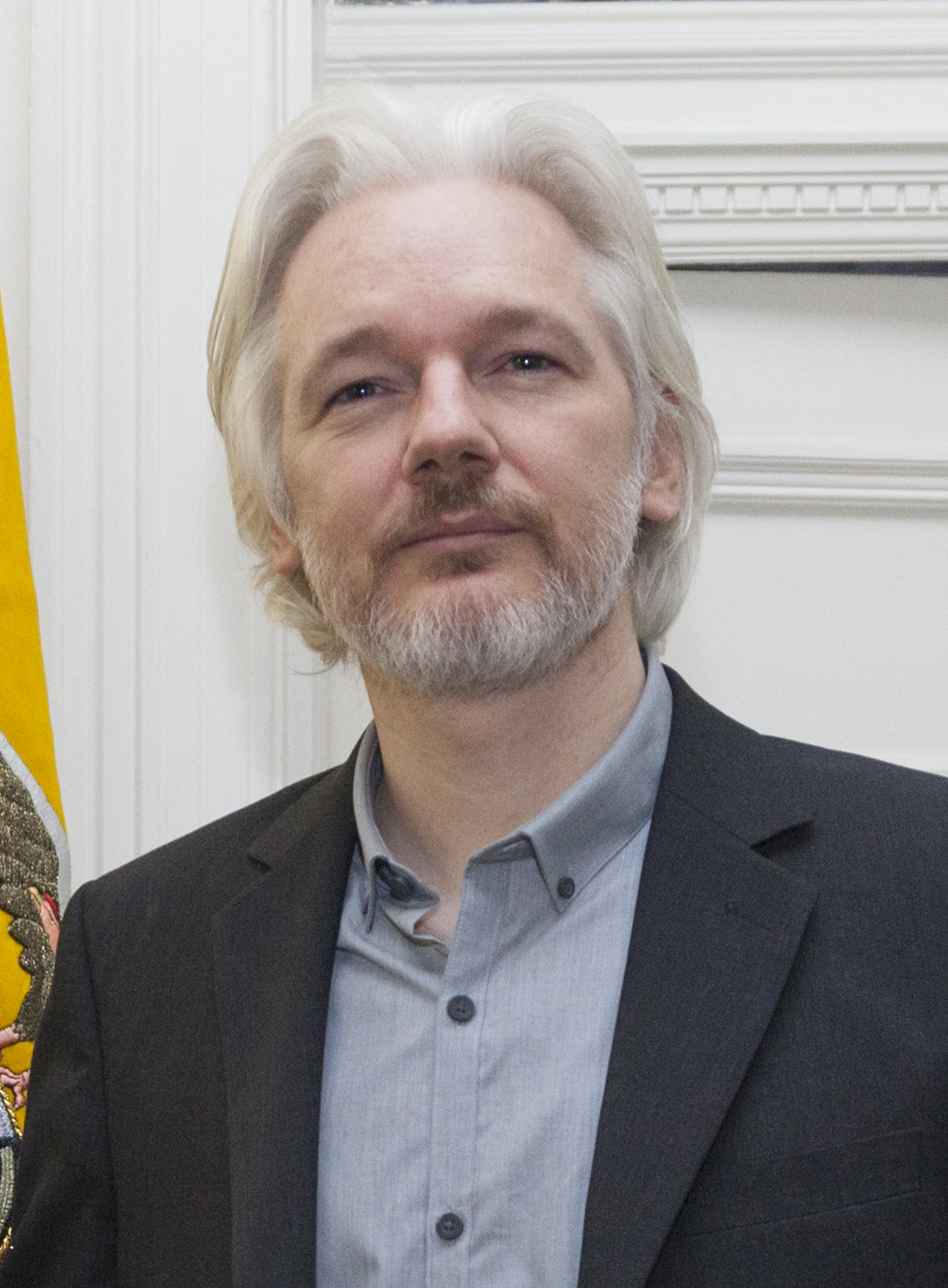
Julian Assange is a founding member of the WikiLeaks staff.

The inspiration for WikiLeaks was Daniel Ellsberg's release of the Pentagon Papers in 1971. Assange built WikiLeaks to shorten the time between a leak and its coverage by the media. WikiLeaks was established in Australia with the help of Daniel Mathews and its servers were soon moved to Sweden and other countries that provided greater legal protection for the media. Assange described WikiLeaks as an activist organisation and said that "The method is transparency, the goal is justice".

The wikileaks.org domain name was registered on 4 October 2006. The website was established and published its first document in December 2006. It described its founders as a mixture of Asian dissidents, journalists, mathematicians, and start-up company technologists from the United States, Taiwan, Europe, Australia, and South Africa. In January 2007 WikiLeaks organiser James Chen told TIME that "We are serious people working on a serious project... three advisors have been detained by Asian government, one of us for over six years." WikiLeaks said that its "primary interests are oppressive regimes in Asia, the former Soviet bloc, sub-Saharan Africa and the Middle East" but it "also expects to be of assistance to those in the West who wish to reveal unethical behaviour in their own governments and corporations". WikiLeaks was usually represented in public by Julian Assange, who has described himself as "the heart and soul of this organisation".

==== Advisory board ====
Assange formed an informal advisory board in the early days of WikiLeaks, with journalists, political activists and computer specialists as members. In 2007 WikiLeaks said the board was still forming but that it included representatives from expatriate Russian and Tibetan refugee communities, reporters, a former US intelligence analyst and cryptographers." Members of the advisory board included Phillip Adams, Julian Assange, Wang Dan, Suelette Dreyfus, CJ Hinke, Tashi Namgyal Khamsitsang, Ben Laurie, Xiao Qiang, Chico Whitaker, Wang Youcai, and John Young.

WikiLeaks' advisory board did not meet. According to Wired UK, most of the board members to whom they spoke said they had little involvement with WikiLeaks. Some said they did not know they were mentioned on the site, nor how they got there. Computer security expert Ben Laurie said he had been a member of the board "since before the beginning", but he was not "really sure what the advisory board means." Former board member Phillip Adams criticised the board, saying that Assange "has never asked for advice. The advisory board was pretty clearly window dressing, so he went for people identified with progressive policies around the place." Assange responded by calling the advisory board "pretty informal".

When asked to join their initial advisory board, the promininent critic of secrecy Steven Aftergood declined; he said to Time that "they have a very idealistic view of the nature of leaking and its impact. They seem to think that most leakers are crusading do-gooders who are single-handedly battling one evil empire or another."

=== Early years ===
In January 2007 John Young was dropped from the WikiLeaks network after questioning plans for a multimillion-dollar fundraising goal. He accused the organisation of being a CIA conduit and published 150 pages of WikiLeaks emails. According to Wired, the emails document the group's attempts to create a profile for themselves and arguments over how to do so. They also discuss political impact and positive reform and include calls for transparency around the world.

In January 2010 WikiLeaks shut down its website while management appealed for donations. Previously published material was no longer available, although some could still be accessed on unofficial mirror websites. WikiLeaks stated that it would resume full operation once the operational costs were paid. WikiLeaks said the work stoppage was "to ensure that everyone who is involved stops normal work and actually spends time raising revenue". The organisation planned for funds to be secured by 6 January 2010, and on 3 February that WikiLeaks announced that its fundraising goal had been achieved.

In February 2010 WikiLeaks helped propose the Icelandic Modern Media Initiative legislation to establish a "journalism safe haven" in Iceland. In June, the parliament voted unanimously for the resolution.

WikiLeaks originally used a wiki format website, and was changed when it relaunched in May 2010. The blogger Ryan Singel claimed that after the website relaunched, its cryptographic security had degraded.

In October 2010 the server WikiLeaks used to host its encrypted communications was compromised by hackers that a WikiLeaks spokesperson described as "very skilled". The spokesperson said that "the server got attacked, hacked, and the private keys got out"; they said it was the first breach in WikiLeaks' history. In November 2010, WikiLeaks said that its website was compromised hours before releasing US diplomatic cables. In December 2010 Spamhaus reported issued a malware warning for "WikiLeaks.info", a "very loosely" affiliated website that "WikiLeaks.org" redirected to. The website said they could "guarantee that there is no malware on it".

=== 2010 internal dissent ===
A series of resignations of key members of WikiLeaks began in September 2010, started by Assange's decision to release the Iraq War logs the next month, internal conflicts with other members and his response to sexual assault allegations. According to Herbert Snorrason, "We found out that the level of redactions performed on the Afghanistan documents was not sufficient. I announced that if the next batch did not receive full attention, I would not be willing to cooperate." Some members of WikiLeaks called for Assange to step aside.

On 25 September 2010 after being suspended by Assange for "disloyalty, insubordination and destabilisation", Daniel Domscheit-Berg, the German spokesman for WikiLeaks, told Der Spiegel that he was resigning. He said "WikiLeaks has a structural problem. I no longer want to take responsibility for it, and that's why I am leaving the project." Assange accused Domscheit-Berg of leaking information to Newsweek, with Domscheit-Berg saying that the WikiLeaks team was unhappy with Assange's management and handling of the Afghan war document releases. Domscheit-Berg said he wanted greater transparency in WikiLeaks finances and the leaks released to the public.

According to various sources, Domscheit-Berg had copied and then deleted over 3,500 unpublished whistleblower communications. Some communications contained hundreds of documents, including the US government's No Fly List, Bank of America leaks, insider information from 20 neo-Nazi organisations, documents sent by Renata Avila about torture and government abuse of a Latin American country and US intercept information for "over a hundred Internet companies". Assange stated that Domscheit-Berg had deleted video files of the Granai massacre by a US Bomber. WikiLeaks had scheduled the video for publication before its deletion. According to Andy Müller-Maguhn, it was an eighteen-gigabyte collection.

Domscheit-Berg said he took the files from WikiLeaks because he did not trust its security. In Domscheit-Berg's book he wrote he was "waiting for Julian to restore security, so that we can return the material to him". The Architect and Domscheit-Berg encrypted the files and gave them to a third party who did not have the key. In August 2011 Domscheit-Berg said he permanently deleted the files "to ensure that the sources are not compromised." He said that WikiLeaks' claims about the Bank of America files were "false and misleading" and they were lost because of an IT problem.

The Architect left with Domscheit-Berg, taking the code behind the submission system with him. WikiLeaks submissions stayed offline until 2015. Herbert Snorrason resigned after he challenged Assange on his decision to suspend Domscheit-Berg and was bluntly rebuked. Iceland MP Birgitta Jónsdóttir also left WikiLeaks, citing lack of transparency, lack of structure, and poor communication flow. James Ball left WikiLeaks over disputes about Assange's handling of finances, and Assange's relationship to Israel Shamir, an individual who has promoted antisemitism and holocaust denial. According to the British newspaper, The Independent, at least a dozen key supporters of WikiLeaks left the website during 2010. Several staffers who broke with Assange joined with Domscheit-Berg to start OpenLeaks, a new leak organisation and website with a different management and distribution philosophy.

Sarah Harrison, who stayed with WikiLeaks, later told Andrew O'Hagan she did not agree with the way he did it, but Domscheit-Berg had a basic point. She added that "you can tell he was probably just trying to say something true and got hated for it. That's the way it is with Julian: he can't listen. He doesn't get it."

=== Actions against WikiLeaks ===
In early 2010 Assange said that he obtained documents showing that two State Department agents tailed him on a flight from Iceland to Norway. Icelandic journalists were unable to verify Assange's allegations, which were denied by the State Department. Assange did not release the alleged documents. Assange also said that a volunteer was arrested in March and questioned about WikiLeaks. According to Assange, police said that authorities had spied on and photographed a private WikiLeaks meeting. WikiLeaks later admitted that the interrogation did not happen as originally suggested. According to the deputy head of news for RUV, the arrest was unrelated to WikiLeaks but the volunteer mentioned WikiLeaks to the police and said the laptop he had with him was owned by WikiLeaks. Daniel Domscheit-Berg wrote that

The rumors that he was being followed originated in part from his overactive imagination. But they also had the advantage of giving him the aura of someone in dire peril, increasing the collective anticipation of every new leak. Julian didn't need a marketing department. Marketing was something he himself knew best.

After Julian Assange was granted asylum and entered the Ecuadorian embassy in London in 2012, new CCTV cameras were installed and security personnel working for UC Global and Promsecurity recorded his activities and interactions, including with his legal team. In a 2017 email, the surveillance was justified with suspicions that Assange was "working for the Russian intelligence services." New cameras and microphones were installed in December 2017, and Morales arranged for the United States to have immediate access to the recordings.

==== Campaigns to discredit WikiLeaks ====
Writing for The Guardian in 2010, Nick Davies said there was "some evidence of low-level attempts to smear Wikileaks", including false online accusations involving Assange and money. In 2010, Wikileaks published a 2008 US military report that said leaks to WikiLeaks "could result in increased threats to DoD personnel, equipment, facilities, or installations". The report suggested a plan to identify and expose WikiLeaks' sources to "deter others from using WikiLeaks" and "destroy the center of gravity" of Wikileaks by attacking its trustworthiness. According to Clint Hendler writing in the Columbia Journalism Review, many reactions to the document were "overwrought" and "the spin" by WikiLeaks was "a step too far".

In 2010 the Bank of America employed the services of a collection of information security firms, known as Team Themis, when the bank became concerned about information that WikiLeaks was planning to release about it. Team Themis included private intelligence and security firms HBGary Federal, Palantir Technologies and Berico Technologies. In 2011 hacktivist group Anonymous released emails from HBGary Federal showing that Team Themis proposed a plan which suggested "[spreading] disinformation" and "disrupting" Glenn Greenwald's support for WikiLeaks. Team Themis planned to expose the workings of WikiLeaks using disinformation and cyberattacks. The plans were not implemented and, after the emails were published, Palantir CEO Alex Karp issued a public apology to "progressive organizations ... and Greenwald" for his company's role.

==== Other ====
In December 2010 PayPal suspended the WikiLeaks account after they received a letter from the US State Department that characterised WikiLeaks' activities as illegal in the US. Mastercard and Visa Europe also stopped accepting payments to WikiLeaks after pressure from the US. Bank of America, Amazon and Swiss bank PostFinance had previously stopped dealing with WikiLeaks. Datacell, the IT company that enabled WikiLeaks to accept credit and debit card donations, said Visa's action was the result of political pressure. WikiLeaks referred to these actions as a banking blockade. In response to the companies' actions, the hacker group Anonymous launched a series of cyberattacks against the companies, and against the Swedish Prosecution Authority for its attempted extradition of Assange. WikiLeaks spokesman Kristinn Hrafnsson said:

[Anonymous] is not affiliated with Wikileaks. There has been no contact between any Wikileaks staffer and anyone at Anonymous. Wikileaks has not received any prior notice of any of Anonymous' actions. We neither condemn nor applaud these attacks. We believe they are a reflection of public opinion on the actions of the targets.

Cyber-attacks and legal restrictions forced WikiLeaks to change server hosts several times by 2010.

=== 2011–2015 ===
In December 2011 WikiLeaks launched Friends of WikiLeaks, a social network for supporters and founders of the website. Friends of WikiLeaks was designed for users to never have more than 12 friends, half local and half international. The site was in beta status.

In July 2012 WikiLeaks took credit for a fake New York Times website and article falsely attributed to Bill Keller. The hoax prompted criticism from commenters and the public, who said it hurt WikiLeaks' credibility. Glenn Greenwald wrote in Salon that it might have been satire but

it doesn't strike me as a good idea for a group that relies on its credibility when it comes to the authenticity of what they publish – and which thus far has had a stellar record in that regard – to be making boastful claims that they published forged documents. I understand and appreciate the satire, but in this case, it directly conflicts with, and undermines, the primary value of WikiLeaks.

WikiLeaks said it wanted to bring attention to the banking blockade.

In January 2013, shortly after Aaron Swartz died, WikiLeaks said that Swartz had helped WikiLeaks and had talked to Julian Assange in 2010 and 2011. WikiLeaks also said it had "strong reasons to believe, but cannot prove", he may have been a source, breaking WikiLeaks' rules about source anonymity. Journalists suggested that Wikileaks may have made the statements to imply that Swartz was targeted by the US Attorney's Office and Secret Service in order to get at WikiLeaks.

In 2013 the organisation assisted Edward Snowden leave Hong Kong. Sarah Harrison, a WikiLeaks activist, accompanied Snowden on the flight. According to US investigators, WikiLeaks played an active role in assisting Snowden to disclose a cache of NSA documents. Scott Shane of The New York Times stated that the involvement "shows that despite its shoestring staff, limited fund-raising from a boycott by major financial firms, and defections prompted by Mr. Assange's personal troubles and abrasive style, it remains a force to be reckoned with on the global stage."

In September 2013 Julian Assange announced the creation of the WikiLeaks counterintelligence unit. The project surveilled 19 surveillance contractors to understand their business dealings. According to Assange, they were "tracking the trackers" to "counter threats against investigative journalism and the public's right to know."

The WikiLeaks Party was created in 2013 in part to support Julian Assange's failed bid for a Senate seat in Australia in the 2013 election, where it won 0.62% of the national vote. Assange said the party would advance WikiLeaks' objectives of promoting openness in government and politics and that it would combat intrusions on individual privacy. In December 2013, a delegation from the party, including its chairman John Shipton, visited Syria and met with President Bashar al-Assad. Shipton said the goal of the meeting was demonstrating "solidarity with the Syrian people and their nation", improving the party's understanding of the country's civil war and told a Syrian TV station that WikiLeaks would be opening an office in Damascus in 2014. The meeting with Assad was criticised by the Australian Prime Minister, Foreign Minister and many WikiLeaks supporters. Shipton stated that the meeting with al-Assad was "just a matter of good manners" and that the delegation had also met with members of the Syrian opposition. However, these meetings with the opposition have not been verified. The WikiLeaks Party was deregistered by the Australian Electoral Commission on 23 July 2015 for lack of members under the Electoral Act.

In 2015 WikiLeaks began issuing "bounties" of up to $100,000 for leaks. Assange had said in 2010 that WikiLeaks didn't but "would have no problem giving sources cash" and that there were systems in Belgium to let them. WikiLeaks has issued crowd-sourced rewards for the TTIP chapters, the TPP and information on the Kunduz massacre. WikiLeaks has issued other bounties for LabourLeaks, 2016 U.S. presidential election-related information, and information to get a reporter at The Intercept fired over the Reality Winner case. WikiLeaks has defended the practice with their vetting record, saying "police rewards produce results. So do journalistic rewards."

Its website stated in 2015 that it had released 10 million documents online.

=== 2016 U.S. presidential election ===
Assange wrote on WikiLeaks in February 2016: "I have had years of experience in dealing with Hillary Clinton and have read thousands of her cables. Hillary lacks judgement and will push the United States into endless, stupid wars which spread terrorism. ... she certainly should not become president of the United States." In a 2017 interview by Amy Goodman, Julian Assange said that choosing between Hillary Clinton and Donald Trump is like choosing between cholera or gonorrhea. "Personally, I would prefer neither." WikiLeaks editor Sarah Harrison stated that the site was not choosing which damaging publications to release, rather releasing information available to them. In conversations that were leaked in February 2018, Assange expressed a preference for a Republican victory in the 2016 election, saying that "Dems+Media+liberals would then form a block to reign in their worst qualities. With Hillary in charge, GOP will be pushing for her worst qualities, dems+media+neoliberals will be mute. She's a bright, well connected, sadistic sociopath".

Having released information about a broad range of organisations and politicians, WikiLeaks started by 2016 to focus almost exclusively on Democratic presidential candidate Hillary Clinton. In the 2016 U.S. presidential election, WikiLeaks only exposed material damaging to the Democratic National Committee and Hillary Clinton. According to The New York Times, WikiLeaks timed one of its large leaks so that it would happen on the eve of the Democratic Convention. The Sunlight Foundation said that such actions meant that WikiLeaks was no longer striving to be transparent but rather sought to achieve political goals.

Thomas Joscelyn, a senior fellow at Just Security, wrote that Assange had a "hatred of Clinton", whom he said was a "sadistic sociopath". Joscelyn wrote that "WikiLeaks' collusion with Russian government hackers during the 2016 presidential campaign" was "arguably even more consequential" than the Iraq War documents leak, the Afghan War documents leak and the United States diplomatic cables leak. According to Joscelyn, "Assange made it his goal in 2016 to counter the 'American liberal press,' which he accused of supporting Clinton. He aimed to turn that same press against her. Ultimately, with Russia's help, Assange succeeded."

==== Secret correspondence between WikiLeaks and Donald Trump Jr. ====
In November 2017 it was revealed that the WikiLeaks Twitter account secretly corresponded with Donald Trump Jr. during the 2016 presidential election. The correspondence shows how WikiLeaks actively solicited the co-operation of Trump Jr., a campaign surrogate and advisor in the campaign of his father. WikiLeaks urged the Trump campaign to reject the results of the 2016 presidential election at a time when it looked as if the Trump campaign would lose. WikiLeaks asked Trump Jr. to share a WikiLeaks tweet with the made-up quote "Can't we just drone this guy?" which True Pundit said Hillary Clinton made about Assange. WikiLeaks also shared a link to a site that would help people to search through WikiLeaks documents. Trump Jr. shared both. After the election, WikiLeaks also requested that the president-elect push Australia to appoint Assange as ambassador to the US. Trump Jr. provided this correspondence to congressional investigators looking into Russian interference in the 2016 election. Assange repeated his offer of being ambassador to the US after the messages became public, publicly tweeting to Donald Trump Jr. that "I could open a hotel style embassy in DC with luxury immunity suites for whistleblowers. The public will get a turbo-charged flow of intel about the latest CIA plots to undermine democracy. DM me."

The secretive exchanges led to criticism of WikiLeaks by some former supporters. WikiLeaks tweeted that the Clinton campaign was "constantly slandering" it as "a 'pro-Trump' 'pro-Russia' source". Journalist Barrett Brown, a long-time defender of WikiLeaks, was exasperated that Assange was "complaining about 'slander' of being pro-Trump IN THE ACTUAL COURSE OF COLLABORATING WITH TRUMP". He wrote: "Was 'Wikileaks staff' lying on Nov 10, 2016, when they claimed, 'The allegations that we have colluded with Trump, or any other candidate for that matter, or with Russia, are just groundless and false', or did Assange lie to them?" Brown said Assange had acted "as a covert political operative", thus betraying WikiLeaks' focus on exposing "corporate and government wrongdoing".

==== Promotion of false conspiracy theories ====
In 2016 and 2017, WikiLeaks promoted several false conspiracy theories, most related to the 2016 United States presidential election.

===== Murder of Seth Rich =====
WikiLeaks promoted conspiracy theories about the murder of Seth Rich. Unfounded conspiracy theories, spread by some right-wing figures and media outlets, hold that Rich was the source of leaked emails and was killed for working with WikiLeaks. WikiLeaks fuelled such theories when it offered a $20,000 reward for information on Rich's killer and when Assange implied that Rich was the source of the DNC leaks, although no evidence supports that. Special Counsel Robert Mueller's report into Russian interference in the 2016 election said that Assange "implied falsely" that Rich was the source in order to obscure that Russia was the actual source.

===== Democratic Party and Hillary Clinton =====
WikiLeaks popularised conspiracy theories about the Democratic Party and Hillary Clinton, such as tweeting articles which suggested Clinton campaign chairman John Podesta engaged in satanic rituals, claiming that Hillary Clinton wanted to drone strike Assange, suggesting that Clinton wore earpieces to debates and interviews, promoting thinly sourced theories about Clinton's health and according to Bloomberg creating "anti-Clinton theories out of whole cloth".

===== Promotion of false flag theories =====
On the day the Vault 7 documents were first released, WikiLeaks described UMBRAGE as "a substantial library of attack techniques 'stolen' from malware produced in other states including the Russian Federation," and tweeted, "CIA steals other groups virus and malware facilitating false flag attacks." A conspiracy theory soon emerged alleging that the CIA framed the Russian government for interfering in the 2016 U.S. elections. Conservative commentators such as Sean Hannity and Ann Coulter speculated about this possibility on Twitter, and Rush Limbaugh discussed it on his radio show. Russian foreign minister Sergey Lavrov said that Vault 7 showed that "the CIA could get access to such 'fingerprints' and then use them."

In The Washington Post the cybersecurity researcher Ben Buchanan writes that he is sceptical of those theories and that he believes Russia to have initially obtained the DNC emails.

In April 2017 the WikiLeaks Twitter account suggested that the Khan Shaykhun chemical attack, which international human rights organisations attributed to the Syrian government, was a false flag attack. WikiLeaks stated that "while western establishment media beat the drum for more war in Syria the matter is far from clear", and shared a video by a Syrian activist who said that Islamist extremists were probably behind the attack, not the Syrian government.

=== Later years ===
In 2016 the WikiLeaks Twitter account was criticised for tweets that were seen as antisemitic.

On 17 October 2016 WikiLeaks announced that a "state party" had severed the Internet connection of Julian Assange at the Ecuadorian embassy. WikiLeaks blamed US Secretary of State John Kerry for pressuring the Ecuadorian government in severing Assange's Internet, an accusation which the United States State Department denied. The Ecuadorian government stated that it had "temporarily" severed Assange's Internet connection because of WikiLeaks' release of documents "impacting on the U.S. election campaign," although it also stated that this was not meant to prevent WikiLeaks from operating. The United States Senate Select Committee on Intelligence concluded that in 2016, "WikiLeaks actively sought, and played, a key role in the Russian influence campaign and very likely knew it was assisting a Russian intelligence influence effort."

In April 2017 Attorney General Jeff Sessions said that the US Government had prioritised its attempts to arrest Assange. On 16 August 2017 US Republican congressman Dana Rohrabacher visited Assange and told him that Trump would pardon him on condition that he would agree to say that Russia was not involved in the 2016 Democratic National Committee email leaks. At his extradition hearings in 2020, Assange's defence team alleged in court that this offer was made "on instructions from the president". Trump and Rohrabacher subsequently said they had never spoken about the offer and Rohrabacher said he had made the offer on his own initiative.

In 2017, traffic to the WikiLeaks website was diverted by DNS hijacking. In 2018, 11,000 messages from a private chat with WikiLeaks and key supporters from May 2015 through November 2017 was leaked. The messages showed Assange criticising Hillary Clinton and expressing a desire for a Republican president because he believed Clinton would have "a greater freedom to start wars than the GOP and has a will to do so". Later that year, "tens of thousands" of files from WikiLeaks laptops was leaked to the Associated Press.

In January 2019, WikiLeaks sent journalists a "confidential legal communication not for publication" with a list of 140 things not to say about Julian Assange that WikiLeaks said were "false and defamatory". Soon after the list was leaked online, WikiLeaks posted a heavily edited version of it. The group was criticised and mocked for the list and their handling of it.

In November 2022, much of the content released by WikiLeaks disappeared from the website, bringing the number of documents from around 10 million to around 3,000. Other reported issues with the site included the websites search ability not working and a broken submission page.

== Administration ==
WikiLeaks describes itself as "an uncensorable system for untraceable mass document leaking" with its goal being "to bring important news and information to the public". It is "a project of the Sunshine Press", a non-profit organisation based in Iceland. In 2010, Julian Assange and Kristinn Hrafnsson registered Sunshine Press Productions ehf as a business without a headquarters in Iceland.

Assange serves as the Director of Sunshine Press Productions ehf and is on the board of directors with Hrafnsson and Ingi Ragnar Ingason. Gavin MacFadyen was a deputy board member. In 2010, the WikiLeaks team then consisted of five people working full-time and about 800 people who worked occasionally, none of whom were compensated. Former WikiLeaks journalist James Ball said in 2011 that "WikiLeaks is not a conventional organisation. It has no board, no governance, and no effective rules."

=== Editorial policy ===
The scholar and internet activist Ethan Zuckerman suggested that WikiLeaks' editorial policy changes can be viewed as different stages. In the first stage, Zuckerman says WikiLeaks did very little redacting and almost all leaks were accepted, and the main focus was on leakers protecting their identities. In response to early criticism that having no editorial policy would drive out good material with spam and promote "automated or indiscriminate publication of confidential records", WikiLeaks established a policy that only accepted only documents "of political, diplomatic, historical or ethical interest" (and excluded "material that is already publicly available"). Under the new policy, submissions are reviewed by anonymous WikiLeaks reviewers, and documents that do not meet the editorial criteria are rejected. By 2008, the revised FAQ stated: "Anybody can post comments to it. [...] Users can publicly discuss documents and analyse their credibility and veracity." After the 2010 reorganisation, posting new comments on leaks was no longer possible.

According to Zuckerman, the second stage was "an advocacy journalism phase". Zuckerman gave the 2010 release of Collateral Murder as an example, which MIT Technology Review described as a "highly curated, produced and packaged political statement ... meant to illustrate a political point of view, not merely to inform". Zuckerman said the third stage involved WikiLeaks working with outside media outlets to curate cables for release. In December 2010, Zuckerman speculated that the next stage would be for WikiLeaks to release documents all at once or without redacting them. In 2016, Assange said that "often it's the case that we have to do a lot of exploration and marketing of the material we publish ourselves to get a big political impact for it".

An embargo agreement WikiLeaks made for the Stratfor leak aimed to ensure that media organisations in smaller countries with less resources that are collaborating with WikiLeaks got a fair shot at covering the stories that involve their country. The Atlantic suggested that the complexity of the embargo had been a source of confusion among media partners. In 2017, WikiLeaks told Foreign Policy that it sometimes scheduled releases around high-profile events.

In response to a question in 2010 about whether WikiLeaks would release information that he knew might get someone killed, Assange said that he had instituted a "harm-minimization policy". This meant that people named in some documents might be contacted before publication, but that there were also instances where members of WikiLeaks might have "blood on our hands." One member of WikiLeaks told The New Yorker they were initially uncomfortable with Assange's editorial policy but changed her mind because she thought no one had been unjustly harmed.

==== Response ====
In an August 2010 open letter, the non-governmental organisation Reporters Without Borders praised WikiLeaks' past usefulness in exposing "serious violations of human rights and civil liberties" but criticised the organisation over a perceived absence of editorial control.

In a 2013 resolution, the International Federation of Journalists, a trade union of journalists, called WikiLeaks a "new breed of media organisation".

Others do not consider WikiLeaks to be journalistic in nature. Media ethicist Kelly McBride of the Poynter Institute for Media Studies wrote in 2011: "WikiLeaks might grow into a journalist endeavor. But it's not there yet." Bill Keller of The New York Times considers WikiLeaks to be a "complicated source" rather than a journalistic partner. Prominent First Amendment lawyer Floyd Abrams writes that WikiLeaks is not a journalistic organisation, but instead "an organization of political activists; ... a source for journalists; and ... a conduit of leaked information to the press and the public".

=== Financing ===
WikiLeaks is a not-for-profit organisation and is funded by private donations, exclusivity contracts and concessions from their media partners. Assange has said that in some cases legal aid has been donated by media organisations such as the Associated Press, the Los Angeles Times, and the National Newspaper Publishers Association. Assange said in early 2010 that WikiLeaks' only revenue consists of donations, but it has considered other options including auctioning early access to documents. In September 2010, Assange said that WikiLeaks received millions of dollars in media partnerships, stating it "win[s] concessions in relation to the number of journalists that will be put on it and how big they'll run with it."

In 2010, Assange said the organisation was registered as a library in Australia, a foundation in France, and a newspaper in Sweden, and that it also used two US-based non-profit 501c3 organisations for funding purposes. According to Daniel Domscheit-Berg, Assange registered Wikileaks ICT in Australia and would not tell anyone how much money was in the Australian fund or what it was being spent on.

==== 2010–2013 ====
The Wau Holland Foundation, one of the WikiLeaks' main funding channels, stated that it received more than €900,000 in public donations between October 2009 and December 2010, of which €370,000 has been passed on to WikiLeaks. Hendrik Fulda, vice-president of the Wau Holland Foundation, said that every new WikiLeaks publication brought "a wave of support", and that donations were strongest in the weeks after WikiLeaks started publishing leaked diplomatic cables. According to Assange, WikiLeaks' media partnerships for the cables earned them almost $2 million three months after it started publishing. WikiLeaks was paid £150,000 by Al Jazeera and Channel 4 for two five-minute video clips about the Iraq War Logs. In December 2010, Assange said that WikiLeaks received €100,000 a day at its peak and the Wau Holland Foundation stated that Julian Assange and three other permanent employees had begun to receive salaries.

During 2010, WikiLeaks received over $1.9 million in donations. In 2011 donations dropped sharply and WikiLeaks received only around $180,000 in donations, while their expenses increased from $519,000 to $850,000. Al Jazeera offered WikiLeaks $1.3 million for access to data. During September 2011 WikiLeaks began auctioning items on eBay to raise funds. Wikileaks started accepting bitcoin in 2011 as a currency which could not be blocked by financial institutions or a government. In 2012, WikiLeaks raised $68,000 through the Wau Holland Foundation and had expenses more than $507,000. Between January and May, Wau Holland Foundation was only able to cover $47,000 in essential infrastructure for WikiLeaks, but not an additional $400,000 that was submitted "to cover publishing campaigns and logistics in 2012".

David Allen Green wrote in The New Statesman in 2011 that there was "no other sensible way of interpreting" leaked non-disclosure agreements other than WikliLeaks seeing itself "as a commercial organisation in the business of owning and selling leaked information". Becky Hogge, who had signed the agreement, wrote that "the NDA certainly is poorly drafted, and it may be terrible PR. But remember that WikiLeaks is an organisation conceived and run by computer hackers" and suggested that WikiLeaks was attempting to "engage with the commercial media on its own terms".

==== Financial blockade ====
On 22 January 2010, the Internet payment intermediary PayPal suspended WikiLeaks' account and froze its assets. WikiLeaks said that this had happened before, and was done for "no obvious reason". In August 2010, the internet payment company Moneybookers closed WikiLeaks' account and sent Assange letters saying the account was closed following an audit "to comply with money laundering or other investigations conducted by government authorities." According to Moneybookers, initially the "account was suspended due to being accessed from a blacklisted IP address. However, following recent publicity and the subsequently addition of the WikiLeaks entity to blacklists in Australia and watchlists in the USA, we have terminated the business relationship." The blacklisting came a few days after the Pentagon expressed anger at WikiLeaks for publishing the Afghan War logs.

In December 2010, PayPal suspended WikiLeaks' account. PayPal said it had taken action after the US State Department sent a letter to Wikileaks stating that Wikileaks' activities were illegal in the US. Hendrik Fulda, vice-president of the Wau Holland Foundation, said that the Foundation had been receiving twice as many donations through PayPal as through normal banks before PayPal's decision to suspend WikiLeaks' account. In this time, Mastercard, Visa Europe, Bank of America, Amazon, Western Union and Swiss bank PostFinance stopped dealing with WikiLeaks. Datacell, the IT company that enabled WikiLeaks to accept credit and debit card donations, threatened Mastercard and Visa with legal action to enforce the resumption of payments to WikiLeaks. Datacell said Visa's action was the result of political pressure.

In October 2011 Assange said that the financial censorship had cost WikiLeaks ninety-five per cent of its revenue. In 2012, an Icelandic district court ruled that Valitor, the Icelandic partner of Visa and MasterCard, was violating the law when it stopped accepting donations to WikiLeaks and that donations to WikiLeaks must resume within 14 days or Valitor would be fined US$6,000 a day. In November 2012, the European Union's European Commission said Mastercard and Visa were unlikely to have violated EU anti-trust rules. In 2013, Assange said the blockade also effected the WikiLeaks Party.

In response to the financial blockade of Wikileaks, Glenn Greenwald and others created the Freedom of the Press Foundation "to block the US government from ever again being able to attack and suffocate an independent journalistic enterprise the way it did with WikiLeaks". Anonymous also launched a series of cyberattacks against companies that cut ties with WikiLeaks.

==== 2014–2018 ====
In 2014, Sunshine Press Productions ehf began receiving funds from Wau Holland Foundation for WikiLeaks. From 2014 to 2017 WikiLeaks was reimbursed for project coordination, technical preparation, removing metadata, reviewing information, communicating with media partners costs and a new submission platform and document search. The DNC emails and Podesta emails were not funded by the Wau Holland Foundation. In October 2017, Julian Assange said WikiLeaks had made a 50,000% return on Bitcoin. By that December, it had raised at least $25 million in Bitcoin.

In 2018, the Wau Holland Foundation reimbursed Sunshine Press Productions for WikiLeaks' publications, as well as public relations and $50,000 for legal expenses in the Democratic National Committee v. Russian Federation lawsuit.

=== Hosting ===
In 2010, the website was available on multiple servers, different domain names and had an official dark web version as a result of a number of denial-of-service attacks and its removal from different Domain Name System (DNS) providers.

Until August 2010, WikiLeaks was hosted by PRQ, a Swedish company providing "highly secure, no-questions-asked hosting services". PRQ was reported by The Register to have "almost no information about its clientele and maintains few if any of its own logs". That month, WikiLeaks reached an agreement with the Swedish Pirate Party to host several of their servers. Later, WikiLeaks was hosted mainly by the Swedish Internet service provider Bahnhof in the Pionen facility, a former nuclear bunker in Sweden. Other servers were spread around the world with the main server located in Sweden.

After the site became the target of a denial-of-service attack, WikiLeaks moved its website to Amazon's servers. Amazon later removed the website. Assange said that WikiLeaks chose Amazon and other hosts knowing it would probably be kicked off the service "to separate rhetoric from reality". In a public statement, Amazon said WikiLeaks was not following its terms of service. The company stated:

There were several parts they were violating. For example, our terms of service state that 'you represent and warrant that you own or otherwise control all of the rights to the content ... that use of the content you supply does not violate this policy and will not cause injury to any person or entity.' It's clear that WikiLeaks doesn't own or otherwise control all the rights to this classified content.

WikiLeaks then moved to servers at French provider OVH. After criticism from the French government, a judge in Paris ruled that there was no need for OVH to cease hosting WikiLeaks without more information.

WikiLeaks was dropped by EveryDNS after distributed denial-of-service (DDoS) attacks against WikiLeaks hurt the quality of service for its other customers. Supporters of WikiLeaks waged verbal and DDoS attacks on EveryDNS. Because of a typographical error in blogs mistaking EveryDNS for competitor EasyDNS, the sizeable Internet backlash hit EasyDNS. Despite that, EasyDNS began providing WikiLeaks with DNS service on "two 'battle hardened' servers" to protect the quality of service for its other customers.

=== Insurance files ===
WikiLeaks has used heavily encrypted files to protect their publications against censorship, to pre-release publications, and as protection against arrest. The files have been described as "insurance", a "dead man's switch", "a kind of doomsday option", and a "poison pill". The insurance files sometimes come with pre-commitment hashes.

WikiLeaks staff have said:

insurance files are encrypted copies of unpublished documents submitted to us. We do this periodically, and especially at moments of high pressure on us, to ensure the documents can not be lost and history preserved. You will not be able to see the contents of any of our insurance files, until and unless the we are in a position where we must release the key. But you can download them and help spread them to ensure their safe keeping.

On 29 July 2010 WikiLeaks added an AES encrypted "Insurance file" to the Afghan War Diary page. There has been speculation that it was intended to serve as insurance in case the WikiLeaks website or its spokesman Julian Assange are incapacitated, upon which the passphrase could be published. After the release of the US diplomatic cables, CBS predicted that "If anything happens to Assange or the website, a key will go out to unlock the files. There would then be no way to stop the information from spreading like wildfire because so many people already have copies." Assange's lawyer, Mark Stephens, called the files "a thermo-nuclear device in the information age" and said they included information on Guantanamo Bay, aerial video of a U.S. airstrike in Afghanistan that allegedly killed civilians, BP reports and Bank of America documents.

In August 2013, WikiLeaks posted three insurance files as torrents, totalling 400 gigabytes. WikiLeaks said it "encrypted versions of upcoming publication data ("insurance") from time to time to nullify attempts at prior restraint."

In June 2016, WikiLeaks posted an 88-gigabyte insurance file. On 16 October 2016, WikiLeaks tweeted an insurance file about Ecuador. In November, it posted insurance files for the US, the UK and Ecuador, and an unlabelled 90-gigabyte insurance file was posted.

On 7 March 2017, WikiLeaks posted an encrypted file containing the Vault 7 Year Zero release. The password, "SplinterItIntoAThousandPiecesAndScatterItIntoTheWinds", was a reference to a quote by US President John F. Kennedy.

=== Staff ===
In July 2010, it was reported the website had 800 occasional helpers. According to Daniel Domscheit-Berg, WikiLeaks exaggerated the number of volunteers and Assange used many pseudonyms. Domscheit-Berg suggested that Assange may have been "Jay Lim", who identified online as an occasional WikiLeaks spokesperson and as its legal advisor.

Daniel Domscheit-Berg, Sarah Harrison, Kristinn Hrafnsson and Joseph Farrell have been involved in the project. Gavin MacFadyen was acknowledged by Assange as a "beloved director of WikiLeaks" shortly after his death in 2016. Jacob Appelbaum is the only known American member of WikiLeaks, acting as a senior editor and spokesman. Gottfrid Svartholm had worked with WikiLeaks as a technical consultant and managed critical infrastructure. He was also listed as part of the "decryption and transmission team" on Collateral Murder and credited for "networking" and helped with several other endeavours. Rop Gonggrijp, Birgitta Jónsdóttir, Smári McCarthy and Herbert Snorrason are WikiLeaks volunteers and members who the US government has tried to surveil with court orders. WikiLeaks was represented in Russia by Israel Shamir and in Sweden by his son Johannes Wahlström.

The WikiLeaks dropbox architecture was rebuilt by a WikiLeaks programmer known to most insiders as "The Architect". He also instructed another WikiLeaks technician, and some of his colleagues thought he was a computer genius. According to Andy Greenberg, insiders told him "when The Architect joined WikiLeaks it was a mess. It was two creaking servers without all the flashy security that Assange had promised in interviews with the media. The Architect rebuilt it from scratch." According to Wired, "WikiLeaks had been running on a single server with sensitive backend components like the submission and e-mail archives connected to the public-facing Wiki page. The Architect separated the platforms and set up a number of servers in various countries."

In August 2011 WikiLeaks volunteer Sigurdur Thordarson became the first FBI informant to work from inside WikiLeaks, and gave the FBI several hard drives he had copied from Assange and core WikiLeaks members. In November 2011 WikiLeaks dismissed Thordarson due to his embezzlement of $50,000, to which charge (along with several other offences) he later pleaded guilty in an Icelandic court.

Alexa O'Brien briefly worked for WikiLeaks in 2014, later saying the organisation was not a good fit. On 26 September 2018, it was announced that Julian Assange had appointed Kristinn Hrafnsson as editor-in-chief of WikiLeaks with Assange continuing as its publisher.

=== Submissions ===
WikiLeaks restructured its process for contributions after its first document leaks did not gain much attention. Assange stated this was part of an attempt to take the voluntary effort typically seen in Wiki projects and "redirect it to ... material that has real potential for change". Before this, the Wikileaks FAQ, under "How will Wikileaks operate?", read as of February 2007:

To the user, Wikileaks will look very much like Wikipedia. Anybody can post to it, anybody can edit it. No technical knowledge is required. Leakers can post documents anonymously and untraceably. Users can publicly discuss documents and analyze their credibility and veracity.

WikiLeaks stopped using a "wiki" communal publication method by May 2010. After the arrest of Chelsea Manning in May 2010, WikiLeaks distanced itself from the idea it actively encouraged people to send classified information, and changed the description of its submission page to say "WikiLeaks accepts a range of material, but we do not solicit it". WikiLeaks removed "classified" from a description of material it accepts and changed the assertion that "submitting confidential material to WikiLeaks is safe, easy and protected by law" to it "is protected by law in better democracies". WikiLeaks also began taking steps to position itself as a news organisation, and portrayed their work as filtering and analysing documents, not just posting them raw.

In 2010 Assange said WikiLeaks received some submissions through the postal mail. That year, Julian Assange said that the servers were located in Sweden and the other countries "specifically because those nations offer legal protection to the disclosures made on the site". He said the Swedish constitution gives the information–providers total legal protection and that it is forbidden for any administrative authority to make inquiries about the sources of any type of newspaper. This could make it difficult for any authority to target WikiLeaks by placing a burden of proof upon any complainant. According to the Columbia Journalism Review, "a variety of Swedish media law experts made it clear that Assange and WikiLeaks had repeatedly misrepresented not only the strength of the law, but its application to WikiLeaks."

According to Andy Greenberg and Wired, The Architect was the engineer who rebuilt the WikiLeaks submission system, separated the sensitive platforms from the public-facing Wiki and set up servers in various countries. During the 2010 reorganisation, The Architect left with Domscheit-Berg, taking the code behind the submission system with him. Assange said that the submission system was temporarily down because its backlog was too big. WikiLeaks later said it was down because of Domscheit-Berg's "acts of sabotage" when he left the organisation, which had forced WikiLeaks to "overhaul the entire submission system", and the staff lacked time to do so.

WikiLeaks submissions stayed offline until May 2015. While it was offline, WikiLeaks announced it was building a state-of-the-art secure submission system. The launch of the new system was delayed by security concerns about SSL certificates in 2011. During this time, WikiLeaks continued to publish documents. These publications originated from material which had been directly shared with WikiLeaks by hackers, or were the result of Wikileaks organising and republishing already-public leaks. In an October 2011 press conference, Assange said that because the submission system did not work, sources "had to establish contacts with the organisation and transmit us the material through other mechanisms". In 2011 Forbes suggested that Andy Müller-Maguhn and Bugged Planet might be WikiLeaks' source for the Spy Files and in 2018 a former WikiLeaks associate said that Müller-Maguhn and a colleague administered the submission server in 2016, though Müller-Maguhn denies this. That October, WikiLeaks suggested "lawyer to lawyer" as an alternate submission method, naming Margaret Ratner Kunstler.

Assange told writer Charles Glass in 2023 that WikiLeaks was no longer able to publish due to his imprisonment and the effect that US government surveillance and WikiLeaks' funding restrictions were having on potential whistleblowers. Assange said that other media outlets were not filling the void.

== Legal issues ==
There have been many legal issues in different countries and several investigations surrounding WikiLeaks since it was founded.

In August 2010, the internet payment company Moneybookers closed WikiLeaks' account due to publicity over its release of the Afghan war logs and because WikiLeaks had been added to the official US watchlist and an Australian government blacklist.

=== Legal issues in Australia ===
In December 2010, the Australian Prime Minister Julia Gillard said that "I absolutely condemn the placement of this information on the WikiLeaks website – it's a grossly irresponsible thing to do and an illegal thing to do". After criticism and a revolt within her party, she said she was referring to "the original theft of the material by a junior U.S. serviceman rather than any action by Mr. Assange". The Australian Federal Police later said that the release of the cables by WikiLeaks breached no Australian laws.

On 2 September 2011 Australia's attorney general, Robert McClelland released a statement that the US diplomatic cables published by Wikileaks identified at least one ASIO officer, and that it was a crime in Australia to publish information which could identify an intelligence officer. McClelland said that "On occasions before this week, WikiLeaks redacted identifying features where the safety of individuals or national security could be put at risk. It appears this hasn't occurred with documents that have been distributed across the internet this week." According to The Guardian and Al Jazeera, this meant "Julian Assange could face prosecution in Australia."

In 2014, WikiLeaks published information about political bribery allegations, violating a gag order in Australia. According to Peter Bartlett, a media lawyer in Australia, "if Assange ever comes back to Australia, you would expect that he would immediately be charged with breaking a suppression order."

=== Legal issues in Europe ===
==== Germany ====
In December 2008 WikiLeaks said that BND President Ernst Uhrlau threatened WikiLeaks with criminal prosecution if it did not remove "files or reports related to the BND". Later that month WikiLeaks published what it said were emails with the BND.

In March 2009, German police raided the offices of Wikileaks Germany and the homes of Theodor Reppe, who owned the registration for WikiLeaks' German domain while searching for evidence of "distribution of pornographic material". The Register reported that

As well as wasting the time of 11 detectives involved in this raid, Wikileaks claim that police requested the passwords to the "wikileaks.de" domain, asked that the entire domain be disabled, failed to inform Mr Reppe of his rights, and then issued false statements claiming that Mr. Reppe had agreed to "not having a witness" present. According to Wikileaks, the Police would give no further information to Mr. Reppe and no contact was made with Wikileaks before or after the search. Wikileaks are therefore in the dark as to exactly why the raid occurred.

==== United Kingdom ====
On 8 February 2018, the UK Supreme Court unanimously allowed a leaked document that had been published by WikiLeaks to be admitted as evidence. The cable had been excluded from use in an earlier part of the case before the Administrative Court based on the fact that it was a diplomatic communication, which enjoy "inviolable" Vienna Convention protections that prevent them from being used in court outside of exceptional circumstances. The Supreme Court ruled that since the document had already been widely disseminated, it had lost any protections it might have had.

=== Legal issues in United States ===
In early February 2008, the Julius Baer Group sued WikiLeaks in California to have documents removed from their website. Judge Jeffrey White forced Dynadot to disassociate the site's domain name records with its servers, preventing use of the domain name to reach the site. Initially, the bank only wanted the documents to be removed (WikiLeaks had failed to name a contact person). After civil rights challenges, the judge lifted the injunction and the bank dropped the case on 5 March 2008.

On 20 April 2018, the Democratic National Committee filed a multimillion-dollar lawsuit in federal district court in Manhattan against Russia, the Trump campaign, WikiLeaks and Julian Assange, alleging a conspiracy to disrupt the 2016 United States presidential election in Trump's favour. The suit was dismissed with prejudice on 30 July 2019. In his judgement, Judge John Koeltl said that WikiLeaks "did not participate in any wrongdoing in obtaining the materials in the first place" and therefore was within the law in publishing the information. The federal judge also wrote

The DNC's interest in keeping 'donor lists' and 'fundraising strategies' secret is dwarfed by the newsworthiness of the documents as a whole...If WikiLeaks could be held liable for publishing documents concerning the DNC's political financial and voter-engagement strategies simply because the DNC labels them 'secret' and trade secrets, then so could any newspaper or other media outlet.

==== United States criminal investigations ====
The US Justice Department began a criminal investigation of WikiLeaks and Julian Assange soon after the leak of diplomatic cables in 2010 began. The Washington Post reported that the department was considering charges under the Espionage Act of 1917, an action which former prosecutors characterised as "difficult" because of First Amendment protections for the press. Several Supreme Court cases, while not conclusive, (e.g. Bartnicki v. Vopper) have established that the American Constitution protects the re-publication of illegally gained information provided the publishers did not themselves violate any laws in acquiring it. The question of criminal punishment or a civil injunction after publication, like in the WikiLeaks case, is less established.

In 2010, the NSA added Assange to its Manhunting Timeline. In August 2010, the Pentagon had concluded that the Afghan War documents leak broke the law. A letter from the Department of Defence general counsel said that "it is the view of the Department of Defence that WikiLeaks obtained this material in circumstances that constitute a violation of US law, and that as long as WikiLeaks holds this material, the violation of the law is ongoing." In November 2010, Harold Koh, the Legal Adviser of the Department of State, wrote that the United States diplomatic cables leak "were provided in violation of US law and without regard for the grave consequences of this action" and "as long as WikiLeaks holds such material, the violation of the law is ongoing".

On 14 December 2010 the United States Department of Justice issued a subpoena directing Twitter to provide information for accounts registered to or associated with WikiLeaks. Twitter decided to notify its users.

In 2011 a WikiLeaks volunteer became an FBI informant and Google was served with search warrants for the contents of email accounts belonging to WikiLeaks volunteers Herbert Snorrason and Smari McCarthy. The NSA discussed categorising WikiLeaks as a "malicious foreign actor" for surveillance purposes.

In March 2012, Google was served with search warrants for the contents of email accounts and other information belonging to WikiLeaks staff members Sarah Harrison, Joseph Farrell, and Kristinn Hrafnsson as part of a criminal investigation with alleged offences including espionage, conspiracy to commit espionage, the theft or conversion of property belonging to the United States government, violation of the Computer Fraud and Abuse Act, and criminal conspiracy. According to Daniel Domscheit-Berg in 2010, the WikiLeaks email accounts for Kristinn Hrafnsson and a young WikiLeaks staffer had automatically forwarded to their Google account, opening the organisation to surveillance risks.

By 2013, Jérémie Zimmermann, Smári McCarthy, Jacob Appelbaum, David House and Jennifer Robinson had been detained and interrogated or approached when attempts were made to recruit them as informants.

In 2014, FBI and CIA officials lobbied the White House to designate Wikileaks as an "information broker" to allow for more investigative tools against it and according to former officials "potentially paving the way" for its prosecution. Laura Poitras later described attempts to classify herself and Assange as "information brokers" rather than journalists as "a threat to journalists worldwide".

In April 2017, prosecutors began drafting a memo that considered charging members of WikiLeaks with conspiracy, theft of government property or violating the Espionage Act. That month, CIA director Mike Pompeo called WikiLeaks "a non-state hostile intelligence service often abetted by state actors like Russia". In December 2019, Congress designated Wikileaks and Julian Assange as a "non-state hostile intelligence service often abetted by state actors" that "should be treated as such a service by the United States" in the National Defense Authorization Act for Fiscal Year 2020. In the opinion of some former officials, the designation allowed the CIA to launch and plan operations that did not require presidential approval or congressional notice.

In 2017 in the wake of the Vault 7 leaks, the CIA discussed plans to kidnap or assassinate Julian Assange, according to Yahoo! News in September 2021. It also planned to spy on associates of WikiLeaks, sow discord among its members, and steal their electronic devices. Former CIA Director Mike Pompeo stated that the US officials who had spoken to Yahoo should be prosecuted for exposing CIA activities.

In November 2018, an accidental filing with Assange's name was seen to indicate there were undisclosed charges against him. On 11 April 2019, Assange was charged in a computer hacking conspiracy. On 23 May, a superseding indictment was filed with charges of Conspiracy to Receive National Defense Information, Obtaining National Defense Information, Disclosure of National Defense Information, and Conspiracy to Commit Computer Intrusion. On 24 June 2020, another superseding indictment was filed which added to the allegations but not the charges.

The day after charging Assange, prosecutors contacted Domscheit-Berg. Prosecutors also spoke with David House for about 90 minutes, who had previously testified to the grand jury in exchange for immunity. House testified about helping run political operations for WikiLeaks and that Assange wanted him "to help achieve favorable press for Chelsea Manning." According to House, the grand jury "wanted full insight into WikiLeaks, what its goals were and why I was associated with it. . . . It was all related to disclosures around the war logs." House said he had contact with Assange until 2013 and with WikiLeaks until 2015. Chelsea Manning and Jeremy Hammond refused to testify for the grand jury.

In early 2019, the Mueller report wrote the Special Counsel's office considered charging WikiLeaks or Assange "as conspirators in the computer-intrusion conspiracy and that there were "factual uncertainties" about the role that Assange may have played in the hacks or their distribution that were "the subject of ongoing investigations" by the US Attorney's Office.

In June 2023, The Age reported that the FBI is seeking to gather new evidence in the case, based on a request from the FBI to interview Andrew O'Hagan, who refused the request.

In June 2024, Assange pled guilty to one count of violating the Espionage Act. Under the plea deal, he was sentenced to time served and released. He agreed to instruct Wikileaks to destroy or return unpublished documents.

==== Use of leaked documents in court ====
In April 2011 the US Department of Justice warned military lawyers acting for Guantanamo Bay detainees against clicking of links on sites such as The New York Times that might lead to classified files published by WikiLeaks. In June the same year the US Department of Justice ruled that attorneys acting for Guantanamo Bay detainees could cite documents published by WikiLeaks. The use of the documents was subject to restrictions.

== Publications ==
The initial tranche of WikiLeaks' documents came from a WikiLeaks' activist who owned a server that was a node in the Tor network. After they noticed that Chinese hackers used the network to gather information from foreign governments, the activist began recording the information. This let Assange show potential contributors that WikiLeaks was viable and say it had "received over one million documents from thirteen countries".

=== 2006–2008 ===
- WikiLeaks posted its first document in December 2006, a decision to assassinate Somali government officials signed by rebel leader Sheikh Hassan Dahir Aweys. Assange and WikiLeaks were uncertain of its authenticity, and the document's authenticity was never determined.
- In August 2007, the UK newspaper The Guardian published a story about corruption by the family of the former Kenyan leader Daniel arap Moi based on information provided via WikiLeaks. Corruption was a major issue in the election that followed, which was marred by violence. According to Assange, "1,300 people were eventually killed, and 350,000 were displaced. That was a result of our leak. On the other hand, the Kenyan people had a right to that information and 40,000 children a year die of malaria in Kenya. And many more die of money being pulled out of Kenya, and as a result of the Kenyan shilling being debased".
- In November 2007, a March 2003 copy of Standard Operating Procedures for Camp Delta detailing the protocol of the US Army at the Guantanamo Bay detention camp was released. The document revealed that some prisoners were off-limits to the International Committee of the Red Cross, something that the US military had in the past denied repeatedly. The Guantánamo Bay Manual included procedures for transferring prisoners and methods of evading protocols of the Geneva convention.
- In February 2008, WikiLeaks released documents that it said showed involvement in money laundering and tax evasion at the Cayman Islands branch of the Swiss Bank Julius Baer given to WikiLeaks by Rudolf Elmer, which resulted in the bank suing WikiLeaks and obtaining an injunction which temporarily suspended the operation of wikileaks.org. The California judge had Dynadot, the service provider of WikiLeaks block the site's domain (wikileaks.org) on 18 February 2008. The website was instantly mirrored, and later that month the judge overturned his previous decision citing First Amendment concerns and questions about legal jurisdiction.
- In March 2008, WikiLeaks published what it referred to as "the collected secret 'bibles' of Scientology", and three days later received letters threatening to sue them for breach of copyright.
- In September 2008, during the 2008 United States presidential election campaigns, the contents of a Yahoo account belonging to Republican vice-presidential nominee Sarah Palin were posted on WikiLeaks after being hacked by 4chan user David Kernell.
- In November 2008, the membership list of the far-right British National Party was posted to WikiLeaks, after appearing briefly on a weblog. A year later, in October 2009, another list of BNP members was leaked, said by the BNP's leader, Nick Griffin, to be a 'malicious forgery'.

=== 2009 ===
- During 2008 and 2009, WikiLeaks published lists of forbidden or illegal web addresses for Australia, Denmark, Norway and Thailand. These were created to prevent access to child pornography, but half the links are to unrelated sites, including online poker sites, YouTube links, regular gay and straight porn sites, Wikipedia entries, euthanasia sites, websites of fringe religions such as satanic sites, fetish sites, Christian sites, the website of a tour operator and even a Queensland dentist. Some Wikileaks pages were also added to the Australian blacklist after it published the Danish blacklist. According to Australian officials, some of the links published by WikiLeaks "have never been the subject of a complaint or ACMA investigation, and have never been included on the ACMA blacklist".
- In January 2009, WikiLeaks released 86 telephone intercept recordings of Peruvian politicians and businessmen involved in the 2008 Peru oil scandal.
- In February, WikiLeaks cracked the encryption to and published NATO's Master Narrative for Afghanistan and three other classified or restricted NATO documents on the Pentagon Central Command (CENTCOM) site.
- During February, WikiLeaks released 6,780 Congressional Research Service reports followed in March by a set of documents belonging to Barclays Bank that had been ordered removed from the website of The Guardian.
- In July, WikiLeaks released a report disclosing a "serious nuclear accident" at the Iranian Natanz nuclear facility. According to media reports, the accident may have been the direct result of a cyber-attack at Iran's nuclear program, carried out with the Stuxnet computer worm, a cyber-weapon allegedly built by the United States and Israel.
- In September, internal documents from Kaupthing Bank were leaked from shortly before the collapse of Iceland's banking sector, which had caused the 2008–2012 Icelandic financial crisis. The document showed that suspiciously large sums of money were loaned to various owners of the bank, and large debts written off.
- In October, Joint Services Protocol 440, a British document advising the security services on how to avoid documents being leaked, was published by WikiLeaks.
- In November, released 570,000 intercepts of pager messages sent on the day of the 11 September attacks. These included messages sent from the Pentagon, the FBI, the Federal Emergency Management Agency and the NYPD, in response to the disaster.

==== Trafigura report and super-injunction ====
In September 2009 Wikileaks published the Minton Report, a scientific report about the 2006 Ivory Coast toxic waste dump. The oil-trading firm Trafigura had illegally exported toxic waste and then had it dumped in Abidjan, resulting in deaths and severe health problems in the local population. 30,000 claimants sued Trafigura in London, in one of the largest class-action suits brought before a British court. The company had its law firm Carter‑Ruck obtain a super-injunction to prevent discussion by the media of either the contents of the report or the existence of the injunction itself. Assange published two editorials on Wikileaks about the situation, writing:

On September 14, WikiLeaks released the full Minton report in an attempt to undermine the injunction. The UK press was then left in the Kafkaesque position where neither the Minton report, nor the injunction against it could be mentioned, despite the report appearing on the front page of WikiLeaks.

Wikileaks maintained the report on its site and encouraged British journalists on the social network Twitter to break the censorship brought about by the injunction. After a question had been tabled about the report in the House of Commons under parliamentary privilege, Trafigura's law firm Carter‑Ruck said the injunction was sub judice, which MPs worried could prevent discussion of the affair in parliament itself. The publicity generated about the easy availability of the report on the Wikileaks website, and subsequently its publication by the Norwegian broadcaster NRK, led Carter-Ruck to agree to a modification of the injunction. The affair prompted a wider discussion in the British press about the continued use of super-injunctions.

=== 2010 ===
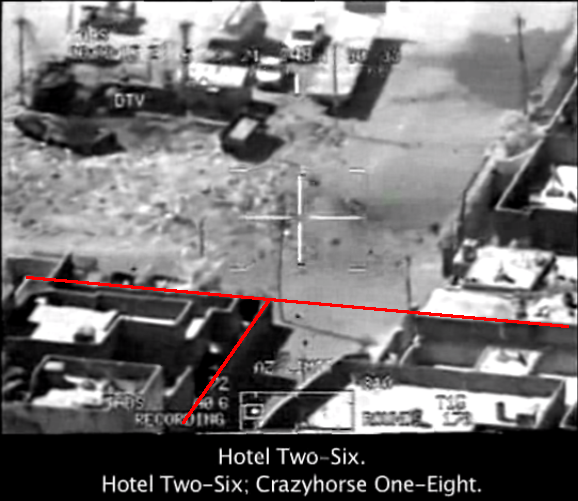
Gun camera footage of the airstrike of 12 July 2007 in Baghdad, showing the slaying of Namir Noor-Eldeen and a dozen other civilians by a US helicopter

In February, WikiLeaks published a leaked diplomatic cable from the United States Embassy in Reykjavik relating to the Icesave dispute. The cable, known as Reykjavik 13, was the first of the classified documents WikiLeaks published among those allegedly provided to them by Chelsea Manning.

In March, WikiLeaks released a secret 32-page US Department of Defense Counterintelligence Analysis Report, written in March 2008, that discusses the leaking of material by WikiLeaks and how it could be deterred. It also released a CIA report about the public relations strategies that would best be employed to shore up support for the Afghan war in Europe. The Nation referred to it as a "call to arms for a propaganda war", and Albert Stahel of the Strategic Studies Institute in Zurich told Deutsche Welle that it is "a marketing concept. And the object of it is to manipulate the public".

A classified video of the 12 July 2007 Baghdad airstrike was released in April, showing two Reuters employees being fired at after the pilots mistakenly thought the men were carrying weapons, which were in fact cameras. After the men were killed, the video shows US forces firing on a family van that stopped to pick up the bodies. Press reports of the number killed in the attacks vary from 12 to "over 18". Among the dead were two journalists and two children were also wounded.

In June, Manning was arrested after alleged chat logs were given to United States authorities by former hacker Adrian Lamo, in whom she had confided. Manning reportedly told Lamo she had leaked the "Collateral Murder" video, a video of the Granai airstrike and about 260,000 diplomatic cables to WikiLeaks. Manning later said that before WikiLeaks, she tried approaching The Washington Post, The New York Times and Politico.

In July, WikiLeaks released 92,000 documents related to the war in Afghanistan between 2004 and the end of 2009 to the publications The Guardian, The New York Times and Der Spiegel. The documents detail individual incidents including "friendly fire" and civilian casualties. WikiLeaks asked the Pentagon and human-rights groups to help remove names from the documents to reduce the potential harm caused by their release but did not receive assistance. WikiLeaks only reviewed about 2,000 documents in detail and used a tagging and keyword system. Assange said that a court might decide somethings were crimes, but added that "army personnel are basically engineers, who build roads and fire guns. They are frank and direct, and the top people mostly won't lie to you unless they're repeating a lie that someone else told them".

After the Love Parade stampede in Duisburg, Germany, on 24 July 2010, a local resident published internal documents of the city administration regarding the planning of Love Parade. The city government reacted by securing a court order on 16 August forcing the removal of the documents from the website on which it was hosted. On 20 August 2010, WikiLeaks released 43 internal documents regarding the Love Parade 2010.

After the leak of information concerning the Afghan War, in October 2010, around 400,000 documents relating to the Iraq War were released. The US Department of Defense referred to the Iraq War Logs as "the largest leak of classified documents in its history". Media coverage of the leaked documents emphasised claims that the US government had ignored reports of torture by the Iraqi authorities during the period after the 2003 war.

=== United States diplomatic cables leak ===
On 28 November 2010 WikiLeaks and El País, Le Monde, Der Spiegel, The Guardian, and The New York Times started simultaneously to publish the first 220 of 251,287 leaked documents labelled confidential – but not top-secret – and dated from 28 December 1966 to 28 February 2010.

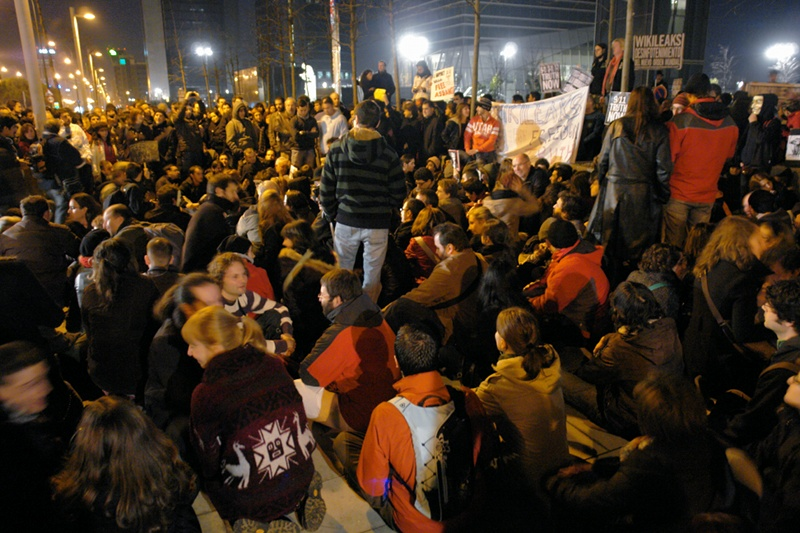
WikiLeaks supporters protest in front of the British Embassy in Madrid, 11 December 2010.

The contents of the diplomatic cables include numerous unguarded comments and revelations regarding: US diplomats gathering personal information about Ban Ki-moon, Secretary-General of the United Nations, and other top UN officials; critiques and praises about the host countries of various United States embassies; political manoeuvring regarding climate change; discussion and resolutions towards ending ongoing tension in the Middle East; efforts and resistance towards nuclear disarmament; actions in the war on terror; assessments of other threats around the world; dealings between various countries; United States intelligence and counterintelligence efforts; and other diplomatic actions. Reactions to the United States diplomatic cables leak varied. The overthrow of the presidency in Tunisia of 2011 has been attributed partly to reaction against the corruption revealed by leaked cables.

According to the former US Ambassador to Cameroon from 2004 to 2007, Niels Marquardt, Marafa Hamidou Yaya was arrested on "entirely unproven corruption charges", subjected to a "kangaroo court", and given a 25-year prison sentence. Marquardt said Marafa's only crime was having told him that he "might be interested" in the presidency one day. According to Marquardt, when Wikileaks released the cable in which this was mentioned, it became front-page news in Cameroon and led directly to Marafa's arrest. The U.S. ambassador at the time, Robert Jackson, said Marafa's trial did not specify the evidence against him.

==== Unredacted cable release ====
===== Background =====
In August 2010, Assange gave Guardian journalist David Leigh an encryption key and a URL where he could locate the file containing the U.S. diplomatic cables. In February 2011 David Leigh and Luke Harding of The Guardian published the book WikiLeaks: Inside Julian Assange's War on Secrecy containing the encryption key. Leigh said he believed the key was a temporary one that would expire within days. WikiLeaks supporters disseminated the encrypted files to mirror sites in December 2010 after WikiLeaks experienced cyber-attacks. When WikiLeaks learned what had happened it notified the US State Department. On 25 August 2011 the German magazine Der Freitag published an article giving details which would enable people to piece the information together.

===== Release =====
WikiLeaks posted some unredacted cables before their media partners edited them, but later redacted them.

In January 2011, several unredacted cables not on the WikiLeaks website were posted online by an associate of WikiLeaks, Israel Shamir. The cables included the names of people implied to be connected to bribery, and highly suggestive clues about the identity of an American informant. Shamir explained: "Handing confidential and secret information to everybody is the thing of Wikileaks. That's what it is about. Your question is like asking police why they catch thieves. That is what they are for." Yulia Latynina, writing in The Moscow Times, alleged that Shamir concocted a cable which allegedly quoted European Union diplomats' plans to walk out of the Durban II speech by Iranian president Mahmoud Ahmadinejad, for publication in the pro-Putin Russian Reporter in December 2010. Shamir has denied this accusation.

On 29 August, WikiLeaks published over 130,000 unredacted cables. On 31 August, WikiLeaks tweeted a link to a torrent of the encrypted data. On 1 September 2011, WikiLeaks announced that an encrypted version of the un-redacted US State Department cables had been available via BitTorrent for months and that the decryption key was available. WikiLeaks said that on 2 September it would publish the entire, unredacted archive in searchable form on its website. According to Assange, Wikileaks did this so that possible targets could be informed and better defend themselves and to provide a reliable source for the leaks. Glenn Greenwald wrote that "the best and safest course was to release all the cables in full, so that not only the world's intelligence agencies but everyone had them, so that steps could be taken to protect the sources and so that the information in them was equally available".

The US cited the release in the opening of its request for extradition of Assange, saying his actions put lives at risk. The defence gave evidence it said would show that Assange was careful to protect lives. John Young, the owner and operator of the website Cryptome testified at Assange's extradition hearing that the unredacted cables were published by Cryptome on 1 September, the day before Wikileaks. Young testified that "no US law enforcement authority has notified me that this publication of the cables is illegal, consists or contributes to a crime in any way, nor have they asked for them to be removed".

The Guardian wrote that the decision to publish the cables in a searchable form was made by Assange alone, a decision that it, and its four previous media partners, condemned. According to The Guardian, several thousand files in the archive were marked "strictly protect" which indicated officials thought sources could be endangered by their release. In a joint statement, The Guardian, El País, New York Times and Der Spiegel said they "deplore the decision of WikiLeaks to publish the unredacted state department cables, which may put sources at risk" and "we cannot defend the needless publication of the complete data – indeed, we are united in condemning it." Le Monde said it would also sign the statement. In response, WikiLeaks accused The Guardian of false statements and nepotism. Out of concern for those involved, Reporters Without Borders temporarily suspended their WikiLeaks mirror. According to The Guardian, "the newly published archive" contained "more than 1,000 cables identifying individual activists; several thousand labelled with a tag used by the US to mark sources it believes could be placed in danger; and more than 150 specifically mentioning whistleblowers".

According to media reports, after WikiLeaks published the unredacted cables, Ethiopian journalist Argaw Ashine was interrogated several times about a reference to him in a cable talking to a government source. The source told him about plans to arrest the editors of the critical Ethiopian weekly Addis Neger, who fled the country a month after talking to Ashine. Ashine was subjected to government harassment and intimidation and was forced to flee the country.

The U.S. established an Information Review Task Force (IRTF) to investigate the impact of WikiLeaks' publications. According to IRTF reports, the leaks could cause "serious damage" and "the lives of cooperating Afghans, Iraqis, and other foreign interlocutors have been placed at increased risk". In 2013, the task force's head, Brigadier General Robert Carr, testified at Chelsea Manning's sentencing hearing. Carr said under questioning from the defence counsel that the task force had no specific examples of anyone who had lost their life due to WikiLeaks' publication of material provided by Manning. Ed Pilkington wrote in The Guardian that Carr's testimony significantly undermined the argument that WikiLeaks' publications put lives at risk. In 2020, a lawyer for the US said that "sources, whose redacted names and other identifying information was contained in classified documents published by Wikileaks, who subsequently disappeared, although the US can't prove at this point that their disappearance was the result of being outed by Wikileaks."

=== 2011–2015 ===
In late April 2011, files related to the Guantanamo prison were released. In December 2011, WikiLeaks started to release the Spy Files. On 27 February 2012, WikiLeaks began publishing more than five million emails from the Texas-headquartered "global intelligence" company Stratfor, and on 5 July 2012, WikiLeaks began publishing the Syria Files, both had given to WikiLeaks by Anonymous. Outlets reported that the Stratfor emails had malware. On 25 October 2012, WikiLeaks began publishing The Detainee Policies, files covering the rules and procedures for detainees in US military custody. In April 2013 WikiLeaks republished more than 1.7 million declassified US diplomatic and intelligence documents from the 1970s, including the Kissinger cables, from the National Archives and Records Administration.

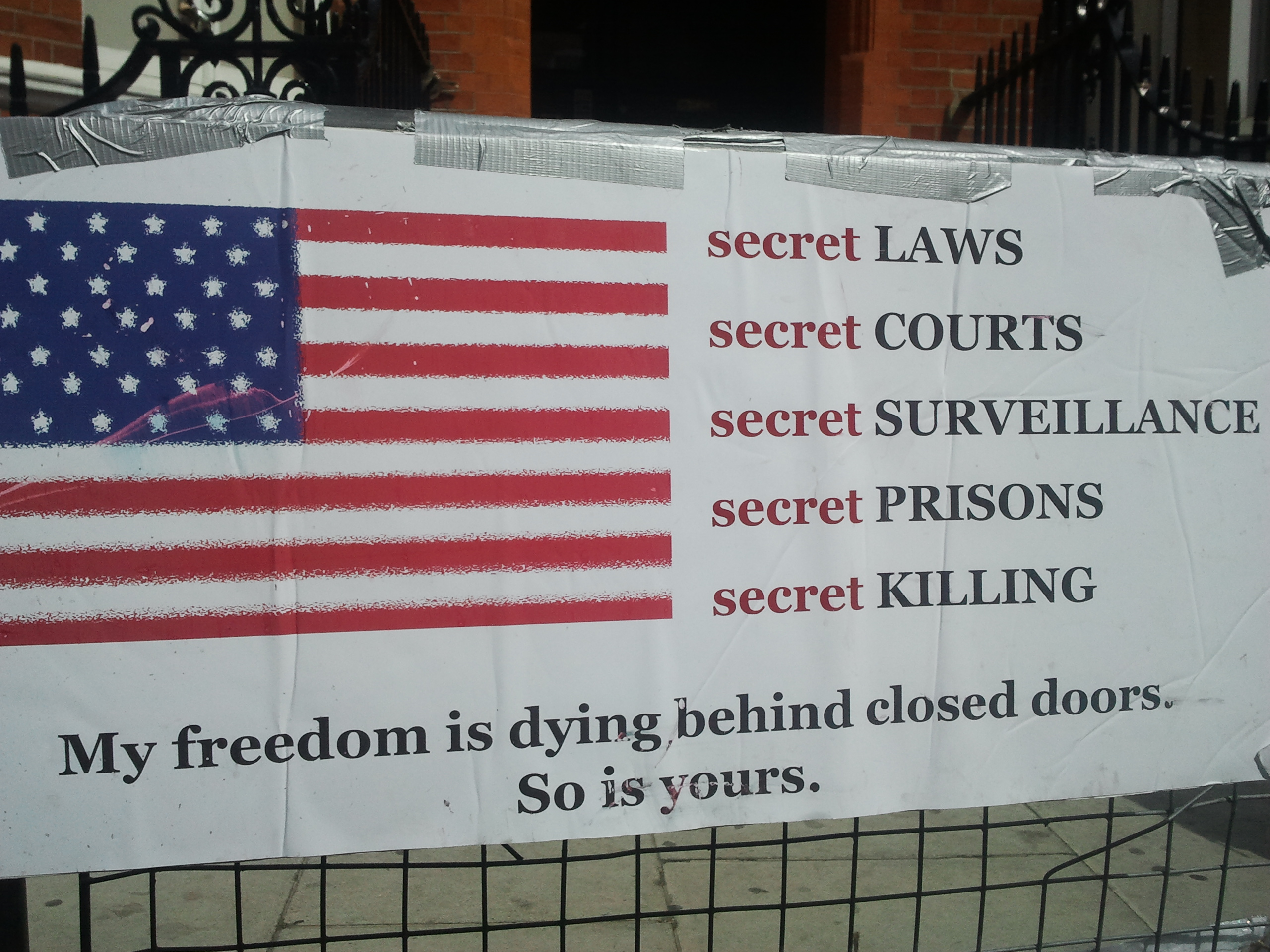
Placard in front of Embassy of Ecuador, London, 22 August 2012

In September 2013, WikiLeaks published "Spy Files 3", 250 documents from more than 90 surveillance companies. On 13 November 2013, a draft of the Trans-Pacific Partnership's Intellectual Property Rights chapter was published by WikiLeaks. In September 2014, WikiLeaks published files from Gamma Group International, including what WikiLeaks called "weaponised malware". On 10 June 2015, WikiLeaks published the draft on the Trans-Pacific Partnership's Transparency for Healthcare Annex, along with each country's negotiating position. On 19 June 2015 WikiLeaks began publishing documents from the Saudi Foreign Ministry that contain secret communications from various Saudi Embassies.

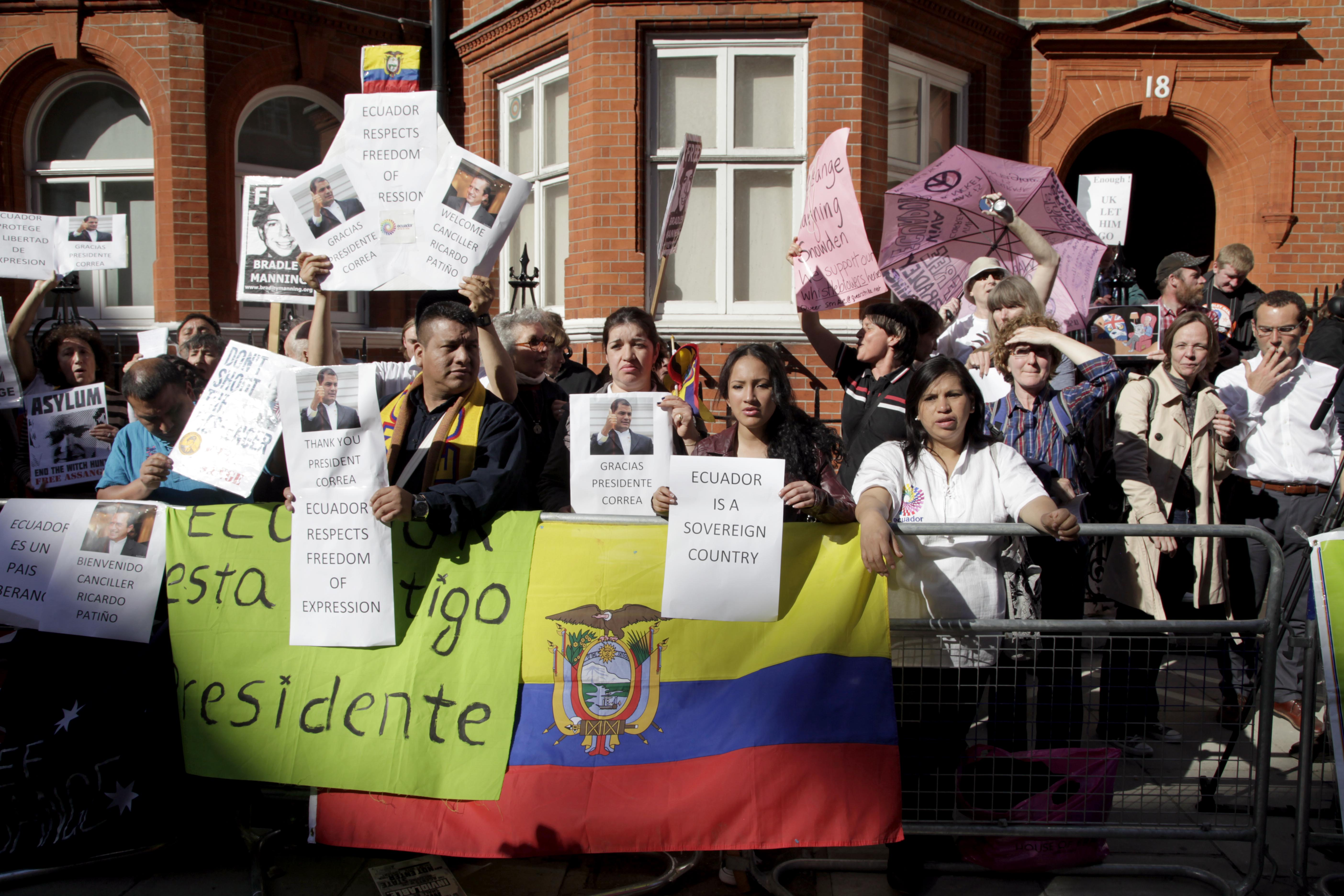
WikiLeaks supporters protest in front of the Ecuadorian embassy in London.

In June and July 2015, WikiLeaks published a series of documents on NSA spying, which showed that NSA spied on the French, German, Brazilian and Japanese governments. The documents also detailed an economic espionage against French companies and associations and extensive monitoring of the Japanese economy and Japanese companies such as Mitsubishi and Mitsui.

On 29 July 2015, WikiLeaks published a top-secret letter from the Trans-Pacific Partnership Agreement (TPP) Ministerial Meeting in December 2013 which illustrated the position of negotiating countries on "state-owned enterprises" (SOEs). On 21 October 2015 WikiLeaks published some of John O. Brennan's emails, including a draft security clearance application which contained personal information.

=== 2016 ===
During the 2016 US Democratic Party presidential primaries, WikiLeaks hosted emails sent or received by presidential candidate Hillary Clinton from her personal mail server while she was Secretary of State. The emails had been released by the US State Department under a Freedom of information request in February 2016. WikiLeaks also created a search engine to allow the public to search through Clinton's emails. In July 2016, just prior to the publication of the UK government's Iraq Inquiry report, WikiLeaks published a selection of the emails referencing the Iraq War.

On 19 July 2016, in response to the Turkish government's purges that followed the coup attempt, WikiLeaks released 294,548 emails from Turkey's ruling Justice and Development party (AKP). According to WikiLeaks, the material, which it said was the first batch from the "AKP Emails", was obtained a week before the attempted coup in the country and "is not connected, in any way, to the elements behind the attempted coup, or to a rival political party or state". After WikiLeaks announced that it would release the emails, the organisation was for over 24 hours under a "sustained attack". Following the leak, the Turkish government ordered the site to be blocked nationwide.

On 22 July 2016, WikiLeaks released approximately 20,000 emails and 8,000 files sent from or received by Democratic National Committee (DNC) personnel. Some of the emails contained personal information of donors, including home addresses and Social Security numbers. Other emails appeared to criticise Bernie Sanders or showed favouritism towards Clinton during the primaries. In July 2016, Debbie Wasserman Schultz resigned as chairwoman of the DNC because the emails released by WikiLeaks showed that the DNC was "effectively an arm of Mrs. Clinton's campaign" and had conspired to sabotage Sanders's campaign.

On 7 October 2016, WikiLeaks started releasing series of emails and documents sent from or received by Hillary Clinton campaign manager, John Podesta, including Hillary Clinton's paid speeches to banks, including Goldman Sachs. The BBC reported that the release "is unlikely to allay fears among liberal Democrats that she is too cosy with Wall Street". The DNC and Podesta files allegedly came from Russian state-sponsored hackers, which WikiLeaks denied. According to a spokesman for the Clinton campaign, "By dribbling these out every day WikiLeaks is proving they are nothing but a propaganda arm of the Kremlin with a political agenda doing Vladimir Putin's dirty work to help elect Donald Trump." President Vladimir Putin said that Russia was being falsely accused.

On 25 November 2016, WikiLeaks released emails and internal documents that provided details on the US military operations in Yemen from 2009 to March 2015. In a statement accompanying the "Yemen Files", Assange said about the US involvement in the Yemen war: "Although the United States government has provided most of the bombs and is deeply involved in the conduct of the war itself reportage on the war in English is conspicuously rare".

In December 2016, WikiLeaks published over 57,000 emails from Erdogan's son-in-law, Berat Albayrak, who was Turkey's Minister of Energy and Natural Resources. The emails show the inner workings of the Turkish government. According to WikiLeaks, the emails had been first released by Redhack.

=== 2017 ===
On 16 February 2017, WikiLeaks released a purported report on CIA espionage orders (marked as NOFORN) for the 2012 French presidential election. The order called for details of party funding, internal rivalries and future attitudes toward the United States. The Associated Press noted that "the orders seemed to represent standard intelligence-gathering."

On 7 March 2017, WikiLeaks started publishing content code-named "Vault 7", describing it as containing CIA internal documentation of their "massive arsenal" of hacking tools including malware, viruses, weaponised "zero day" exploits and remote control systems. Leaked documents, dated from 2013 to 2016, detail the capabilities of the US Central Intelligence Agency (CIA) to perform electronic surveillance and cyber warfare, such as the ability to compromise cars, smart TVs, web browsers, and operating systems. In July 2022, Joshua Schulte was convicted of leaking the files.

In September 2017, WikiLeaks released "Spy Files Russia," revealing "how a St. Petersburg-based technology company called Peter-Service helped state entities gather detailed data on Russian cellphone users, part of a national system of online surveillance called System for Operative Investigative Activities."

=== 2019 ===
In November 2019, WikiLeaks released an email from an unnamed investigator from the Organisation for the Prohibition of Chemical Weapons (OPCW) team investigating the 2018 chemical attack in Douma (Syria). The investigator accused the OPCW of covering up discrepancies. Robert Fisk said that documents released by WikiLeaks indicated that the OPCW "suppressed or failed to publish, or simply preferred to ignore, the conclusions of up to 20 other members of its staff who became so upset at what they regarded as the misleading conclusions of the final report that they officially sought to have it changed in order to represent the truth". The head of OPCW, Fernando Arias, described the leak as containing "subjective views" and stood by the original conclusions. In April 2018, WikiLeaks had offered a $100,000 reward for confidential information about "the alleged chemical attack in Douma, Syria." In a November 2020 interview with BBC, WikiLeaks' alleged source declined to say if he took money from the organisation.

On 12 November 2019, WikiLeaks began publishing what it called the Fishrot Files (Icelandic: Samherjaskjölin), a collection of thousands of documents and email communication by employees of one of Iceland's largest fish industry companies, Samherji, that indicated that the company had paid hundreds of millions Icelandic króna to officials in Namibia with the objective of acquiring the country's coveted fishing quota. The files were given to WikiLeaks by Jóhannes Stefánsson.

=== 2021 ===
In 2021, WikiLeaks made a searchable database of 17,000 publicly available documents, which it called The Intolerance Network, from the ultra-conservative Spanish Catholic organisation Hazte Oir and its international arm, CitizenGo. The documents reveal the internal workings of the organisations, their network of donors and their relationship with the Vatican. The release also includes documents from the secret Catholic organisation El Yunque. The editor of WikiLeaks, Kristinn Hrafnsson, said "As ultra right-wing political groups have gained strength in recent years, with increasing attacks on women's and LGBT rights, it is valuable to have access to documents from those who have lobbied for those changes on a global basis". According to WikiLeaks, the documents were first released in 2017.

=== Authenticity and completeness ===
According to The New Yorker, when WikiLeaks posted its first document in December 2006, "Assange and the others were uncertain of its authenticity, but they thought that readers, using Wikipedia-like features of the site, would help analyse it. ... The document's authenticity was never determined, and news about WikiLeaks quickly superseded the leak itself." When someone said they were misidentified in a Julius Baer document as having a secret Swiss bank account Assange and Domscheit-Berg added a caveat to the document saying, "according to three independent sources" the information might be false or misleading. Domscheit-Berg later wrote that they made up the "three independent sources" and that the source had "included some background information he had researched about the bank's clients" that misidentified a Swiss account holder as a German man with a similar name.

In 2008, the WikiLeaks website said "Wikileaks does not pass judgement on the authenticity of documents". Wired reported that in 2009, a "whistleblower" submitted fabricated documents to WikiLeaks. The documents were published and flagged by WikiLeaks as potential fakes.

WikiLeaks stated in 2010 that it has never released a misattributed document and that documents are assessed before release. In response to concerns about the possibility of misleading or fraudulent leaks, WikiLeaks has stated that misleading leaks "are already well-placed in the mainstream media. WikiLeaks is of no additional assistance." The FAQ in 2010 stated that: "The simplest and most effective countermeasure is a worldwide community of informed users and editors who can scrutinise and discuss leaked documents." In 2010, Assange said submitted documents were vetted by five reviewers with expertise in different topics such as language or programming, who also investigated the leaker's identity if known. Assange had the final say in document assessment.

Daniel Domscheit-Berg wrote that before WikiLeaks started working with media partners most verification of submissions was doing Google searches. According to the Columbia Journalism Review, Assange "outsourced the burden of verification" of the Afghan War documents leak, the Iraq War documents leak and Cablegate to the New York Times, The Guardian, and Der Spiegel. Yulia Latynina alleged in The Moscow Times that WikiLeaks associate Israel Shamir concocted a leaked diplomatic cable for publication in the pro-Putin Russian Reporter in December 2010. Shamir has denied this accusation.

In 2012, WikiLeaks released a statement about the Syria Files saying that:

In such a large collection of information, it is not possible to verify every single email at once; however, WikiLeaks and its co-publishers have done so for all initial stories to be published. We are statistically confident that the vast majority of the data are what they purport to be.

Columnist Eric Zorn wrote in 2016 "So far, it's possible, even likely, that every stolen email WikiLeaks has posted has been authentic," but cautioned against assuming that future releases would be equally authentic. Writer Glenn Greenwald wrote in 2016 that WikiLeaks had a "perfect, long-standing record of only publishing authentic documents." Cybersecurity experts have said that it would be easy for a person to fabricate an email or alter it, as by changing headers and metadata. Some released emails contain DKIM headers. This allows them to be verified as genuine to some degree of certainty.

In July 2016, the Aspen Institute's Homeland Security Group, a bipartisan counterterrorism organisation, warned that hackers who stole authentic data might "salt the files they release with plausible forgeries." According to Douglas Perry, Russian intelligence agencies have frequently used disinformation tactics. He wrote in 2016 that "carefully faked emails might be included in the WikiLeaks dumps. After all, the best way to make false information believable is to mix it in with true information."

In September 2016, The Daily Dot reported that WikiLeaks' Syria Files excluded "records of a €2 billion transaction between the Syrian regime and a government-owned Russian bank," citing court documents.

== Reception ==
=== Awards and support ===
The media and civil society organisations have commended Wikileaks for exposing state and corporate secrets, increasing transparency, assisting freedom of the press, and enhancing democratic discourse while challenging powerful institutions.

WikiLeaks won The Economist's New Media Award in 2008 at the Index on Censorship Awards and Amnesty International's UK Media Award in 2009. Julian Assange received the 2010 Sam Adams Award for Integrity in Intelligence for releasing secret U.S. military reports on the Iraq and Afghan wars and was named the Readers' Choice for TIME's Person of the Year in 2010.

In 2010, the UN High Commissioner for Human Rights expressed concern over what they referred to as a cyber war against WikiLeaks, and in a joint statement with the Organization of American States the UN Special Rapporteur called on states and others to keep international legal principles in mind. In 2010, a UK Information Commissioner said that "WikiLeaks is part of the phenomenon of the online, empowered citizen", and an Internet petition in support of WikiLeaks attracted more than six hundred thousand signatures.

On 16 April 2019, Mairead Maguire accepted the 2019 GUE/NGL Award for Journalists, Whistleblowers & Defenders of the Right to Information on Julian Assange's behalf.

==== Improving government and corporate transparency ====
During the early years of WikiLeaks, members of the media and academia commended it for exposing state and corporate secrets, increasing transparency, assisting freedom of the press, and enhancing democratic discourse while challenging powerful institutions.

In 2010, the UN High Commissioner for Human Rights expressed concern over what they referred to as a cyber war against WikiLeaks, and in a joint statement with the Organization of American States the UN Special Rapporteur called on states and others to keep international legal principles in mind.

=== Criticism ===
Since 2011, WikiLeaks has faced allegations of association with the Russian government which peaked during the 2016 U.S. presidential election. WikiLeaks said it had no connection with Russia. Several associates of WikiLeaks including Julian Assange, Smári McCarthy, and Sigurdur Thordarson have faced allegations related to hacking. WikiLeaks has been criticised for making misleading claims about the contents of its leaks, including the Stratfor email leak, the AKP emails and Vault 7. The group was criticised for attempting to auction information and drew intense criticism from supporters including Anonymous for putting the Global Intelligence files behind a paywall. WikiLeaks has drawn criticism for inadequate curation and violations of personal privacy from transparency advocates such as Edward Snowden, Glenn Greenwald, Amnesty International, Reporters Without Borders, the Sunlight Foundation and the Federation of American Scientists.

==== Internal conflicts and lack of transparency ====
WikiLeaks has often been criticised for demanding absolute secrecy about its activities, but openness in others.

In 2010, former advisory board member John Young accused the organisation of a lack of transparency regarding its fundraising and financial management. He stated his belief that WikiLeaks could not guarantee whistleblowers the anonymity or confidentiality it said it did and that he "would not trust them with information if it had any value, or if it put me at risk or anyone that I cared about at risk." He later became supportive of the organisation again.

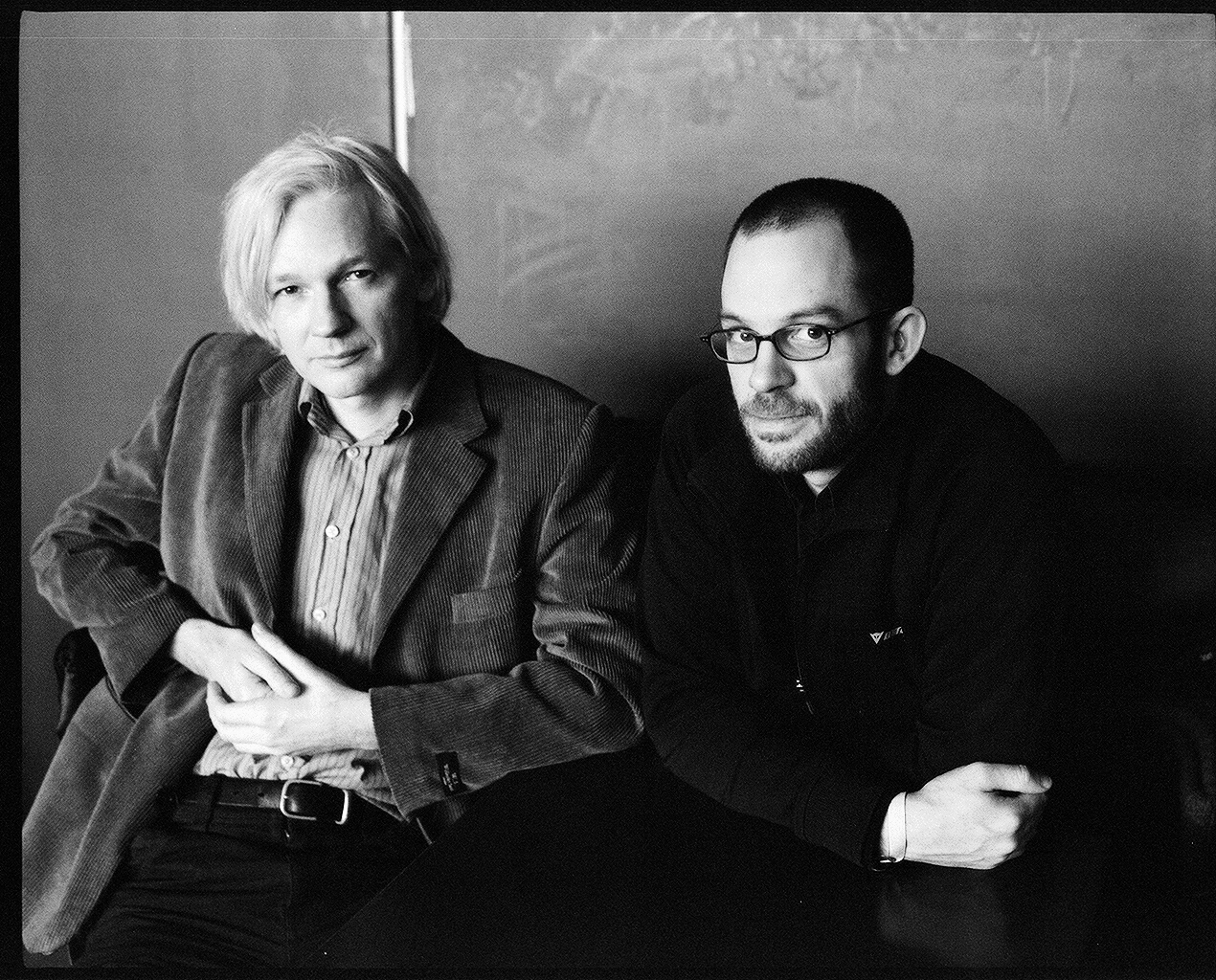
Julian Assange (left) with Daniel Domscheit-Berg who was ejected from WikiLeaks and started a rival "whistleblower" organisation named OpenLeaks

Those working for WikiLeaks are reportedly required to sign sweeping non-disclosure agreements covering all conversations, conduct, and material, with Assange having sole power over disclosure. The penalty for non-compliance in one such agreement was reportedly £12 million. WikiLeaks has been challenged for this practice, as it is seen to be hypocritical for an organisation dedicated to transparency to limit the transparency of its inner workings and limit the accountability of powerful individuals in the organisation.

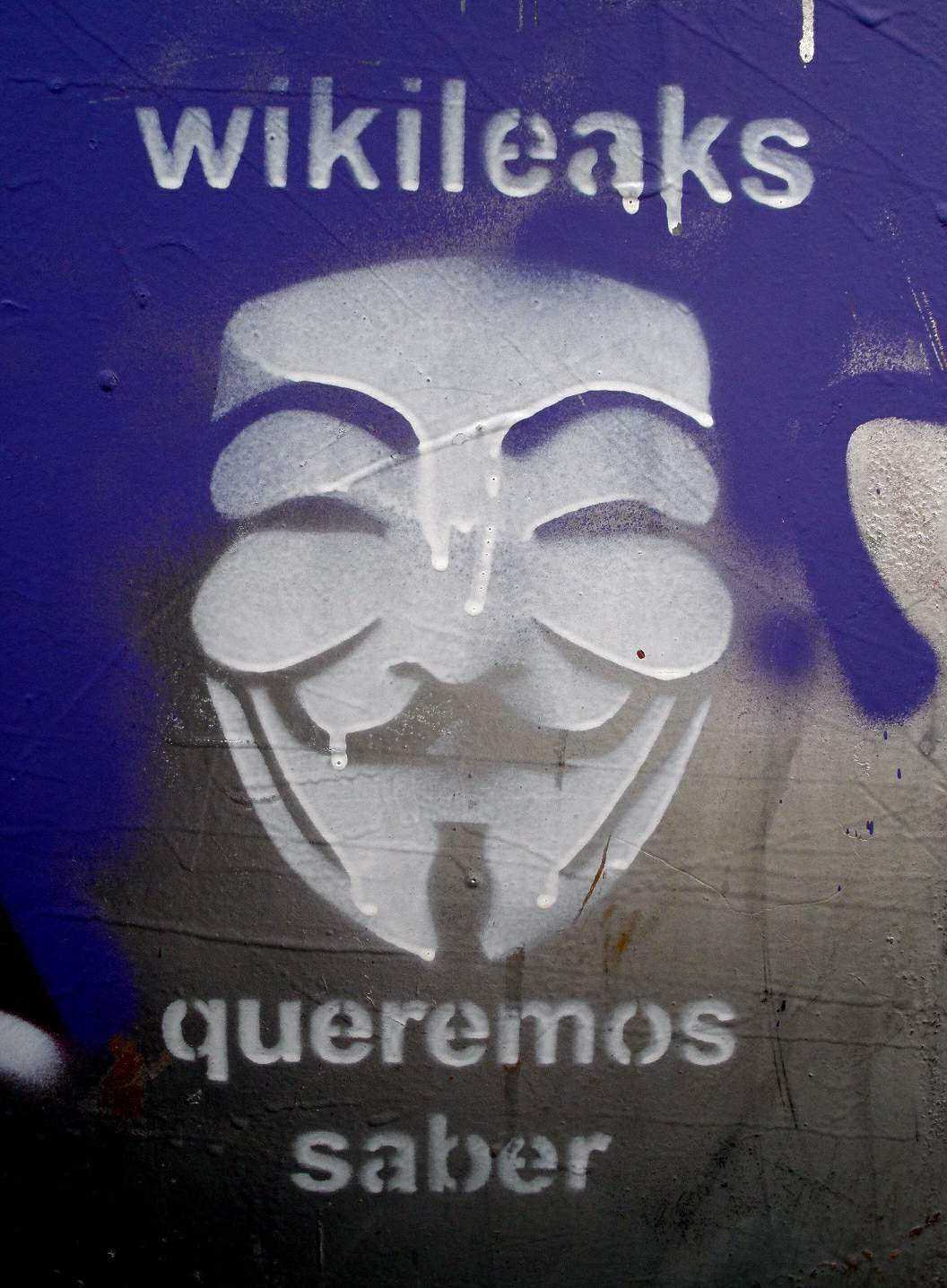
Graffiti in Bilbao "We want to know."

=== Public positions taken by United States politicians concerning WikiLeaks ===
In 2010, after WikiLeaks' release of classified U.S. government documents leaked by Chelsea Manning, then U.S. Vice-president Joe Biden said that he "would argue it is closer to being a high-tech terrorist than the Pentagon Papers". Biden said Assange "has done things that have damaged and put in jeopardy the lives and occupations of people in other parts of the world." Representative Pete Hoekstra called for decisive action against WikiLeaks. Senators Joseph Lieberman and John McCain called WikiLeaks publications the "most damaging security breach in the history of this country" and Representative Peter T. King said WikiLeaks should be designated a terrorist organisation. Sarah Palin, William Kristol and Rick Santorum compared WikiLeaks to a terrorist group. Senator John Ensign proposed amending the Espionage Act to target WikiLeaks.

An internal U.S. government review in found that the redacted diplomatic cables leak was embarrassing but caused only limited damage to U.S. interests abroad. In January 2011, a congressional official said they thought the Obama administration felt compelled to say publicly that the release caused severe damage in order to bolster legal efforts to shut down the WikiLeaks website and bring charges against the leakers. In 2012, Representative Ron Paul defended WikiLeaks in a floor speech.

In 2015, Representative Mac Thornberry said WikiLeaks publications had done "enormous" damage and helped the country's "primary adversaries". In 2016, former U.S. representative Connie Mack said the U.S. public has "a right to know" the contents of the diplomatic documents and said criticism of WikiLeaks was a way of distracting from the revelations contained in WikiLeaks' publications.

Several Republicans who had once been highly critical of WikiLeaks and Julian Assange began to speak fondly of him after WikiLeaks published the DNC leaks and started to regularly criticise Hillary Clinton and the Democratic Party. Having called WikiLeaks "disgraceful" in 2010, President-elect Donald Trump praised WikiLeaks in October 2016, saying, "I love WikiLeaks." In 2019, Trump said "I know nothing about WikiLeaks. It's not my thing." Newt Gingrich, who called for Assange to be "treated as an enemy combatant" in 2010, praised him as a "down to Earth, straight forward interviewee" in 2017. Sarah Palin, who had described Assange as an "anti-American operative with blood on his hands" in 2010, praised Assange in 2017.

In 2019, Tulsi Gabbard spoke of the "chilling effect on investigative journalism", first of the US government's reclassification of WikiLeaks from "news organization" to "hostile intelligence service", then of Assange's arrest. The National Defense Authorization Act for Fiscal Year 2020 said that "It is the sense of Congress that WikiLeaks and the senior leadership of WikiLeaks resemble a non-state hostile intelligence service often abetted by state actors and should be treated as such a service by the United States".

=== Cultural references ===
- Wikileaks: The Game, a 2010 video game by Sebastiaan Moeys that was played by more than a million people.
- War, Lies and Videotape is a documentary by French directors Paul Moreira and Luc Hermann from press agency Premieres Lignes. The film was released in France in 2011 and then broadcast worldwide.
- Underground: The Julian Assange Story is a biographical film of the early life of Julian Assange directed by Robert Connolly.
- Mediastan is a documentary released in 2013 directed by Johannes Wahlström, produced by Ken Loach's company Sixteen Films and featuring the people behind WikiLeaks. The film debuted at the Raindance Film Festival.
- The documentary We Steal Secrets: The Story of WikiLeaks by director Alex Gibney premiered at the 2013 Sundance Film Festival.
- The Fifth Estate is a film directed by Bill Condon, starring Benedict Cumberbatch as Assange. The film is based on Daniel Domscheit-Berg's book Inside WikiLeaks: My Time with Julian Assange and the World's Most Dangerous Website, as well as WikiLeaks: Inside Julian Assange's War on Secrecy by David Leigh and Luke Harding.
- The Source is a 2014 oratorio by Ted Hearne, with a libretto by Mark Doten that features WikiLeaks document disclosures by Chelsea Manning.
- The War on Journalism: The Case of Julian Assange is a 2020 documentary by Juan Passarelli.
- A Secret Australia: Revealed by the WikiLeaks Exposés was published in December 2020. The book contains 18 essays by Julian Burnside, Antony Loewenstein, Scott Ludlam, Helen Razer and others about how WikiLeaks has affected the Australian media and the Australian government's connections to the US intelligence and military industries.

== Spin-offs ==
Release of United States diplomatic cables was followed by the creation of a number of other organisations based on the WikiLeaks model. WikiLeaks spokesman Kristinn Hrafnsson responded to the idea positively, saying that having more organisations like WikiLeaks was good. In 2012, Andy Greenberg said there were more than 50 spin-offs including BaltiLeaks, BritiLeaks, BrusselsLeaks, Corporate Leaks, CrowdLeaks, EnviroLeaks, FrenchLeaks, GlobaLeaks, Indoleaks, IrishLeaks, IsraeliLeaks, Jumbo Leaks, KHLeaks, LeakyMails, Localeaks, MapleLeaks, MurdochLeaks, Office Leaks, Porn WikiLeaks, PinoyLeaks, PirateLeaks, QuebecLeaks, RuLeaks, ScienceLeaks, TradeLeaks, and UniLeaks.

- BalkanLeaks was created in December 2010 and published transcripts of wiretaps in a bribery case against Bulgarian officials, and criminal complaints and trial transcripts of Bulgarian prosecutors.
- RuLeaks was launched in December 2010 to translate and mirror publications by WikiLeaks. In January 2011, it started to publish its own content as well.
- OpenLeaks was created by a former WikiLeaks spokesperson. Daniel Domscheit-Berg said the intention was to be more transparent than WikiLeaks. OpenLeaks was supposed to start public operations in early 2011 but despite much media coverage, as of April 2013 it is not operating.
- Leakymails is a project designed to obtain and publish relevant documents exposing corruption of the political class and the powerful in Argentina.
- On 9 September 2013 a number of major Dutch media outlets supported the launch of Publeaks, which provides a secure website for people to leak documents to the media using the GlobaLeaks whistleblowing software.
- Distributed Denial of Secrets is a whistleblower site founded in 2018. Sometimes referred to as an alternative to WikiLeaks, it is best known for its publication of a large collection of internal police documents, known as BlueLeaks. The site has also published data on Russian oligarchs, fascist groups, shell companies, tax havens, banking in the Caymans and the Parler leak.

== See also ==
- Assange v Swedish Prosecution Authority
- Classified information in the United States
- Courage Foundation
- Data activism
- Digital rights
- Freedom of information
- Freedom of the Press Foundation
- ICWATCH
- Information warfare
- New York Times Co. v. United States
- Lumen (website)
- Open society
- 1993 PGP criminal investigation
- Russian interference in the 2016 United States elections
