= I.G. and Others vs. Slovakia =

I.G. and Others vs. Slovakia is the third case decided by the European Court of Human Rights against Slovakia concerning forced sterilization of Romani people or Gypsy women. Although the case was the third decision on the practice, it was actually the first case brought to the European Court by the Slovak feminist organization Center for Civil and Human Rights already in 2004.

The case concerned three Romani women - I.G., R.K. and M.K., who were forcibly sterilized in Krompachy Hospital in Eastern Slovakia. Applicants I.G. and M.K were underage minors at the time of the interventions. I.G. was sterilized in 2000, during the delivery of her second child. She was not informed about the intervention at the time and found out about it only three years later, after she examined her medical records in the Hospital. M.K. was sterilized in 1999, also during the delivery of her second child. She and her parents found about the intervention only after it was already performed on her. The applicant R.H. was sterilized in 2002 without her informed consent

Since 2003, all applicants were trying to obtain damages at the Slovak courts, including the Constitutional Court. They also acted as injured parties in the criminal proceedings, led by the Slovak police and prosecutors from 2003 onwards. Only M.K. received compensations from the District Court in Spišská Nová Ves in amount of EUR 1,593. The European Court, however, did not find this compensation adequate in the light of the seriousness of the violations.

The case was lodged to the European Court already in 2004, claiming violations of several provisions of the European Convention on Human Rights. In its decision from 13 November 2012, the European Court ruled in favor of I.G. and M.K. Since, R.K., died during the course of the proceedings, the European Court did not consider her complaint.

The European Court declared that the sterilization without informed consent of their legal guardians violated the Slovak legislation valid at the time of the interventions. As such, it violated their right to be free from inhuman and degrading treatment, guaranteed by Article 3 of the Convention. Yet again, the European Court found that Slovakia also violated the positive obligation under Article 8 of the Convention to provide effective protection of reproductive right of Romani women, who are particularly vulnerable group in the population.

Importantly, the decision differs from the previous cases on the matter in the fact that for the first time, the Court also found that the investigation led by the Slovak authorities into the case did not meet the standards of effective investigation guaranteed by the Convention (procedural aspect of Article 3).

As part of the violation of Articles 3 and 8 of the Convention, the Court ordered the Slovak Government to pay the compensations to the applicants in amount of 28,500 EUR and 27,000 EUR respectively and the reimbursement of their legal costs
