= K.H. and Others vs. Slovakia =

K.H. and Others vs. Slovakia is the first in a series of cases before the European Court for Human Rights dealing with the subject of forced sterilisation of Romani people or Gypsy women from Slovakia. The case did not deal with sterilization directly but it concerned access to medical records of forcibly sterilized Romani women for the purpose of litigation of their rights.

It was also the first case in which the European Court dealt with the right of access to medical records and with the right to so called "pre-trial evidence disclosure" neither of which have been previously defined under the European Convention on Human Rights.

== Controversy ==
The case involved eight Slovak women of Romani origin, who suspected they had been sterilised when giving birth by caesarean section in Slovakian hospitals. None of the women had been able to conceive since their last caesarean delivery and were in doubt as to how this was possible. Some of them remembered being asked to sign legal documents during the delivery, but they were unsure regarding the contents of these documents and what they had actually signed. The women and their attorneys wanted to photocopy their medical records to achieve clarity in relation to their health status, in order to potentially prepare civil claims, and to ensure that the medical documents would not be lost or destroyed by the hospitals to cover up illegal practices. Despite extensive proceedings before the Slovak courts, the women and their attorneys were not allowed to photocopy the records and petitioned the European Court.

The European Court found the violation of their rights under Article 8 of the European Convention on Human Rights as it ruled that the right to respect for private and family life encompasses informational rights related to health and health status.

Additionally, the European Court stated that the failure to allow them to make copies amounted to a violation of their right to access to justice under Article 6 of the European Convention, establishing for the first time a pre-trial evidence disclosure right. This aspect of the decision establishes that, if a state holds information about an individual that can potentially be used in litigation in the future, and if the state refuses to make this information accessible in its "physical" form (copy), the state is violating the individual's right to fair trial under the European Convention. By formulating two conditions of the right to effective access to medical information, the Court reinforced the human rights protection of data of a personal and specific nature.
