= Kristinn Hrafnsson =

Icelandic investigative journalist (born 1962)

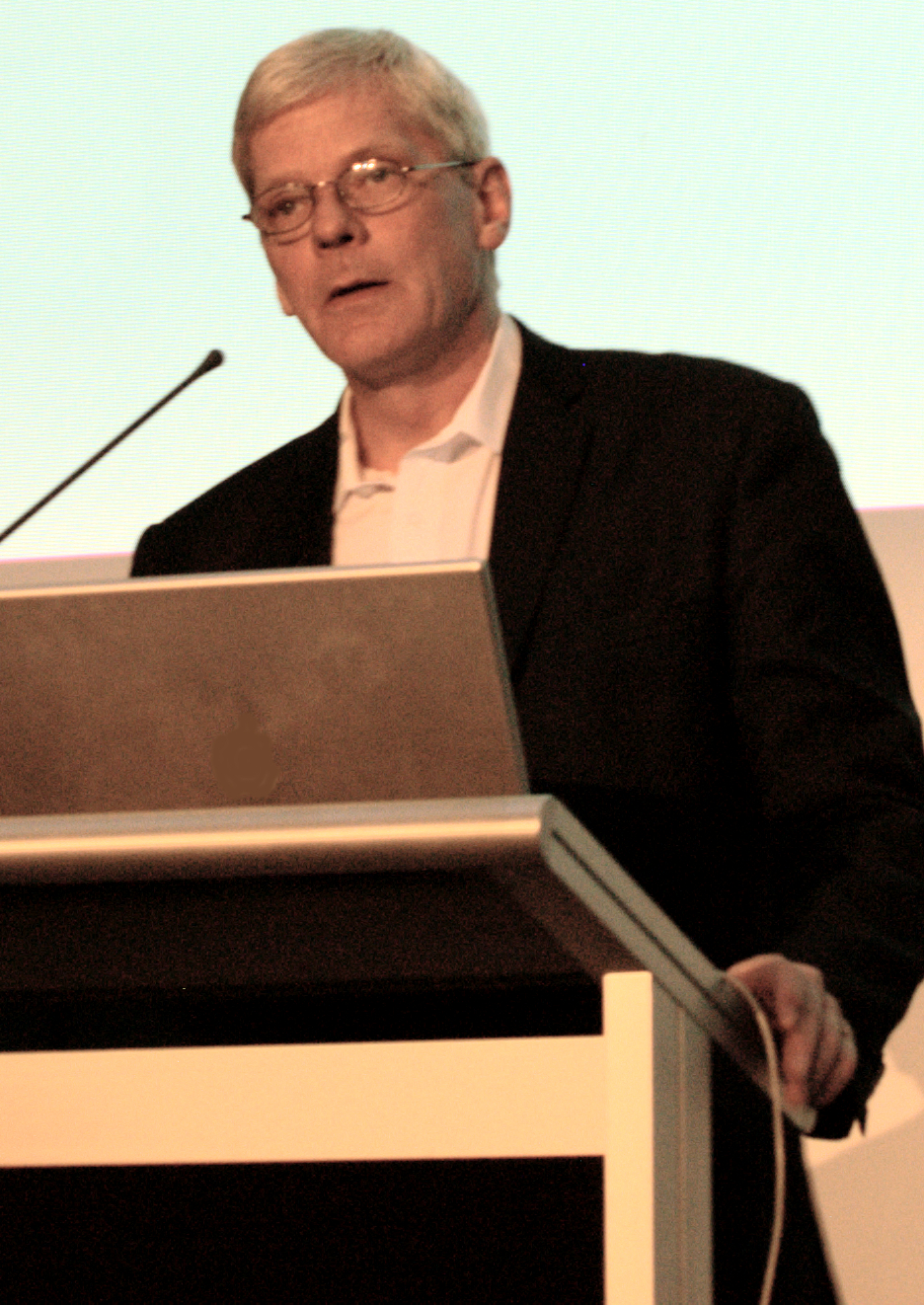
- Kristinn Hrafnsson speaks in Brisbane, Australia, in June 2011
- Born: 25 June 1962 (age 62)
- Occupation: investigative journalist
- Known for: Spokesperson and editor-in-chief of WikiLeaks

Kristinn Hrafnsson (born 25 June 1962) is an Icelandic investigative journalist who has been the editor-in-chief of WikiLeaks since 2018. He was the spokesperson for WikiLeaks between 2010 and 2017.

== Career ==
Kristinn has worked at various newspapers in Iceland and hosted the television programme Kompás on the Icelandic channel Stöð 2, where he and his team exposed criminal activity and corruption in high places. In February 2009, while investigating the connection between Iceland's Kaupthing Bank and Robert Tchenguiz and Vincent Tchenguiz, the programme was taken off air and Kristinn and his crew were sacked.

Shortly thereafter, Kristinn was hired by RÚV (The Icelandic National Broadcasting Service). In August 2009, he was working on a story about Kaupthing's loan book which had just been published on WikiLeaks, when the bank got a gag order issued by the Reykjavik sheriff's office, banning RÚV from reporting on the loan book. The prohibition order was withdrawn later.

In April 2010, he flew to Baghdad to interview children of the military attack in the Collateral Murder video published by WikiLeaks. He also helped produce the video, winning him the Icelandic journalist of the year award for 2010. Kristinn's contract with RÚV ended in July 2010.

Beginning in 2010, he collaborated with WikiLeaks, serving as the organisation's spokesman after founder Julian Assange began to have legal problems. He has called the December 2010 attacks on WikiLeaks by MasterCard, Visa, and others a "privatisation of censorship". In 2012, in his capacity as WikiLeaks spokesman, he defended the organisation on the website of Swedish Television against what he described as a smear campaign by the Swedish tabloid Expressen.

Kristinn has been named Icelandic journalist of the year three times, in 2004, 2007 and 2010 by Iceland's National Union of Journalists.

In early 2017, Kristinn stated that he was no longer spokesperson for WikiLeaks. It was announced on 26 September 2018 that Kristinn Hrafnsson had been appointed editor-in-chief of WikiLeaks by Julian Assange following an extended period in which Assange lost access to the internet earlier in the year. WikiLeaks said Assange would remain as publisher.
