= Dynadot =

Domain registrar and web hosting company

- Website type: Private Company
- Founded: 2002
- Predecessors: INamePro, LLC
- Headquarters: San Mateo, California, USA
- Area served: Worldwide
- Founder: Todd Han
- CEO: Todd Han
- Key people: Todd Han (Founder) & (President)
- Industry: Domain Registrar
- Products: Web Services
- Website: dynadot.com

Dynadot is an ICANN-accredited domain registrar and web host company founded by software engineer Todd Han in 2002. Dynadot's headquarters is located in San Mateo, California, with offices in Zhengzhou and Beijing, China, as well as Toronto, Canada.

== History ==
Dynadot was founded in 2002, in San Mateo, California, by Todd Han, a software engineer. Originally called INamePro, LLC, the organization changed their name to Dynadot in 2003. Han was the sole operator of the company during the first-three years of its launch and he had hired the company's first employee in 2005.

== Bank Julius Baer/Wikileaks lawsuit ==
In February 2008, the wikileaks.org domain name was taken offline after the Swiss bank Julius Baer Group sued WikiLeaks and Dynadot, the wikileaks.org domain registrar, in a court in California, United States, and obtained a permanent injunction ordering the shutdown. WikiLeaks had hosted allegations of illegal activities at the bank's Cayman Islands branch. WikiLeaks' U.S. Registrar, Dynadot, complied with the order by removing its DNS entries. However, the website remained accessible via its numeric IP address, and online activists immediately mirrored WikiLeaks at dozens of alternative websites worldwide.

The American Civil Liberties Union and the Electronic Frontier Foundation filed a motion protesting the action taken against WikiLeaks. The Reporters Committee for Freedom of the Press assembled a coalition of media and press that filed an amicus curiae brief on WikiLeaks' behalf. The coalition included major U.S. newspaper publishers and press organizations, such as the American Society of News Editors, the Associated Press, the Citizen Media Law Project, the E. W. Scripps Company, the Gannett Company, the Hearst Corporation, the Los Angeles Times, the National Newspaper Publishers Association, the Newspaper Association of America and the Society of Professional Journalists. The coalition requested to be heard as a friend of the court to call attention to relevant points of law that it believed the court had overlooked (on the grounds that WikiLeaks had not appeared in court to defend itself, and that no First Amendment issues had yet been raised before the court). Amongst other things, the coalition argued that:

WikiLeaks provides a forum for dissidents and whistleblowers across the globe to post documents, but the Dynadot injunction imposes a prior restraint that drastically curtails access to Wikileaks from the Internet based on a limited number of postings challenged by Plaintiffs. The Dynadot injunction therefore violates the bedrock principle that an injunction cannot enjoin all communication by a publisher or other speaker.

Judge Jeffrey White, who initially issued the injunction, vacated it on 29 February 2008, citing First Amendment concerns and questions about legal jurisdiction. WikiLeaks was thus able to bring its site online again. The bank dropped the case on 5 March 2008. The judge also denied the bank's request for an order prohibiting the website's publication.

== Indian IT Ministry legal dispute ==
On 15 February 2023, Delhi High Court ordered Indian IT Ministry to block Dynadot and other domain registrars from being accessed in India over cybersquatting (traditionally handled via UDRP-type proceedings instead of state-level law) and not complying with Indian IT Rules, 2021. Dynadot was later unblocked.
