= V. C. vs. Slovakia =

V.C. vs Slovakia was the first case in which the European Court for Human Rights ruled in favor of a Romani woman who was a victim of forced sterilization in the state hospital in Slovakia. It is one of many cases of forced sterilization of Roma women brought to the Court by the Slovak feminist group Center for Civil and Human Rights from Košice.

The woman, known by the initials V.C., was forcibly sterilized in the state hospital, Prešov Hospital, in Eastern Slovakia on 23 August 2000, during the delivery of her second child. According to her medical records, shortly before her delivery was terminated by caesarean section, and while she was in labour and having contractions every three minutes, the hospital staff pressured her to sign a one sentence declaration as "a request for sterilization". She was told that unless she signed that declaration, she or her baby would die. V.C. did not understand what sterilization meant but she signed nonetheless, in fear for her life. She was sterilized during the procedure.

Later, she learned that the sterilization was not necessary for saving her life, since it is merely a form of contraception. V.C. was greatly traumatized by the forced sterilization. Her husband divorced her, she was ostracized by the community, experienced a hysterical pregnancy, and had to undergo psychiatric counselling.

In 2004, V.C. sued for damages from the Prešov hospital in Slovak courts, including the Constitutional Court of Slovakia. All her petitions were rejected. In 2007, she brought a complaint against Slovakia to the European Court. The European Court held a hearing into the case on 22 March 2011. On 8 November 2011 the Court found a violation of her rights; her right to freedom from inhuman and degrading treatment (under Article 3 of the European Convention on Human Rights) and the right to private and family life (under Article 8 of the Convention). The Court rejected the claims of the Slovak Government that sterilization was "medically necessary" since sterilization is not a life-saving surgery and V.C.'s informed consent was needed. In the court's view, the approach of the Prešov Hospital was not compatible with the Convention as it did not permit V.C. to take a decision of her own free will, after consideration of all the relevant issues.

The Slovak Government was ordered to pay V.C. compensation of 31,000 EUR and reimbursement of her legal costs.

== Sources ==
- Judgement of the European Court of 8 November 2011 on Application no. 18968/07
- Record of the hearing at the European Court of Human Rights on 22 March 2011
