= Indictment and arrest of Julian Assange =

Sealed US indictment of Julian Assange, returned 6 March 2018, released on 11 April 2019

In 2012, while on bail, Julian Assange was granted political asylum in the Ecuadorian Embassy in London, where he sought to avoid extradition to Sweden, and what his supporters said was the possibility of subsequent extradition to the US. On 11 April 2019, Ecuador revoked his asylum, he was arrested for failing to appear in court, and carried out of the embassy by members of the London Metropolitan Police. Following his arrest, he was charged and convicted, on 1 May 2019, of violating the Bail Act, and sentenced to fifty weeks in prison. While in prison the US revealed a previously sealed 2018 US indictment in which Assange was charged with conspiracy to commit computer intrusion related to his involvement with Chelsea Manning and WikiLeaks.

On 23 May 2019, a US grand jury added 17 espionage charges also related to his involvement with Chelsea Manning, making a total of 18 federal charges against Assange in the US. On 25 June 2020 a new indictment was filed alleging that since 2009, Assange had attempted to recruit hackers and system administrators at conferences around the world and conspired with hackers including members of LulzSec and Anonymous. The new indictment described Assange's alleged efforts to recruit system administrators, Assange and WikiLeaks' role in helping Edward Snowden flee the US, and their use of Snowden as a recruitment tool, and WikiLeaks' exploiting a vulnerability in the United States Congress' system to access and publish the Congressional Research Service reports. Assange's defenders have responded to U.S. accusations, describing him as a journalist who did nothing more than publish leaked information that embarrassed the U.S. government.

While there was support from some American journalism institutions and from bi-partisan politicians for Assange's arrest and indictment, several non-government organisations for press freedom condemned it. The New York Times's editorial board warned that "The administration has begun well by charging Mr. Assange with an indisputable crime. But there is always a risk with this administration — one that labels the free press as “the enemy of the people” — that the prosecution of Mr. Assange could become an assault on the First Amendment and whistle-blowers." The case was dismissed in June 2024 after Assange pleaded guilty to a charge of “conspiracy to obtain and disclose national defence information” as part of a plea deal which, due to time already served, resulted in his release from prison.

== Background ==
=== Publication of material from Manning ===
In 2010 while working with WikiLeaks, Assange was contacted by Chelsea Manning (then Bradley Manning), who gave him classified information containing various military operations conducted by the US government abroad. The material included the Baghdad airstrike of 2007, Granai Airstrike of 2009, the Iraq War Logs, Afghan War Diaries, and the Afghan War Logs, among others. Some of these documents were published by WikiLeaks and leaked to other major media houses including The Guardian between 2010 and 2011.

Critics of the release included Julia Gillard, then Australian Prime Minister, who said the act was illegal, and the vice-president of the United States, Joe Biden, who called him a terrorist. Others, including Brazilian president Luiz da Silva and Ecuadorean president Rafael Correa, supported his actions, while sources in Russian president Dmitry Medvedev's office said he deserved a Nobel prize for his actions. The Manning leaks also led WikiLeaks and Julian Assange to receive various accolades and awards, but at the same time attracted criticism and police investigations.

=== Criminal investigation and indictment ===
Following the Manning leaks, authorities in the US began investigating Assange and WikiLeaks. Assange broke bail to avoid extradition to Sweden, where he was wanted for questioning in connection with an arrest warrant for one charge of unlawful coercion, two charges of sexual molestation, and one charge of rape, and became a fugitive. The Australian government distanced itself from Assange.

In 2012, he sought and gained political asylum from Ecuador, granted by Rafael Correa, after visiting the country's embassy in London.

At the same time, an investigation by the FBI was going on regarding Assange's release of the Manning documents, and according to court documents dated May 2014, he was still under active and ongoing investigation. A warrant issued to Google by the district court cited several crimes, including espionage, conspiracy to commit espionage, theft or conversion of property belonging to the United States government, violation of the Computer Fraud and Abuse Act and general conspiracy.

An indictment against Assange was filed on 6 March 2018 and remained sealed until 11 April 2019.

In February 2019, Chelsea Manning was subpoenaed to appear before a grand jury in Virginia in the case. When Manning condemned the secrecy of the hearings and refused to testify, she was jailed for contempt of court on 8 March 2019. On 16 May 2019, Manning refused to testify before a new grand jury investigating Assange, stating that she "believe[d] this grand jury seeks to undermine the integrity of public discourse with the aim of punishing those who expose any serious, ongoing, and systemic abuses of power by this government". She was returned to jail for the 18-month term of the grand jury with financial penalties. In June 2021, Chelsea Manning said her grand jury resistance was not contingent on Assange being the target, and that she was not even sure he was. "I treated this no differently than if it was for a protest or for some other grand jury—if it was a grand jury in general, I would respond the same way. But it did appear that this one was about, specifically, the 2010 disclosures; the media was speculating, but our legal team and ourselves, we never got full confirmation as to whether that was the case."

=== Before Assange's arrest ===
On 2 April 2019, Ecuador's president Moreno said that Assange had violated the terms of his asylum, after photos surfaced on the internet linking Moreno to a corruption scandal. WikiLeaks said it merely reported on a corruption investigation against Moreno by Ecuador's legislature. WikiLeaks reported a source within the Ecuadorian government saying that, due to the controversy, an agreement had been reached to expel Assange from the embassy and place him in the custody of UK police. According to Assange's father, Ecuador revoked Assange's asylum as part of a deal with the U.S. to receive a loan from the International Monetary Fund.

== Arrest by the Metropolitan Police ==
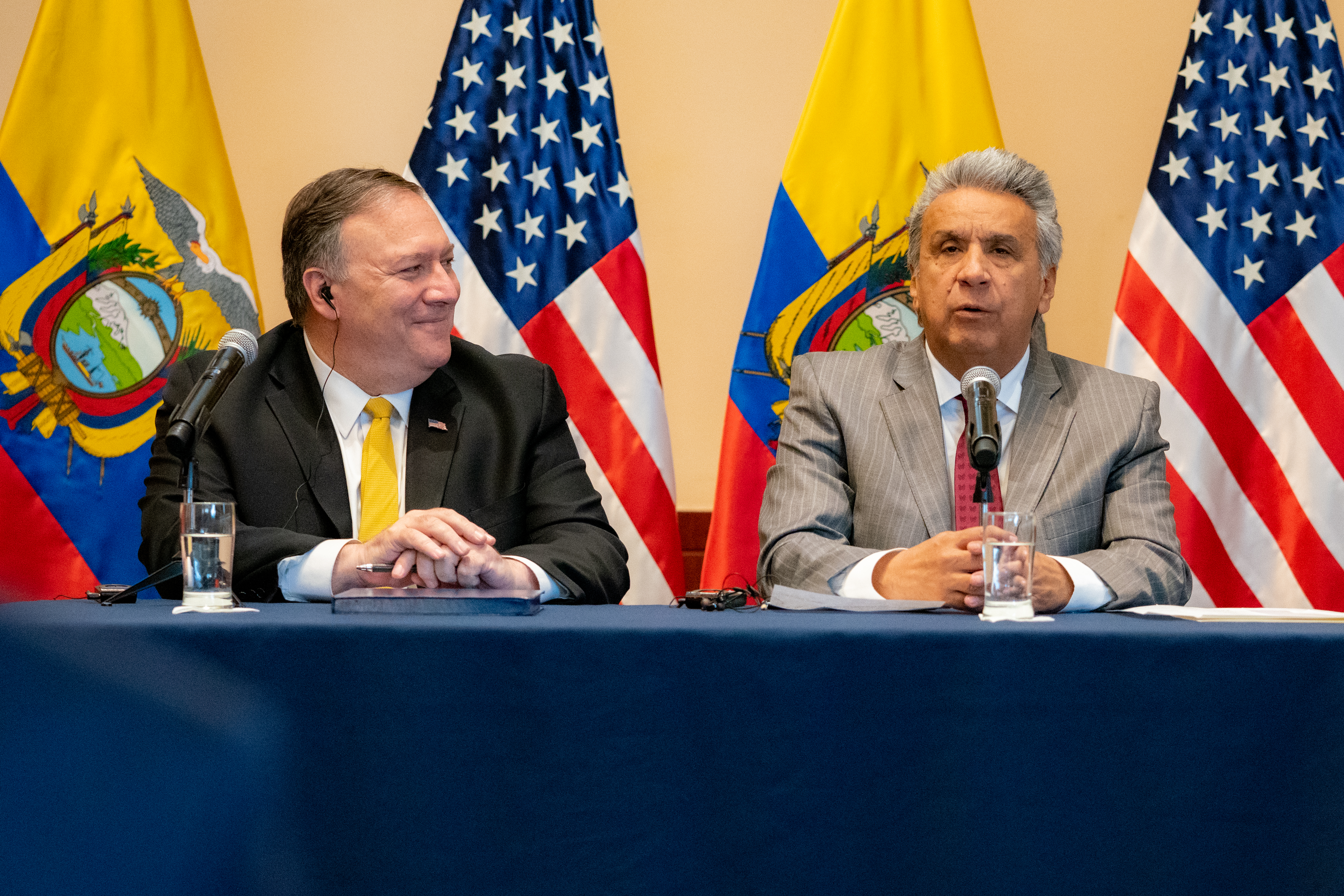
Ecuadorian president Lenin Moreno with U.S. secretary of state Mike Pompeo, 20 July 2019

Following the revocation of Assange's asylum, on 11 April 2019 the ambassador of Ecuador to the UK extended an invitation to the Metropolitan Police to enter the embassy where he had been living since 2012. Subsequently, Assange was apprehended and transported to a police station in central London and charged with breaching the Bail Act 1976.

Foreign Minister José Valencia said an audio recording captured Assange threatening Ambassador Jaime Merchan with a panic button that he said would bring devastating consequences for the embassy in the event of his arrest. Ecuador's authorities shared the threat with British authorities and when arresting Assange they were careful to not let him trigger any possible emergency plans. Moreno accused Assange of installing electronic distortion equipment in the embassy, blocking security cameras, mistreating guards and accessing security files without permission and stated that Ecuador withdrew Assange's asylum after he interfered in Ecuador's domestic affairs. Moreno added that "the patience of Ecuador has reached its limit on the behaviour of Mr. Assange" and Foreign minister José Valencia listed nine reasons why Assange's asylum was withdrawn, and said Ecuador had no choice after Assange's "innumerable acts of interference in the politics of other states".

Assange was carrying Gore Vidal's History of the National Security State during his forcible removal from the embassy and shouted "the UK has no sovereignty" and "the UK must resist this attempt by the Trump administration ... " as five police officers put him into a van. The news of the arrest went viral within minutes and several media outlets reported it as breaking news. President Moreno called Assange a "spoiled brat" in the wake of the arrest.

CNN reported that "British police entered the Ecuadorian Embassy in London... forcibly removing the WikiLeaks founder Julian Assange on a US extradition warrant and bringing his seven-year stint there to a dramatic close."

=== Conviction for breach of bail ===
At a hearing at Westminster Magistrates' Court a few hours after his arrest, the presiding judge found Assange was guilty of breaching the terms of his bail.

Assange's defence said chief magistrate Emma Arbuthnot, who had dealt with his case, was biased against him as her husband, a former MP and Chairman of Defence Select Committee, was directly affected by WikiLeaks' allegations. According to an article by Mark Curtis and Matt Kennard in the Daily Maverick, Emma Arbuthnot's husband, James Arbuthnot, "has financial links to the British military establishment, including institutions and individuals exposed by WikiLeaks". The Intercept reported that Emma Arbuthnot's husband and son had "links to people cited for criminal activities in documents published by WikiLeaks" and that her family had "additional connections to the intelligence services and defense industries". Judge Michael Snow said it was "unacceptable" to air the claim in front of a "packed press gallery" and that Assange's "assertion that he has not had a fair hearing is laughable. And his behaviour is that of a narcissist who cannot get beyond his own selfish interests." Judge Snow also said "He has chosen not to give evidence, he has chosen to make assertions about a senior judge not having the courage to place himself before the court for the purpose of cross-examination. Those assertions made through counsel are not evidence as a matter of law. I find they are not capable of amounting to a reasonable excuse."

Assange was remanded to Belmarsh Prison, and on 1 May 2019 was sentenced to 50 weeks imprisonment. The judge said he would be released after serving half of his sentence, subject to other proceedings and conditional upon committing no further offences. The United Nations Working Group on Arbitrary Detention said that the verdict contravened "principles of necessity and proportionality" for what it considered a "minor violation". Assange appealed against his sentence, but dropped his appeal in July.

Judge Deborah Taylor said Assange's time in the embassy had cost British taxpayers the equivalent of nearly $21 million, and that he had sought asylum in a "deliberate attempt to delay justice."

Assange offered a written apology in court, stating that his actions were a response to terrifying circumstances. He said he had been effectively imprisoned in the embassy; two doctors also provided medical evidence of the mental and physical effects of being confined. To which the judge Deborah Taylor said "You were not living under prison conditions, and you could have left at any time to face due process with the rights and protections which the legal system in this country provides".

== Indictments by the Department of Justice ==
=== Accidental revelation ===
In 2012 and 2013, US officials indicated that Assange was not named in a sealed indictment. On 6 March 2018, a federal grand jury for the Eastern District of Virginia issued a sealed indictment against Assange. In November 2018, US prosecutors accidentally revealed that Assange had been indicted under seal in US federal court; the revelation came as a result of an error in a different court filing, unrelated to Assange.

=== First indictment ===
==== Charge of conspiracy to commit computer intrusion ====
On 11 April 2019, the day of Assange's arrest in London, the indictment against him was unsealed. He was charged with conspiracy to commit computer intrusion (i.e. hacking into a government computer), a crime that carries a maximum 5-year sentence.

The charges allege that Assange sought to help Chelsea Manning crack a password hash so that Manning could use a different username to download classified documents. This "would have made it more difficult for investigators to identify Manning as the source of disclosures of classified information". This allegation had been known since 2011 and is a less serious charge than those levelled against Manning, and carries a maximum sentence of five years. The US pointed to chat logs and filed an affidavit that said they were able to identify Assange as the person chatting with Manning using hints he made during the chats and that Manning identified him as Assange to Adrian Lamo.

=== Superseding indictment ===
==== Charges under the Espionage Act ====
On 23 May 2019, Assange was indicted on 17 new charges relating to the Espionage Act of 1917 in the United States District Court for the Eastern District of Virginia. The charges carried a maximum sentence of 170 years in prison:

- Conspiracy to obtain and disclose national defence information;
- Conspiracy to commit computer intrusions;
- Obtaining national defence information (seven counts); and
- Disclosure of national defence information (nine counts).

The charges are related to his involvement with Chelsea Manning, a former US Army intelligence analyst who gave Assange classified information concerning matters surrounding the US Defense Department. The new charges relate to obtaining and publishing the secret documents. The three charges related to publication concern documents which revealed the names of sources in dangerous places putting them "at a grave and imminent risk" of harm or detention.

On 25 March 2020, a London court denied Assange bail, after Judge Vanessa Baraitser rejected his lawyers' argument that his stay in prison would put him at high risk of contracting COVID-19 due to his previous respiratory tract infections and a heart problem. Judge Baraitser said that Assange's past conduct showed how far he was willing to go to avoid extradition to the United States.

=== Second superseding indictment ===
In late June 2020, a grand jury expanded the indictment against Assange they said "broaden[s] the scope of... alleged computer intrusions", alleging that Assange recruited and conspired with hackers, encouraging them to hack to get information for WikiLeaks. Assange allegedly told the Hacking At Random conference that WikiLeaks had obtained nonpublic documents from the Congressional Research Service by exploiting "a small vulnerability" in the United States Congress' document distribution system, telling them "[t]his is what any one of you would find if you were actually looking." The charging document also accused Assange of "gaining unauthorised access to a government computer system of a NATO country in 2010" and in 2012 of conspiring with hackers including members of LulzSec and Anonymous. The indictment also described Assange and WikiLeak's alleged efforts to recruit system administrators to be sources, and Assange and WikiLeaks' role in helping Snowden flee the US, and their use of Snowden as a recruitment tool.

== Aftermath ==
=== Extradition hearings ===
The U.S. acts through the UK Crown Prosecution Service (CPS) in its extradition case against Assange. On 15 September 2017, The Wall Street Journal reported that Dana Rohrabacher had acted as a go between of the White House and Julian Assange to obtain a pardon for Assange. On 25 October 2018, Mother Jones reported that Randy Credico had received text messages from Roger Stone on 6 January 2018 stating that Stone was seeking a presidential pardon from Donald Trump for Assange. On 25 February 2020, one of the barristers representing Assange, Edward Fitzgerald revealed to District Judge Vanessa Baraitser that Dana Rohrabacher, as an emissary of President Donald Trump, had offered Assange a pardon from President Trump, if Assange could offer material identifying the source of email leaks from the Democratic National Committee during 2016.

In October 2021, US authorities told a British judge that if convicted, Assange could serve any prison sentence in Australia and that he "has no history of serious and enduring mental illness". On 20 April 2022, a British judge formally issued Assange's extradition order. The decision was sent to the UK government, where the home secretary Priti Patel was to finalise his transfer to the US. Assange can appeal the decision by judicial review, if it is approved by Patel. On 18 June 2022, Patel approved the decision to extradite Assange in the United States; Assange announced that he would appeal the decision. On 22 August 2022, Assange's legal team lodged a Perfected Grounds of Appeal before the High Court challenging District Judge Vanessa Baraitser's decision of 4 January 2021 with new evidence. In November 2022, he made a further appeal to the European Court of Human Rights, but on 13 December 2022, this appeal was declared inadmissible. On 26 March 2024, the United Kingdom's High Court grants WikiLeaks founder Julian Assange a stay of extradition to the United States and demands that the United States not consider the death penalty against Assange if he is sent to the United States to face espionage charges. US extradition requests would be cancelled following Assange's guilty plea and release.

=== Reactions to the indictment ===
While some US politicians supported the arrest and indictment of Julian Assange, several jurists, politicians, associations, academics and campaigners viewed the arrest of Assange as an attack on freedom of the press and international law. Reporters Without Borders said Assange's arrest could "set a dangerous precedent for journalists, whistle-blowers, and other journalistic sources that the US may wish to pursue in the future." Kenneth Roth, executive director of Human Rights Watch, wrote that Assange's prosecution for publishing leaked documents is "a major threat to global media freedom". United Nations rights expert Agnes Callamard said the arrest of Assange "exposed him to the risk of serious human rights violations, if extradited to the United States". The yellow vests movement called for Assange's release.

==== Reactions in the UK and the EU ====
Dutch senator Tiny Kox (Socialist Party) asked the Council of Europe's commissioner for human rights, Dunja Mijatović, whether the arrest of Assange and his possible extradition to the US were in line with the criteria of the European Convention on Human Rights. In January 2020, the Parliamentary Assembly of the Council of Europe voted to oppose Assange's extradition to the US.

In 2019, British Labour Party leader Jeremy Corbyn said that Assange had revealed "evidence of atrocities in Iraq and Afghanistan" and his extradition to the United States "should be opposed by the British government". In February 2020, Corbyn again praised Assange, demanding a halt to the extradition. Prime Minister Boris Johnson responded vaguely with "it’s obvious that the rights of journalists and whistleblowers should be upheld and this government will continue to do that.”

Eva Joly, magistrate and MEP for Europe Ecology–The Greens, said that "the arrest of Julian Assange is an attack on freedom of expression, international law and right to asylum". Sevim Dagdelen, a German Bundestag MP for The Left who specialises in international law and press law, describes Assange's arrest as "an attack on independent journalism" and says that he "is today seriously endangered". Dick Marty, a former state prosecutor of Ticino and rapporteur on the CIA's secret prisons for the Council of Europe, considers the arrest of whistleblowers "very shocking". Several well-known Swiss jurists have asked the Federal Council to grant asylum to the founder of WikiLeaks because he is threatened with extradition to the United States, which in the past "silenced whistleblowers".

In 2019, The Economist published an editorial arguing that Assange should be extradited. In a letter, the two French Unions of Journalists (Syndicat national des journalistes (CGT)) and (Syndicat national des journalistes (CFDT)) asked Emmanuel Macron to enforce Article 10 of the European Convention on Human Rights. According them, "Faced with threats to Julian Assange's health and at the risk of seeing him sentenced to life imprisonment, we are saying loud and clear, with the IFJ (Fédération internationale des journalistes) that 'journalism is not a crime'". They add:

Julian Assange denounced in his publications war crimes condemned by the Geneva Convention. Today, he is the one we would like to imprison, we would like to silence. ... We consider this case one of the most serious attacks on the freedom of the press, against public freedoms within the EU. The IFJ, the French unions and their Australian counterparts have launched a motion to seize this serious case the UN Human Rights Council and the European Parliament and the Council of Europe.

WikiLeaks was recognised as a "media organisation" in 2017 by a UK tribunal, contradicting public assertions to the contrary by some US officials, and possibly supporting Assange's efforts to oppose his extradition to the United States.

According to Amnesty International's Massimo Moratti, if extradited to the United States, Assange may face the "risk of serious human rights violations, namely detention conditions, which could violate the prohibition of torture".

==== Reactions in the US ====
While there was support from some American journalism institutions and from bi-partisan politicians for Assange's arrest and indictment, several non-government organisations for press freedom condemned it. Mark Warner, vice-chairman of the United States Senate Select Committee on Intelligence, said that Assange was "a dedicated accomplice in efforts to undermine American security". Senate Judiciary Committee Chairman Lindsey Graham and Senator Joe Manchin also spoke in support of the arrest and indictment.

After Assange's arrest and first indictment, the New York Times' Editorial Board wrote that "The case of Mr. Assange, who got his start as a computer hacker, illuminates the conflict of freedom and harm in the new technologies, and could help draw a sharp line between legitimate journalism and dangerous cybercrime." The editorial board also warned that "The administration has begun well by charging Mr. Assange with an indisputable crime. But there is always a risk with this administration — one that labels the free press as 'the enemy of the people' — that the prosecution of Mr. Assange could become an assault on the First Amendment and whistle-blowers." The Washington Post's editorial board wrote that Assange was "not a free-press hero" or a journalist, and that he was "long overdue for personal accountability."

Frida Ghitis warned that "while Assange is not a journalist, his arrest does present a potential threat to other journalists. One can easily foresee someone like President Donald Trump using the precedent against others reporting information he doesn't like. If a man who claims he is a journalist can be arrested and prosecuted for his work, others could also be charged."

The Associated Press reported that the indictment raised concerns about media freedom, as Assange's solicitation and publication of classified information is a routine job journalists perform. Stephen Vladeck, a professor at the University of Texas School of Law, stated that what Assange is accused of doing is factually different from, but legally similar to what professional journalists do. Vladeck also said the Espionage Act charges could provide Assange with an argument against extradition under the US-UK treaty, as there is an exemption in the treaty for political offences. Suzanne Nossel of PEN America said it was immaterial if Assange was a journalist or publisher and pointed instead to First Amendment concerns.

In a call with reporters, U.S. Attorney Terwilliger said that "Assange is charged for his alleged complicity in illegal acts to obtain or receive voluminous databases of classified information and for agreeing and attempting to obtain classified information through computer hacking. The United States has not charged Assange for passively obtaining or receiving classified information." Assistant Attorney General John Demers said "Julian Assange is no journalist".

Most cases brought under the Espionage Act have been against government employees who accessed sensitive information and leaked it to journalists and others. Prosecuting people for acts related to receiving and publishing information has not previously been tested in court. Gabe Rottman from the Reporters Committee for Freedom of the Press, said there were a few occasions when the U.S. government had almost charged a journalist under the Espionage Act, but had decided not to proceed. He mentioned the case of Seymour Hersh, whom the Justice Department decided after consideration not to charge for reporting on US surveillance of the Soviet Union. BuzzFeed News wrote that lawyers to whom it had spoken said there was only one previous case in which third parties were prosecuted for sharing leaked information. In that case, two lobbyists for a pro-Israel group were charged in 2005 with receiving and sharing classified information about American policy toward Iran. The charges, however, did not relate to the publication of the documents and the case was dropped in 2009.

The Obama administration had debated charging Assange under the Espionage Act, but decided against it out of fear that it would have a negative effect on investigative journalism and could be unconstitutional. The New York Times commented that it and other news organisations obtained the same documents as WikiLeaks also without government authorisation. It said it was not clear how WikiLeaks' publications were legally different from other publications of classified information.

The US allegation that Assange's publication of these secrets was illegal was deemed controversial by Australia's Seven News as well as CNN. The Cato Institute also questioned the US government's position which attempts to position Assange as not a journalist. Forbes magazine stated that the US government created an outcry among journalists in its indictment of Assange as the US sought to debate whether Assange was a journalist or not.

The deputy director of the Committee to Protect Journalists, Robert Mahoney, said "With this prosecution of Julian Assange, the US government could set out broad legal arguments about journalists soliciting information or interacting with sources that could have chilling consequences for investigative reporting and the publication of information of public interest." According to Yochai Benkler, a Harvard law professor, the charge sheet contained some "very dangerous elements that pose significant risk to national security reporting. Sections of the indictment are vastly overbroad and could have a significant chilling effect – they ought to be rejected." Carrie DeCell, staff attorney with the Knight First Amendment Institute at Columbia University, said the charges "risk having a chill on journalism". She added, "Many of the allegations fall absolutely within the first amendment's protections of journalistic activity. That's very troubling to us."

Ben Wizner from the American Civil Liberties Union (ACLU) said that if authorities were to prosecute Assange "for violating US secrecy laws [it] would set an especially dangerous precedent for US journalists, who routinely violate foreign secrecy laws to deliver information vital to the public's interest." BuzzFeed reported that most cases brought under the Espionage Act have been against government employees who accessed sensitive information and leaked it to journalists and others. According to the New York Times, prosecuting people for acts related to receiving and publishing information has not previously been tested in court.

NSA whistleblower Edward Snowden and the Pentagon Papers whistleblower Daniel Ellsberg condemned the indictment. Snowden tweeted that "Assange's critics may cheer, but this is a dark moment for press freedom." Daniel Ellsberg said:

Forty-eight years ago, I was the first journalistic source to be indicted. There have been perhaps a dozen since then, nine under President Obama. But Julian Assange is the first journalist to be indicted. If he is extradited to the U.S. and convicted, he will not be the last. The First Amendment is a pillar of our democracy and this is an assault on it. If freedom of speech is violated to this extent, our republic is in danger. Unauthorized disclosures are the lifeblood of the republic.

According to Ron Paul, Assange should receive the same kind of protections as the mainstream media when it comes to releasing information. He said "In a free society we're supposed to know the truth ... In a society where truth becomes treason, then we're in big trouble. And now, people who are revealing the truth are getting into trouble for it." He added "This is media, isn't it? I mean, why don't we prosecute The New York Times or anybody that releases this?"

Ecuadorian president Lenín Moreno, the Australian prime minister Scott Morrison, the British foreign secretary, Jeremy Hunt, U.S. Senators Mark Warner, Lindsey Graham and Joe Manchin, and British prime minister Theresa May, who commented that "no one is above the law," supported the arrest. Alternatively, it has been asserted that such a move would be a threat to freedom of speech as protected by the First Amendment to the United States Constitution. This view is held by Edward Snowden, Rafael Correa, Chelsea Manning, Jeremy Corbyn, Kenneth Roth of Human Rights Watch, and Glenn Greenwald, who said "it's the criminalization of journalism".

The president of the Center for American Progress and former Obama aide Neera Tanden also welcomed the arrest and condemned Assange's leftist supporters, tweeting that "the Assange cultists are the worst. Assange was the agent of a proto-fascist state, Russia, to undermine democracy. That is fascist behaviour. Anyone on the left should abhor what he did." Freedom of the Press Foundation said: "Whether or not you like Assange, the charge against him is a serious press freedom threat and should be vigorously protested by all those who care about the first amendment."

==== Reactions in Australia ====
In October 2019, former deputy prime minister Barnaby Joyce (National Party of Australia) called for the federal government to take action to stop Assange being extradited from the United Kingdom to the US. Later in October, the cross-party Bring Assange Home Parliamentary Working Group was established. Its co-chairs are independent Andrew Wilkie and Liberal National MP George Christensen. Its members include Greens Richard Di Natale, Adam Bandt and Peter Whish-Wilson, Centre Alliance MPs Rebekha Sharkie and Rex Patrick and independent Zali Steggall.

In the lead up to an extradition hearing on 1 June 2020, more than 100 politicians, journalists, lawyers and human rights activists from Australia wrote to Foreign Minister Marise Payne, asking her to make urgent representations to the UK government to have Assange released on bail due to his ill-health.

In April 2023, several Australian politicians, including Andrew Wilkie, Adam Bandt, and Rebekha Sharkie, urged United States attorney general Merrick Garland to abandon the extradition of Julian Assange to the United States. The politicians argued that Assange's extradition would set a dangerous precedent for the freedom of the press and called for his release from prison in the UK where he is currently being held.

==== Other reactions ====
Former Ecuadorian president Rafael Correa condemned Assange's arrest. Former Bolivian president Evo Morales also condemned it. Maria Zakharova, spokesperson for the Russian Ministry of Foreign Affairs, condemned the indictment. The then-ex-president of Brazil Luiz Inácio Lula da Silva said that "Humanity should demand its freedom. Instead of being imprisoned he should be treated like a hero", during his visit in Genebra.

Ecuadorean president Lenín Moreno said in a video posted on Twitter that he "requested Great Britain to guarantee that Mr Assange would not be extradited to a country where he could face torture or the death penalty. The British government has confirmed it in writing, in accordance with its own rules." On 14 April 2019 Moreno stated in an interview with the British newspaper The Guardian that no other nation influenced his government's decision to revoke Assange's asylum in the embassy and that Assange did in fact use facilities in the embassy "to interfere in processes of other states." Moreno also stated "we can not allow our house, the house that opened its doors, to become a centre for spying" and noted that Assange also had poor hygiene. Moreno further stated "We never tried to expel Assange, as some political actors want everyone to believe. Given the constant violations of protocols and threats, political asylum became untenable."

On Assange's birthday in July 2020, 40 organisations, including the International Federation of Journalists, the National Union of Journalists, the National Lawyers Guild, the International Association of Democratic Lawyers, the Centre for Investigative Journalism and the World Association of Community Radio Broadcasters, wrote an open letter demanding that Assange be released.

There was widespread criticism that the second Assange indictment, which added Espionage charges, violated the First Amendment. Multiple organisations and journalists criticised the new charges.

- The New York Times stated: "Julian Assange, the WikiLeaks leader, was indicted on 17 counts of violating the Espionage Act for his role in obtaining and publishing secret military and diplomatic documents in 2010, the Justice Department announced on Thursday — a novel case that raises profound First Amendment issues."
- The Guardian said: "By bringing new charges against the WikiLeaks founder, the Trump administration has challenged the first amendment."
- HuffPost said: "The charges against the WikiLeaks founder bring up huge First Amendment issues."
- The Nation said: "The Indictment of Julian Assange Is a Threat to Press Freedom."
- The American Civil Liberties Union said: "For the first time in the history of our country, the government has brought criminal charges under the Espionage Act against a publisher for the publication of truthful information. This is a direct assault on the First Amendment."
- Jonathan Turley described the Assange indictment under the Espionage Act of 1917 as "the most important press freedom case in the US in 300 years".

In his book The Trial of Julian Assange: A Story of Persecution, which Andrew Billen described as pro-Assange, Nils Melzer wrote that the legal delays in Assange's extradition case are strategic: "The US is in no hurry to bring the extradition proceedings to a conclusion. The longer every procedural step can be spun out, the more Assange’s health and stability will deteriorate and the stronger the deterrent effect on other journalists and whistleblowers".

== Plea bargain and release ==
Superseding indictment as part of the plea bargain filed with the District Court for the Northern Mariana Islands.

In a plea bargain agreed on 24 June 2024, Assange would plead guilty to one count of violating the Espionage Act in exchange for immediate release. The agreement entailed the US Department of Justice seeking a sentence of 62 months, the time he had served in British prison while awaiting extradition; this allowed for Assange's immediate release from the UK to attend the plea hearing. On 26 June, at around 9:45 am local time, Assange pleaded guilty in the Saipan federal territorial courthouse of the District Court for the Northern Mariana Islands to conspiracy to obtain and disclose national defense information. Judge Ramona Villagomez Manglona accepted Assange's guilty plea and sentenced him as planned. Assange immediately travelled to Canberra, with former Australian prime minister and ambassador to the US Kevin Rudd, arriving at around 7:35 pm local time.

Assange was required by the Australian government to repay the costs of the charter flight for his transfer from the United Kingdom to Saipan as he was not permitted to fly on commercial airlines. The total amount requested by the Australian government for the charter flight stands at £410,000. According to experts and human rights organisations, this marks the first time the US has charged a nongovernmental official with publishing secret documents and sets a journalistic precedent for press freedom. According to Jameel Jaffer, executive director of the Knight First Amendment Institute at Columbia University, the plea deal "would avert the worst-case scenario for press freedom, but this deal contemplates that Assange will have served five years in prison for activities that journalists engage in every day. It will cast a long shadow over the most important kinds of journalism, not just in this country but around the world." Assange's agreement with the plea deal evades the possibility of an endorsement from the Supreme Court of the United States based on the case.

== See also ==
- Assange v Swedish Prosecution Authority
- 2012-2013 Ecuador–United Kingdom diplomatic crisis
- Surveillance of Julian Assange
