= Kunstler v. Central Intelligence Agency =

Civil rights lawsuit against the CIA

Kunstler v. Central Intelligence Agency is a lawsuit against the Central Intelligence Agency, former CIA Director Mike Pompeo, Undercover Global S.L., and David Morales Guillen filed by a group of American lawyers and journalists associated with WikiLeaks founder Julian Assange. The lawsuit alleged that the CIA violated their constitutional rights by recording their conversations with Assange and copying their devices after suspicions were raised that Assange was working for the Russian intelligence services.

The lawsuit was filed in August 2022 in the United States southern district of New York's District Court by lawyers Margaret Kunstler and Deborah Hrbek, and journalists Charles Glass and John Goetz. The lawsuit alleged that the CIA worked with David Morales and Spanish firm "Undercover Global" (UC Global), to spy on Assange. UC Global provided security to the Ecuadorian embassy where Assange had asylum. In January 2023, an amended complaint was filed that requested any information collected be destroyed. The CIA lodged a motion for the lawsuit to be dismissed and in December 2023, U.S. District Court Judge John Koeltl ruled that the lawsuit can proceed. Koeltl dismissed portions of the lawsuit, including allegations that the CIA violated the plaintiffs' rights by surveilling their conversations at the embassy. Koeltl ruled that, if the CIA accessed the contents of the plaintiffs' phones, then it had breached their privacy rights under the U.S. Constitution.

According to the lawsuit, the CIA recruited UC Global in 2017 through officials from the Las Vegas Sands casino group, which was controlled by Sheldon Adelson who the suit alleges "had cooperated with the CIA on similar matters in the past." UC Global provided security for the embassy and required guests to sign in and leave electronic devices with guards before visiting Assange. The information was allegedly copied and sent to the CIA, with Pompeo's knowledge and approval. UC Global also allegedly sent recordings from security cameras and microphones secretly placed around the embassy to the CIA. Previous filings by Assange's lawyers in Spanish courts had also named Zohar Lahav and Brian Nagel of Las Vegas Sands and alleged that the surveillance continued under Promsecurity after UC Global's contract ended.

Morales has denied working for the CIA and said that the surveillance was done at the request of Ecuador's government. In April 2019, El Pais quoted him as saying that "The situation Assange is in is not easy because of his emotional state. Throughout the length of his stay, he has gone through different stages in which he was more or less in agreement with the [security and surveillance] procedures, but that is an area that does not correspond to him, but rather the client." At a press conference in New York, the lawyers representing Assange's associates said that Ecuador was unaware of the surveillance. The lawyers allege that the surveillance violated the rights of more than 100 US citizens.

In November 2022, Mike Pompeo was served while in front of a greenscreen.

CIA Director William J. Burns to subpoenaed to testify in the case. In April 2024, he lodged a statement that, under the National Security Act of 1947 and the Central Intelligence Agency Act of 1949, he could not provide information because it could cause "serious — and in some cases, exceptionally grave — damage to the national security of the United States". In February 2025 Koeltl dismissed the lawsuit, stating that the CIA properly invoked the state secrets privilege.

== Surveillance of Assange ==
In 2015, Cynthia Viteri and Fernando Villavicencio sent secret documents to WikiLeaks showing that Ecuador was using an Italian company to run a surveillance program that was spying on journalists and political enemies, in addition to spying on Assange in the embassy. The New York Times reported that leaked chat logs from 2015 show that Assange and his inner circle were aware of the documents, which were not published by WikiLeaks.

In May 2018, The Guardian reported that over five years Ecuador had spent at least $5 million (£3.7m) to protect and surveil Assange, employing a security company and undercover agents to monitor him, his visitors, embassy staff and the British police as part of Operation Guest and Operation Hotel. New CCTV cameras were installed in the embassy soon after Assange moved in, and security personnel recorded his activities and interactions with staff, his legal team and other visitors in minute detail. Assange was questioned about visitors, who were required to leave their passports with security, which was used to create profiles of the visitors with details of the visit.

The Guardian reported that in 2014, the company hired to monitor Assange warned Ecuador's government that he was "intercepting and gathering information from the embassy and the people who worked there" and that he had compromised the embassy's communications system. WikiLeaks described the allegation as "an anonymous libel aligned with the current UK-US government onslaught against Mr Assange". The Ecuadorian ambassador to the UK, Juan Falconí Puig, was unaware of the operation until a bill went to the embassy in May 2015 and Ecuadorian foreign minister Ricardo Patiño had to explain the situation to the ambassador.

On 10 April 2019, WikiLeaks said it had uncovered an extensive surveillance operation against Assange from within the embassy. WikiLeaks said that "material including video, audio, copies of private legal documents and a medical report" had surfaced in Spain and that unnamed individuals in Madrid had made an extortion attempt and threatened to make the information public unless they were paid €3 million. After Assange was expelled from the embassy, foreign minister José Valencia said that Assange "permanently accused [embassy] staff of spying on and filming him" for the United States.

On 26 September 2019, the Spanish newspaper El País reported that the Spanish defence and security company Undercover Global S.L. had spied on Assange during his time in the embassy, allegedly for the CIA. UC Global had been contracted to protect the embassy during this time. According to the report UC Global's owner David Morales had supposedly provided the CIA with audio and video of meetings Assange held with his lawyers and colleagues. Morales also arranged for the US to have direct access to the stream from video cameras installed in the embassy at the beginning of December 2017. The evidence was part of a secret investigation by Spain's High Court, the Audiencia Nacional, into Morales and his relationship with US intelligence. The investigation was precipitated by a complaint by Assange that accused UC Global of violating his privacy and client-attorney privileges as well as committing misappropriation, bribery and money laundering.

In a November 2019 article, El País reported that David Morales had been in Alexandria in early March 2017, around the time that WikiLeaks had announced the publication of Vault 7. Morales sent emails telling employees to be very careful with information about his location and his trips to the US, and that Senain, Ecuador's secret service, was investigating them. In an email reported by El País, Morales explained that Assange's associates were being surveilled because UC Global had "been informed of suspicions that the guest [this is how Assange was alluded to] is working for the Russian intelligence services." Morales ordered his employees to surveil any Americans or Russians who visited Assange.

In a November 2019 article, Stefania Maurizi said she had access to some of the videos, audios and photos showing microphones had been placed in the women's toilets to capture meetings between Assange and his lawyers and phones belonging to some of the embassy's visitors were compromised. Assange's Spanish lawyer Aitor Martinez said videos were taken of meetings between Assange and his legal defence team. Maurizi wrote that she believed the surveillance was conducted on behalf of the US government and could be used in support of the extradition case.

=== Spanish investigations ===
On June 20, 2019, El Pais revealed the existence of surveillance recordings and reports about Assange by UC Global. On 7 August 2019, Spain's High Court, the Audencia Nacional, opened proceedings against the head of UC Global, inquiring about the surveillance of Assange after he filed a complaint that accused UC Global of violating his privacy and client-attorney privileges as well as committing misappropriation, bribery and money laundering.

According to testimony in 2020, Assange's visitors were unknowingly surveilled and had their devices copied when they came to the embassy. In January, three employees testified that Morales ordered the surveillance of Assange, and that all of his visitors have their passports photographed, their cellphones and iPads disassembled and the contents downloaded and reports written about their meetings. According to the witnesses, the material on Assange was handed over to the CIA by a member of the security service of Sheldon Adelson, the owner of the Las Vegas Sands. In July 2020, Baltasar Garzón, former Ecuadorean consul Fidel Narváez and Stella Morris testified before the Spanish court. After testifying, Garzón said the court showed him a video of him talking to Assange inside the embassy. According to court papers seen by the Associated Press, it was alleged that Morales had passed the recordings to Zohar Lahav, described by Assange's lawyers as a security officer at Las Vegas Sands.

Morales was arrested on September 17 on charges involving violations of privacy and client-attorney privileges, as well as misappropriation, bribery, money laundering and criminal possession of weapons. He was released on bail. According to his lawyer, Assange testified that he was unaware that cameras installed by UC Global were also capturing audio and suggested the surveillance targeted his legal team.

In September 2020, Spanish courts took testimony from former UC Global employees, who said UC Global collected Assange's fingerprints and had a plot to obtain the nappy of one of his children. The witnesses said that UC Global got a contract with the Las Vegas Sands, which allegedly led Morales to say they were "playing in the big league" and had switched to "the dark side." According to the testimony, surveillance against Assange increased after Trump's election, and microphones were added to the cameras in December 2017. The witness who was asked to install the cameras refused, saying it was illegal.

==== International requests ====
On 25 September, Spanish Judge José de la Mata sent British authorities a European Investigation Order (EIO) asking for permission to question Assange by videoconference as a witness in the case against Morales. The United Kingdom Central Authority (UKCA), which is in charge of processing and responding to EIOs in the UK, provisionally denied De la Mata's request to question Assange, raised a number of objections to the request, and asked for more details. De la Mata responded to UKCA's objections on 14 October by stating that Assange was the victim who had filed the complaint and that unlawful disclosure of secrets and bribery are also crimes in the UK. He said that the crimes were partially committed on Spanish territory because the microphones used to spy on Assange were bought in Spain, and the information obtained was sent and uploaded to servers at UC Global S. L.'s headquarters in Spain. Spanish judicial bodies were upset at having their EIO request denied by UKCA and believed the British justice system was concerned by the effect the Spanish case may have on the process to extradite Assange to the US.

Britain agreed to allow Judge De la Mata to interview Assange via video link on 20 December.

In November 2021, Spanish judges accused the Department of Justice of stonewalling their investigation into UC Global and the CIA over surveillance of Assange. In June 2022, Pompeo was summoned by a Spanish court to explain an alleged kidnapping and assassination plot against Assange.

In November 2022, Judge Santiago Pedraz of Spain's National High Court filed a judicial assistance request with the US House Intelligence Committee asking for information related to UC Global, surveillance of Assange and CIA's possible involvement. Pedraz's legal request for information describes the alleged espionage in detail and names several potential victims, including former US congressman Dana Rohrabacher and former-president of Ecuador Rafael Correa. In October 2021, Adam Schiff Chairman of the House Intelligence Committee had instructed intelligence agencies to inform him of espionage activity related to Assange while he was in the embassy.

== See also ==
- Church Committee
- COINTELPRO
- Royal Commission on Intelligence and Security
- Surveillance abuse
- Surveillance of Julian Assange
