= Surveillance of Julian Assange =

After Julian Assange was granted asylum and entered the Ecuadorian embassy in London, new CCTV cameras were installed and security personnel working for UC Global and Promsecurity recorded his daily activities and interactions with staff and visitors, including his legal team. In a 2017 email, the surveillance was explained with suspicions that Assange was "working for the Russian intelligence services." New cameras with microphones were installed in December 2017, and the installation of microphones in fire extinguishers and the women's bathroom was ordered. Other microphones were installed in decorations in the embassy. David Morales, director of UC Global, arranged for the United States to have immediate access to the recordings. According to emails retrieved in 2019, Morales was also a collaborator of National Intelligence Centre (Spain). The embassy staff had removed the toilet in the women's bathroom in June 2012 at Assange's request so he could sleep in the quiet room, which he also used to meet with his lawyers.

Then Ecuadorian ambassador to the UK, Juan Falconí Puig, was unaware of the operation until a bill went to the embassy in May 2015 and then Ecuadorian foreign minister Ricardo Patiño had to explain the situation to the ambassador. According to David Morales, the surveillance was also ordered by the former Ecuadorian ambassador in London, Carlos Abad.

In April 2019, El País quoted Morales as saying that "The situation Assange is in is not easy because of his emotional state. Throughout the length of his stay, he has gone through different stages in which he was more or less in agreement with the [security and surveillance] procedures, but that is an area that does not correspond to him, but rather the client." On 20 June 2019, El País revealed the existence of surveillance recordings and reports about Assange by UC Global. On 7 August 2019, Spain's High Court opened proceedings inquiring about the surveillance of Assange after he filed a complaint that accused UC Global of violating his privacy and client-attorney privileges as well as committing misappropriation, bribery and money laundering.

According to testimony by former employees, the material on Assange was handed over to the CIA by a member of the security service of Sheldon Adelson, the owner of the Las Vegas Sands. According to court papers seen by the Associated Press, it was alleged that Morales had passed the recordings to Zohar Lahav, described by Assange's lawyers as a security officer at Las Vegas Sands. In 2022, four associates of Assange filed a lawsuit against the CIA alleging their civil rights were violated when they were recorded as part of the surveillance of Assange.

== Timeline of surveillance ==
In 2010, the NSA added Assange to its Manhunting Timeline.

In 2011, the NSA discussed categorising WikiLeaks as a "malicious foreign actor" for surveillance purposes.

Over five years Ecuador spent at least $5 million (£3.7m) to protect and surveil Assange, employing a security company and undercover agents to monitor him, his visitors, embassy staff and the British police as part of Operation Guest and Operation Hotel. New CCTV cameras were installed in the embassy soon after Assange moved in, and security personnel recorded his activities and interactions with staff, his legal team and other visitors in minute detail. Assange was questioned about visitors, who were required to leave their passports with security, which was used to create profiles of the visitors with details of the visit. Then Ecuadorian ambassador to the UK, Juan Falconí Puig, was unaware of the operation until a bill went to the embassy in May 2015 and then Ecuadorian foreign minister Ricardo Patiño had to explain the situation to the ambassador. According to David Morales, the surveillance was also ordered by the former Ecuadorian ambassador in London, Carlos Abad.

In 2015, Cynthia Viteri and Fernando Villavicencio sent secret documents to WikiLeaks showing that Ecuador was using an Italian company to run a surveillance program that was spying on journalists and political enemies, in addition to spying on Assange in the embassy. The New York Times reported that leaked chat logs from 2015 show that Assange and his inner circle were aware of the documents, which were not published by WikiLeaks.

In a 2017 email reported by El País, Morales wrote that Assange's associates were being surveilled because UC Global had "been informed of suspicions that the guest [this is how Assange was alluded to] is working for the Russian intelligence services." Morales ordered his employees to monitor any Americans or Russians who visited Assange. New cameras with microphones were installed in December 2017, and Morales ordered the installation of microphones in fire extinguishers and the women's bathroom. Other microphones were installed in decorations in the embassy. Recordings were made of Assange's meetings with his lawyers. Morales arranged for the United States to have immediate access to the recordings. The embassy staff had removed the toilet in the women's bathroom in June 2012 at Assange's request so he could sleep in the quiet room, which he also used to meet with his lawyers.

== Extortion attempt ==
On 10 April 2019, WikiLeaks said it had uncovered an extensive surveillance operation against Assange from within the embassy. WikiLeaks said that "material including video, audio, copies of private legal documents and a medical report" had surfaced in Spain and that unnamed individuals in Madrid had made an extortion attempt and threatened to make the information public unless they were paid €3 million. In May, Spanish police arrested José Martín Santos, a reporter with a past record of fraud, in connection with the extortion attempt. Martín Santos had met with Kristinn Hrafnsson in April and shown him over 100 files containing private correspondence, audio and video recordings from the embassy.

== Reporting ==
In 2014, The Intercept reported that in 2010, the NSA added Assange to its Manhunting Timeline and in 2011, the NSA discussed categorising WikiLeaks as a "malicious foreign actor" for surveillance purposes.

The Guardian reported that in 2014, the company hired to monitor Assange warned Ecuador's government that he was "intercepting and gathering information from the embassy and the people who worked there" and that he had compromised the embassy's communications system. WikiLeaks described the allegation as "an anonymous libel aligned with the current UK-US government onslaught against Mr Assange".

On 26 September 2019, the Spanish newspaper El País reported that the Spanish defence and security company Undercover Global S.L. had spied on Assange for the CIA during his time in the embassy. UC Global had been contracted to protect the embassy during this time. According to the report UC Global's owner David Morales had provided the CIA with audio and video of meetings Assange held with his lawyers and colleagues. Morales also arranged for the US to have direct access to the stream from video cameras installed in the embassy at the beginning of December 2017. The evidence was part of a secret investigation by Spain's High Court, the Audiencia Nacional, into Morales and his relationship with US intelligence. The investigation was precipitated by a complaint by Assange that accused UC Global of violating his privacy and client-attorney privileges as well as committing misappropriation, bribery and money laundering.

In a November 2019 article, Stefania Maurizi said she had access to some of the videos, audios and photos showing a medical examination of Assange, a meeting between Ecuadorian ambassador Carlos Abad Ortiz and his staff, a meeting between Assange, Glenn Greenwald and David Miranda and lunch between Assange and British rapper M.I.A. According to Maurizi, microphones had been placed in the women's toilets to capture meetings between Assange and his lawyers and phones belonging to some of the embassy's visitors were compromised. Spanish lawyer Aitor Martinez, who is part of Assange's legal team, said videos were taken of meetings between Assange and his legal defence team. Maurizi wrote that, based on statements from former employees of UC Global, internal UC Global emails and the type of information collected, she believed the surveillance was conducted on behalf of the US government and could be used in support of the extradition case.

== Spanish investigations ==
On 20 June 2019, El País revealed the existence of surveillance recordings and reports about Assange by UC Global. On 7 August 2019, Spain's High Court, the Audencia Nacional, opened proceedings against the head of UC Global, inquiring about the surveillance of Assange after he filed a complaint that accused UC Global of violating his privacy and client-attorney privileges as well as committing misappropriation, bribery and money laundering.

According to testimony in 2020, Assange's visitors were unknowingly surveilled and had their devices copied when they came to the embassy. In January, three employees testified that Morales ordered the surveillance of Assange, and that all of his visitors have their passports photographed, their cellphones and iPads disassembled and the contents downloaded and reports written about their meetings. According to the witnesses, the material on Assange was handed over to the CIA by a member of the security service of Sheldon Adelson, the owner of the Las Vegas Sands. In July 2020, Baltasar Garzón, former Ecuadorean consul Fidel Narváez and Stella Morris testified before the Spanish court. After testifying, Garzón said the court showed him a video of him talking to Assange inside the embassy. According to court papers seen by the Associated Press, it was alleged that Morales had passed the recordings to Zohar Lahav, described by Assange's lawyers as a security officer at Las Vegas Sands.

Morales was arrested on 17 September 2019 on charges involving violations of privacy and client-attorney privileges, as well as misappropriation, bribery, money laundering and criminal possession of weapons. He was released on bail. According to his lawyer, Assange testified that he was unaware that cameras installed by UC Global were also capturing audio and suggested the surveillance likely targeted his legal team. Some observers questioned the testimony's impact on attempts to prosecute Assange.

In September 2020, Spanish courts took testimony from former UC Global employees, who said UC Global collected Assange's fingerprints and had a plot to obtain the nappy of one of his children. The witnesses said that UC Global got a contract with the Las Vegas Sands, which allegedly led Morales to say they were "playing in the big league" and had switched to "the dark side." According to the testimony, surveillance against Assange increased after Trump's election, and microphones were added to the cameras in December 2017. The witness who was asked to install the cameras refused, saying it was illegal. According to the witness, Morales' American contacts also suggested extreme measures. "There was a suggestion that the door of the embassy would be left open allowing people to enter from the outside and kidnap or poison Assange."

=== International requests ===
On 25 September 2019, Spanish Judge José de la Mata sent British authorities a European Investigation Order (EIO) asking for permission to question Assange by videoconference as a witness in the case against Morales. The United Kingdom Central Authority (UKCA), which is in charge of processing and responding to EIOs in the UK, provisionally denied De la Mata's request to question Assange, raised a number of objections to the request, and asked for more details. De la Mata responded to UKCA's objections on 14 October by stating that Assange was the victim who had filed the complaint and that unlawful disclosure of secrets and bribery are also crimes in the UK. He said that the crimes were partially committed on Spanish territory because the microphones used to spy on Assange were bought in Spain, and the information obtained was sent and uploaded to servers at UC Global S. L.'s headquarters in Spain. Spanish judicial bodies were upset at having their EIO request denied by UKCA and believed the British justice system was concerned by the effect the Spanish case may have on the process to extradite Assange to the US.

Britain agreed to allow Judge De la Mata to interview Assange via video link on 20 December.

In November 2021, Spanish judges accused the Department of Justice of stonewalling their investigation into UC Global and the CIA over surveillance of Assange.

In June 2022, Pompeo was summoned by a Spanish court to explain an alleged kidnapping and assassination plot against Assange.

In November 2022, Judge Santiago Pedraz of Spain's National High Court filed a judicial assistance request with the US House Intelligence Committee asking for information related to UC Global, surveillance of Assange and CIA's possible involvement. Pedraz's legal request for information describes the alleged espionage in detail and names several potential victims, including former US congressman Dana Rohrabacher and former-president of Ecuador Rafael Correa. In October 2021, Adam Schiff Chairman of the House Intelligence Committee had instructed intelligence agencies to inform him of espionage activity related to Assange while he was in the embassy.

== Allegations of CIA involvement ==
After Assange was expelled from the embassy, foreign minister José Valencia said that Assange "permanently accused [embassy] staff of spying on and filming him" for the United States.

In August 2022, a group of American lawyers and journalists associated with WikiLeaks founder Julian Assange filed a lawsuit against the Central Intelligence Agency, former CIA Director Mike Pompeo, Undercover Global S.L., and its head David Morales, alleging that the CIA violated their Constitutional rights by recording their conversations with Assange and copying their phones and computers. El País published a quote from a message sent by David Morales to UC Global staff in which he said "We have been informed of suspicions that [Assange] is working for the Russian intelligence services, thus the profiling of his visitors and aides". A request by the CIA to have the lawsuit dismissed was rejected by U.S. District Court Judge John Koeltl in December 2023. Koeltl ruled that, if the CIA accessed the contents of the plaintiffs' phones, then it had breached their privacy rights under the U.S. Constitution. Koeltl dismissed portions of the lawsuit, including allegations that the CIA violated the plaintiffs' rights by surveilling their conversations at the embassy and by copying their passports.

According to the lawsuits allegations, the CIA recruited UC Global in 2017 through officials from the Las Vegas Sands casino group, which was controlled by Sheldon Adelson who the suit alleges "had cooperated with the CIA on similar matters in the past." UC Global provided security for the embassy and required guests to sign in and leave electronic devices with guards before visiting Assange. The information was allegedly then copied and sent to the CIA, with Pompeo's knowledge and approval. UC Global also sent recordings from security cameras and microphones secretly placed around the embassy to the CIA. Previous filings by Assange's lawyers in Spanish courts had also named Zohar Lahav and Brian Nagel of Las Vegas Sands and alleged that the surveillance continued under Promsecurity after UC Global's contract ended.

Morales has denied working for the CIA and said that the surveillance was done at the request of Ecuador's government. At a press conference in New York, the lawyers said that Ecuador was unaware of the surveillance. The lawyers allege that the surveillance violated the rights of more than 100 US citizens.

In June 2023, Assange's lawyers discovered further documents on Morales' hard drive which they said were not included in the files originally provided by the police. The new material included a folder labelled "CIA", which contained videos of Assange's visitors taken by the hidden cameras and microphones that UC Global installed in the Ecuadorian Embassy.
