= Assange v Swedish Prosecution Authority =

Legal proceedings over extraditing Julian Assange to Sweden

Assange v The Swedish Prosecution Authority
- Court: Supreme Court of the United Kingdom
- Argued: 1–2 February 2012
- Decided: 30 May 2012
- Neutral citation: [2012] UKSC 22

Case history
- Prior history: [2011] EWHC 2849 (Admin), [2011] EWCA Civ 2849

Holding
- A European Arrest Warrant issued by a public prosecutor is a valid Part 1 warrant issued by a judicial authority within the meaning of section 2(2) and 66 of the Extradition Act 2003.

Case opinions
- Majority: Lord Phillips, joined by Lord Brown, Lord Dyson, Lord Kerr and Lord Walker
- Dissent: Lady Hale, Lord Mance

Area of law
- Extradition (European Arrest Warrant)

Assange v Swedish Prosecution Authority were the set of legal proceedings in the United Kingdom concerning the requested extradition of Julian Assange to Sweden for a "preliminary investigation" into accusations of sexual offences allegedly made in August 2010. Assange left Sweden for the UK in 27 September 2010 and a warrant for his arrest was issued in his absence the same day. He was suspected of rape of a lesser degree, unlawful coercion and multiple cases of sexual molestation. In June 2012, Assange breached bail and sought refuge at Ecuador's Embassy in London and was granted asylum.

On 12 August 2015, Swedish prosecutors announced that the statute of limitations had expired for three of the allegations against Assange while he was in the Ecuadorian embassy. The investigation into the rape allegation was also dropped by Swedish authorities on 19 May 2017 because of Assange's asylum in the Ecuadorian embassy. Assange said in these proceedings that he feared he would ultimately be extradited to the United States if he were sent to Sweden.

In May 2019, the Swedish Prosecution Authority reopened the investigation against Assange. The prosecutors expressed the intent to extradite Assange from the United Kingdom after he served his 50-week prison sentence for skipping bail. In June 2019, the Uppsala District Court denied a request to detain Assange, thereby preventing his extradition to Sweden.

As of 19 November 2019, the prosecution dropped the case because "the evidence has weakened considerably due to the long period of time that has elapsed" although they stated that they were confident in the complainant.

== Background and accusations ==
On 11 August 2010, Julian Assange flew to Stockholm. According to the police report filed in response to a complaint by Anna Ardin, she had arranged Assange's trip to Sweden and he stayed at her flat while she was out of town. She returned on 13 August and went out for a meal with Assange before returning to her flat with him. According to her account, which Assange disputes, he began pulling off her clothes. Ardin told police she didn't want to, "but that it was too late to stop Assange as she had gone along with it so far", and so she let him undress her. Ardin told police she realised he was trying to have unprotected sex with her, held her down and stopped her from reaching for a condom before agreeing to use it, but she said he had "done something" to it that made it rip, which he denied.

On 14 August, Assange spoke at a seminar organised by Ardin. "Miss W" met Assange at the seminar and had lunch with him, Ardin, the co-ordinator of the Swedish WikiLeaks group and a few others. Ardin had a party for Assange that evening and later said that "Julian is in many ways a fantastic person," but adding that "the Julian who took part in the [party] is totally different from the one who humiliated and abused me the previous evening." One of her friends, "Monica", later told police that during the party Ardin told her about the ripped condom and unprotected sex. Another friend told police that during the party Ardin described the sex she had with Assange: "Not only had it been the world's worst screw, it had also been violent." The next day, Ardin told Monica she thought Assange had ripped the condom on purpose.

On 16 August, Miss W phoned Assange and arranged to meet him and go back to her flat outside Stockholm. She told police they started to have sex, but he didn't want to wear a condom and lost interest when she didn't want to have unprotected sex. Later that night they had consensual sex and "he agreed unwillingly to use a condom". Early the next morning, she awoke to discover him having sex with her, and when asked he said he wasn't wearing a condom. She contacted Assange and asked him to take a test for STDs, and he refused on the grounds that he did not have time.

After being allegedly sexually assaulted by Assange, she wanted to contact him to take a test for sexually transmitted infections. She contacted Ardin, the lecture organiser, to get help reaching Assange. When they spoke to each other, they realised they had both had a similar experience and decided to go to the police together to ask for advice.

On 18 August 2010, Assange applied for a work and residence permit in Sweden. Ardin later told police that that morning he exposed himself to her and rubbed against her, an act which Swedish authorities characterised as Assange having "deliberately molested" her.

== Investigation and extradition process ==
=== Complaints and initial investigation ===
On 20 August 2010, Miss W and Anna Ardin, a 26-year-old living in Enköping and a 31-year-old living in Stockholm, reported to the Swedish police that Assange had engaged in unprotected sexual activity with them that violated the scope of their consent, and that one woman was asleep in one case. Before talking to the other woman and the police, Ardin did not consider all of Assange's actions to have been a crime. The police told them that they could not simply make Assange take an STD test, but that their statements would be passed to a prosecutor.

The next day, the case was transferred to Chefsåklagare (Chief Public Prosecutor) Eva Finné to lessen the burden on the duty prosecutors, which Swedish prosecutors do in serious crimes or high-profile matters. After learning of the investigation, Assange said, "The charges are without basis and their issue at this moment is deeply disturbing". The preliminary investigation concerning suspected rape was discontinued by Finné on 25 August and the investigation of the other allegations continued, but two days later Claes Borgström, the attorney representing the two women, requested a review of the prosecutor's decision to drop part of the investigation, a process common in Sweden. On 30 August, Assange was questioned by the Stockholm police regarding the alleged sexual molestation. He denied them, and said he had consensual sexual encounters with the two women.

=== Investigation reinstated ===
On 1 September 2010, Överåklagare (Director of Public Prosecution) Marianne Ny decided to resume the preliminary investigation concerning all of the original allegations. On 27 September 2010 Assange left Sweden for UK and prosecutors informed his Swedish lawyer Björn Hurtig that an arrest warrant would be issued for Assange. Hurtig admitted that prosecutors had tried to interview Assange before he left Sweden with their permission. Assange was arrested in his absence the same day. This was the first step in the criminal prosecution procedure in Sweden, and only after the questioning would the prosecution authority be able to formally indict him.

=== Arrest warrant ===
Assange told friends in London he was supposed to return to Stockholm for a police interview on 14 October, but that he had decided to stay away. On 18 October 2010, Assange's request for a Swedish residency permit was denied because his application failed to fulfill all the requirements. On 18 November 2010, Marianne Ny ordered the detention of Julian Assange on suspicion of rape, three cases of sexual molestation and unlawful coercion. The Stockholm District Court acceded to the order and issued a European Arrest Warrant to execute it. The warrant was appealed to the Svea Court of Appeal which upheld it, but changed the order to suspicion of rape of a lesser degree, unlawful coercion and two cases of sexual molestation rather than three. The warrant was also appealed to the Supreme Court of Sweden, which decided not to hear the case.

On 30 November 2010, Interpol posted a Red Notice and put Assange on its most-wanted list.

=== Detention and bail ===
Assange presented himself to and was arrested by officers from the Metropolitan Police Extradition Unit at Scotland Yard on 7 December 2010, and was remanded to London's Wandsworth Prison. When he was arrested, he refused to cooperate with the standard British procedure of collecting photographs, fingerprints and DNA samples from people who are arrested. On 16 December, he was granted bail with conditions of residence at Ellingham Hall, Norfolk, and wearing of an electronic tag. Bail was set at £240,000 surety with a deposit of £200,000 ($312,700).

On release on bail, Assange said "I hope to continue my work and continue to protest my innocence in this matter," and told the BBC, "This has been a very successful smear campaign and a very wrong one." He claimed that the Swedish extradition proceedings were "actually an attempt to get me into a jurisdiction which will then make it easier to extradite me to the US." Swedish prosecutors denied that the case had anything to do with WikiLeaks.

=== Extradition hearing ===
The extradition hearing took place on 7–8 and 11 February 2011 before the City of Westminster Magistrates' Court sitting at Belmarsh Magistrates' Court in London. Assange's lawyers at the extradition hearing were Geoffrey Robertson QC and Mark Stephens, human rights specialists, and the prosecution was represented by a team led by Clare Montgomery QC. Arguments were presented as to whether the Swedish prosecutor had the authority to issue a European Arrest Warrant, if the extradition was requested for prosecution or interrogation, if the alleged crimes qualified as extradition crimes, if there was an abuse of process, if his human rights would be respected, and he would receive a fair trial if extradited to Sweden.

On 24 February 2011 it was announced that the court upheld the extradition warrant. Senior District Judge Howard Riddle found against Assange on each of the main arguments against his extradition. The judge said "no evidence has been provided" the warrant was politically motivated and "as a matter of fact, and looking at all the circumstances in the round, this person (Mr Assange) passes the threshold of being an accused person and is wanted for prosecution." Judge Riddle concluded: "I am satisfied that the specified offences are extradition offences" and one of the allegations "would amount to rape" in the UK.

The judge was severely critical of Assange's Swedish lawyer, Björn Hurtig, for making untrue statements. Hurtig said it was a mistake, but Judge Riddle responded by saying "I do not accept that this was a genuine mistake. It cannot have slipped his mind. The statement was a deliberate attempt to mislead the court." Judge Riddle said the untruth in Hurtig's statement "fatally undermined" two other defence expert witnesses. Assange commented after the decision to extradite him, saying "It comes as no surprise but is nevertheless wrong. It comes as the result of a European arrest warrant system amok."

==== Appeal to the High Court ====
On 2 March 2011, Assange's lawyers lodged an appeal with the High Court challenging the decision to extradite him to Sweden. Assange remained on conditional bail. The appeal hearing took place on 12 and 13 July 2011 at the High Court in London. Assange had a new legal team that argued his actions might be seen as "disrespectful, discourteous, disturbing" but that it was not illegal. The judges' decision was reserved, and a written judgment was delivered on 2 November 2011, dismissing the appeal. Assange was also ordered to pay £19,000 in costs.

==== Appeal to the Supreme Court ====
On 5 December 2011, Assange was refused permission by the High Court to appeal to the Supreme Court but the High Court certified that his case raised a point of law of general public importance.

The Supreme Court heard the appeal on 1 and 2 February 2012. The court reserved its judgment, and dismissed the appeal by a 5–2 majority on 30 May 2012. The court granted Assange two weeks to make an application to reopen the appeal after his counsel argued the judgments of the majority relied on an interpretation of the Vienna Convention on the Law of Treaties that was not argued during the hearing. The application was rejected on 14 June, thereby exhausting Assange's legal options in the United Kingdom.

He remained on conditional bail in the United Kingdom.

=== Ecuador asylum and bail forfeiture ===
On 19 June 2012, Assange sought refuge at Ecuador's Embassy in London and was granted temporary protection. On 16 August 2012, he was granted full asylum by the Ecuadorian government due to fears of political persecution and extradition to the United States. Assange and his supporters said he was not concerned about any proceedings in Sweden as such, but believed that the Swedish allegations were designed to discredit him and were a pretext for his extradition from Sweden to the United States. Because Assange did not comply with his bail conditions, his supporters, including journalist Jemima Goldsmith, journalist John Pilger, and filmmaker Ken Loach, forfeited £200,000 in bail and £40,000 as promised sureties. Goldsmith said she was surprised at his asylum bid and she wanted and expected him to face the Swedish allegations but that he had "a real fear of being extradited to the US".

In 2012, Assange said he would go to Sweden if provided with a diplomatic guarantee that he would not be turned over to the United States, to which the Swedish foreign ministry stated that Sweden's legislation does not allow any judicial decision like extradition to be predetermined.

In August 2014, Assange announced that he would leave the embassy "soon", adding that he had "not been charged with an offence in the United Kingdom or in Sweden, and there has been no public indictments in relation to my work in the United States." Assange remained in the Ecuadorian embassy until 11 April 2019, when he was arrested for violating his 2012 bail conditions after the Metropolitan Police Service were invited in by the Ambassador of Ecuador to the United Kingdom.

=== Review of detention order ===
On 24 June 2014, The Guardian reported that Assange's lawyers filed a request to Stockholm District Court to release controversial telephone evidence, based on an update to Sweden's code of judicial procedure (1 June 2014) to conform with EU law including a new provision that those arrested or detained have the right to be made aware of "facts forming the basis for the decision to arrest". The court rejected the request.

On 16 July 2014, the Stockholm District Court reviewed the detention order at Assange's request. During the proceedings, Assange's defence lawyers said that the prosecutors have a duty to advance the case, and that they had shown passivity in refusing to go to London to interview Assange. After hearing evidence, the district court concluded that there was probable cause to suspect Assange of committing the alleged crimes, and that the detention order should remain in place to ensure that the legal proceedings will be concluded. Ecuador immediately issued a statement: "The Ecuadorian Government reaffirms its offer of judicial cooperation to the Kingdom of Sweden, to reach a prompt solution to the case. In this sense Ecuador keeps its invitation to judicial officers visit the London Embassy so that Julian Assange can be interviewed or via videoconference. Both possibilities are explicitly referred in the current procedural legislation in Sweden and the European Union."

On 20 November 2014, the Swedish Court of Appeal refused Assange's appeal and upheld the 2010 detention order since Assange was "suspected of crimes of a relatively serious nature and there is a great risk that he will evade legal proceedings or punishment". The court issued a statement saying the detention order hadn't been enforced because Assange was in the embassy and criticising the prosecution for not having done more to advance the case by examining alternative avenues.

=== Assange interviewed in London ===
In 2011, a CPS lawyer wrote in an email to Marianne Ny that "it would not be prudent for the Swedish authorities to try to interview the defendant in the UK... He would of course have no obligation under English law to answer any questions put to him.... any attempt to interview under strict Swedish law would invariably be fraught with problems.... I suggest you interview him only on his surrender to Sweden and in accordance with the Swedish law."

Assange's lawyers offered to let the Swedish prosecutor question him at the embassy or by video link, but the offer wasn't accepted at the time. In March 2015, faced with the prospect of the Swedish statute of limitations expiring for some of the allegations, the prosecutor offered to question Assange in the Ecuadorean embassy, and indicated that the interview would be conducted by a deputy prosecutor, Ingrid Isgren, as well as a police investigator. The UK agreed to the interview in May awaiting Ecuadorean approval. In August 2015, the statute of limitations on three allegations ended. In December 2015, Ecuador stated that it had reached a deal with Sweden which would allow him to be interviewed in the embassy. In January 2016, Ecuador rejected Sweden's request to interview Assange in London, and told the Swedish prosecutor they would have to submit a new request to interview Assange, and that Ecuador would conduct the actual interview.

In September 2016, Ecuador set a date for Assange's interview over the rape allegation. The date was 17 October 2016. It was established that the interview would be conducted by an Ecuadorian prosecutor, with Isgren and a police officer present. The interview was subsequently postponed until 14 November 2016, "to ensure the presence of Mr Assange's attorneys," according to a spokesman for Assange's legal team. According to Assange's lawyer, the "shape" of the questions was still being discussed a week before the scheduled interview. Under the agreement worked out with Ecuador, the Swedes were not allowed to question Julian Assange directly or ask follow-up questions. Since the Swedish prosecutor had not interviewed Assange by 18 August 2015, the questioning pertained only to the open investigation of "lesser degree rape". Questions were submitted in Spanish and asked by an Ecuadorean prosecutor. According to the BBC, this may explain the Swedish prosecutor's reluctance to question Assange in London, insisting it would "lower the quality of the interview".

Assange released his testimony to the public on 7 December.

==== Statute of limitations expires for three allegations ====
On 12 August 2015, Swedish prosecutors announced that, as the statute of limitations for the less serious allegations had run out, and they had not succeeded in interviewing Assange, they would end part of their preliminary investigation. After 18 August 2015, Assange could no longer be charged for any of the three less serious potential charges. However, the preliminary investigation into the more serious allegation remained open as the statute of limitations for the potential charge was not expected to expire until 2020.

=== United Nations finding ===
On 5 February 2016, the Office of the United Nations High Commissioner for Human Rights announced that the Working Group on Arbitrary Detention had found that the UK and Swedish governments were holding Assange in arbitrary detention by initially keeping him in isolation at Wandsworth prison and because the Swedish prosecutor was conducting its investigation with a "lack of diligence". The Working Group said Assange should be allowed to walk free and be given compensation. The UK and Swedish governments denied the charge of detaining Assange arbitrarily. One of the five members of the Working Group disagreed with the finding and thought it was outside the Working Group's mandate, adding that "fugitives are often self-confined within the places where they evade arrest and detention".

The UK Foreign Secretary, Philip Hammond, said the charge was "ridiculous" and that the group was "made up of lay people", and called Assange a "fugitive from justice" who "can come out any time he chooses", and called the panel's ruling "flawed in law". Swedish prosecutors called the group's charge irrelevant. The UK Foreign Office said "an allegation of rape is still outstanding and a European Arrest Warrant in place, so the U.K. continues to have a legal obligation to extradite Mr. Assange to Sweden" should he leave the embassy. On 1 March 2016, 500 prominent Assange supporters, including Nobel prize winners, politicians and human rights organisations, signed an open letter accusing the UK and Sweden of undermining the UN.

Mark Ellis, executive director of the International Bar Association, stated that the finding is "not binding on British law". US legal scholar Noah Feldman described the Working Group's conclusion as astonishing, summarising it as "Assange might be charged with a crime in the US. Ecuador thinks charging him with violating national security law would amount to 'political persecution' or worse. Therefore, Sweden must give up on its claims to try him for rape, and Britain must ignore the Swedes' arrest warrant and let him leave the country."

Immediately following the opinion's publication, Assange's lawyers asked the Stockholm District Court to lift the European arrest warrant. On 14 April, the Swedish prosecution authorities responded saying the warrant should be upheld. The Svea Court of Appeal decided to uphold the warrant on 16 September. After being asked by the British to review the case, the Working Group on Arbitrary Detention formally declined to do so in late November, saying that there was not enough new information provided to warrant such a review.

=== Revocation of arrest warrant ===
On 3 May 2017, one of Assange's lawyers, Per Samuelson, asked Swedish courts to dismiss the detention order, saying "With the Supreme Court's own reasoning, his detention should now be rescinded because we can now prove that the U.S. is hunting Julian Assange." This followed public statements made by CIA Director Mike Pompeo that Wikileaks was a "hostile intelligence service" and Attorney General Jeff Sessions that the U.S. was stepping up its efforts against leaks of sensitive information when asked about Assange.

On 19 May 2017, the Swedish chief prosecutor applied to the Stockholm District Court to rescind the arrest warrant for Julian Assange because it was impossible to serve notice while he was in the embassy and that they "cannot expect to receive assistance from Ecuador", effectively discontinuing their investigation against Julian Assange. The prosecutor said the case could be reinstated until the expiration of the statute of limitations in 2020 if Assange 'made himself available'. Additionally, Britain's arrest warrant pertaining to bail violations remained open. Swedish Justice Minister Morgan Johansson blamed Assange for the lack of progress in the case and said he "did not want to come to Sweden to explain and to be interrogated".

=== European Investigation Order ===
In April 2019, Assange's political asylum was withdrawn and the Metropolitan police arrested him and a US indictment was unsealed. In May 2019, the investigation was reopened at the victim's request. Swedish Deputy Director of Public Prosecutions Eva-Marie Persson applied to have Assange detained as a prelude to the issue of a European arrest warrant and extradition to Sweden. The Uppsala District Court denied the request, stating that the investigation did not require Assange's presence in Sweden. Persson said she intended to issue a European Investigation Order to interview Assange instead.

=== Investigation closed ===
The prosecution announced that the investigation had been closed as of 19 November 2019 because "the evidence has weakened considerably due to the long period of time that has elapsed". It said the complainant had "submitted a credible and reliable version of events".

=== Role of the UK Crown Prosecution Service ===
The release of correspondence between Swedish prosecutors and the United Kingdom's CPS has provided an insight into the role the CPS played in the Swedish investigation.

In 2011, the CPS advised Swedish prosecutor Marianne Ny about what it considered to be the issues with interviewing Assange in Britain, concluding "I suggest you interview [Assange] only on his surrender to Sweden and in accordance with Swedish law". The CPS told Ny, "It is simply amazing how much work this is generating. It sometimes seems like an industry. Do not think that the case is being dealt with as just another extradition request." Assange's legal team stated that, following these revelations, they would probably challenge the extradition request in court again.

In August 2012, a CPS lawyer handling the case sent an email to the Swedish prosecutors about a news article which suggested that Sweden could drop the case against Assange, writing: "Don't you dare get cold feet!!!". Marianne Ny replied "no cold feet (yet)" and another email from the Swedish prosecutors said "it is not very likely we would get cold feet, as the weather is still rather warm and all Swedes have warm winter boots!". The prosecutor added that their webpage was "perhaps not as satisfying/revealing as the journalists would want, but that is what we can provide at the moment". In 2013, prosecutor Marianne Ny wrote to the CPS and said that she was obliged to consider to lift the detention order and withdraw the European arrest warrant if the actions were not proportionate to the time passing, the costs and seriousness of the crime. Ny wrote "I am sorry this came as a [bad] surprise... I hope I didn’t ruin your weekend". The CPS responded to Ny that it did not consider costs a relevant factor in the case.

The CPS deleted emails communications that were sent between it and the Swedish prosecutors three months after a CPS lawyer retired in 2014.

Assange's supporters have accused the CPS of being inconsistent in its description of the status of the case. The CPS declared the case as live in April 2013 when dismissing a personal data request by Assange and said the case was closed in 2014 when justifying its deletion of emails about the case. Stefania Maurizi, the journalist who sought the correspondence under Freedom of Information legislation, stated in 2023 that the CPS has never produced a written policy justifying the destruction of the documents. The Swedish prosecution service also deleted a substantial proportion of its correspondence with the CPS. The CPS estimated that it exchanged between 7,200 and 9,600 pages of correspondence with the Swedish Prosecution Authority between 2010 and 2015.

== Response ==
In 2019, supporters of Assange said the prosecutors decision to drop their rape investigation was a vindication, while others said it vindicated his legal tactic to outwait them.

=== Melzer's investigation ===
UN Special Rapporteur on Torture, Nils Melzer investigated the rape accusations against Assange and said he had never before seen a comparable case where a person was subjected to nine years of a preliminary investigation for rape without charges being filed. He said Assange's lawyers made over 30 offers to arrange for Assange to visit Sweden in exchange for a guarantee that he would not be extradited to the U.S. over unknown charges, and described such diplomatic assurances as routine international practice. Melzer criticised Swedish prosecutors for, among other things, allegedly changing one of the women's statements without her involvement, to make it sound like a possible rape. Melzer described the Swedish rape investigation as "abuse of judicial processes aimed at pushing a person into a position where he is unable to defend himself".

==== Criticism of Melzer's response ====
More than 300 human rights lawyers and law professors from numerous countries sharply criticised Melzer in response. In an open letter, they said that on the issue of sexual violence, Melzer's intervention was "both legally erroneous and harmful to the development and protection of human rights law." Melzer said he stood by his statement that the evidence collected in Sweden was not a basis for investigating the suspected rape.

One of the women interviewed by Melzer later criticised him and demanded his resignation. She said that by defining how a "proper rape-victim" should act, Melzer was engaging in victim blaming and that his report was partially untrue and defamatory.

=== Conspiracy theories ===
Assange suggested that the Swedish allegations were trumped up in retaliation for his WikiLeaks work and part of a Pentagon programme of "dirty tricks to ruin us". Assange said the goal of the plot was to extradite him to the United States. Foreign Policy and the Sydney Morning Herald called it a conspiracy theory. Australian Foreign Minister Bob Carr said Assange would be safer in Sweden than the UK and the suggestion that "the Swedes are after him as a CIA conspiracy to get him to Stockholm and allowing him to be bundled off to Langley, Virginia is sheer fantasy". According to the Sydney Morning Herald, people with knowledge of the case also discounted a conspiracy to discredit WikiLeaks. In 2011, a judge said that "no evidence has been provided" of political motivation for the arrest warrant. The leader of the WikiLeaks group in Stockholm, who was a colleague of Assange's and friend of the complainants, said it was a normal police investigation and that "the enemies of WikiLeaks may try to use this, but it begins with the two women and Julian. It is not the CIA sending a woman in a short skirt."

Assange supporters said the conspiracy hinged on the coincidence that Assange was accused in a sex case and challenging the United States government at the same time. They also believe that there was political interference in the early case, but a New York Times analysis found the case was less flawed than Assange supporters claimed and investigative journalists found no evidence of CIA or Swedish government conspiracies. Kate Harding, wrote in Salon that "[y]ou don't have to be a conspiracy theorist to find the timing of Interpol's warrant for the arrest of WikiLeaks founder Julian Assange ... curious." She wrote that nothing was yet known and there was no public evidence connecting the allegations to Wikileaks publications.

==== Harassment of complainants, lawyers and journalists ====
Theories spread that Anna Ardin and Miss W were part of a conspiracy against Assange and WikiLeaks in what Salon called "the rush to smear Assange's rape accuser." Assange's supporters made several suggestions that Ardin and Miss W were connected to the CIA or wanted revenge. Websites devoted to slut-shaming the complainants were created. Assange fed criticism of his accusers, and according to Ardin, he was active in backing the theories that she was a CIA agent. Because of the rumors, Ardin was harassed and threatened, and chose to live in Barcelona under a different name. Kate Harding, wrote in Salon that, as far as she could tell, the only source for the CIA claim was a CounterPunch article by Israel Shamir and Paul Bennett "that reads like a screenplay treatment by a college freshman who's terrified of women." Alex Gibney wrote that Shamir's son Johannes Wahlström "helped to engineer a vilification campaign against the two women who accused Mr. Assange of sexual assaults."

In December 2010, the website for the law firm representing Assange's accusers was hacked and shut down. In August 2012, Craig Murray, a friend and supporter of Julian Assange, named one of the women who had made allegations against Assange while live on BBC's Newsnight and encouraged viewers to research her. The host condemned it and BBC removed the episode from the iPlayer. Fellow guest Joan Smith said left-leaning men were "queuing up to cast aspersions on these women" because of sympathies to Assange's politics.

Leaked messages with a private group of about 10 supporters were published by The Intercept in 2018. The messages revealed that in 2015, WikiLeaks discussed how to discredit lawyers and journalists who were unfavourable to Assange. In response to the leaked messages, lawyer Elisabeth Fritz, who represented one of the women who has accused Assange of sexual assault, said "WikiLeaks and Assange have, and continue to, deliberately spread false information in an attempt to turn public opinion against the women accusing Assange of sexual offences, cast doubt on the accusations, and to discredit myself and the Swedish legal system."

=== Statements by Assange ===
Assange said that just after he got to Sweden, someone "in a Western intelligence agency" told him about an alleged U.S. plot to embroil him in immoral conduct. Assange said that Frank Rieger, a member of the Chaos Computer Club, wrote a press release about it because "it did no good to put these things out after some damage had been done" but Assange didn't publish it in time. Rieger denied it. Assange told journalist Raffi Khatchadourian that Sweden had a "very, very poor judicial system" that he said was driven by a "crazed radical feminist ideology". He also said that the case was a matter of international politics, and referred to Sweden as a "US satrapy". Assange told other journalists that one of the plaintiffs was a “notorious radical feminist” and that the women were "bamboozled" by police and in a "tizzy". Allies of Assange widely circulated alleged quotes attributed to Assange's accusers that they "did not want to accuse JA" and "it was the police who fabricated the charges." The only source for the quotes was Assange, who said in the footnotes of an affidavit that they were from an email his lawyers wrote paraphrasing an unidentified citation. Assange's lawyer, Björn Hurtig, said he wasn't allowed to make notes about the text messages when he reviewed them.

=== Statements by Assange's lawyers ===
Mark Stevens, Assange's British lawyer said "the honeytrap has been sprung. Dark forces are at work", which Assange later conceded was "not probable" and that there was no evidence of a honeytrap. The New York Times said there was no public evidence to suggest that the allegations (which it termed "charges") were retaliation for his WikiLeaks work. The New Statesman criticised Assange's English lawyer for calling the allegations against Assange "sex by surprise" and telling the media that it wasn't a crime in the UK. Salon criticised several pieces of heavily cited reporting on the topic that relied on a "Daily Mail piece, a Swedish tabloid, and statements from Assange's lawyers." According to New Statesman, a British judge had already ruled that it would be considered rape in the UK.

The New Statesman criticised Assange's English lawyer for incorrectly telling the media that the prosecutor never asked to interview Assange. The judge was severely critical of Assange's Swedish lawyer, Björn Hurtig, for making similar untrue statements in the February 2011 extradition hearing and accused Hurtig of deliberately attempting to mislead the court. Hurtig said it was a mistake, but Judge Riddle responded by saying "I do not accept that this was a genuine mistake. It cannot have slipped his mind. The statement was a deliberate attempt to mislead the court." Judge Riddle said the untruth in Hurtig's statement "fatally undermined" two other defence expert witnesses he had briefed. The Swedish Bar Association opened an investigation into Hurtig and his behavior in the case after Bar Association secretary general Anne Ramberg noticed the judge's "extremely serious critique" of Hurtig. After the investigation, the Swedish Bar Association's disciplinary board issued a warning to Hurtig.

== See also ==
- Indictment and arrest of Julian Assange
- 2012-2013 Ecuador–United Kingdom diplomatic crisis
