= 2012–2013 Ecuador–United Kingdom diplomatic crisis =

- Part of the prosecution of Julian Assange
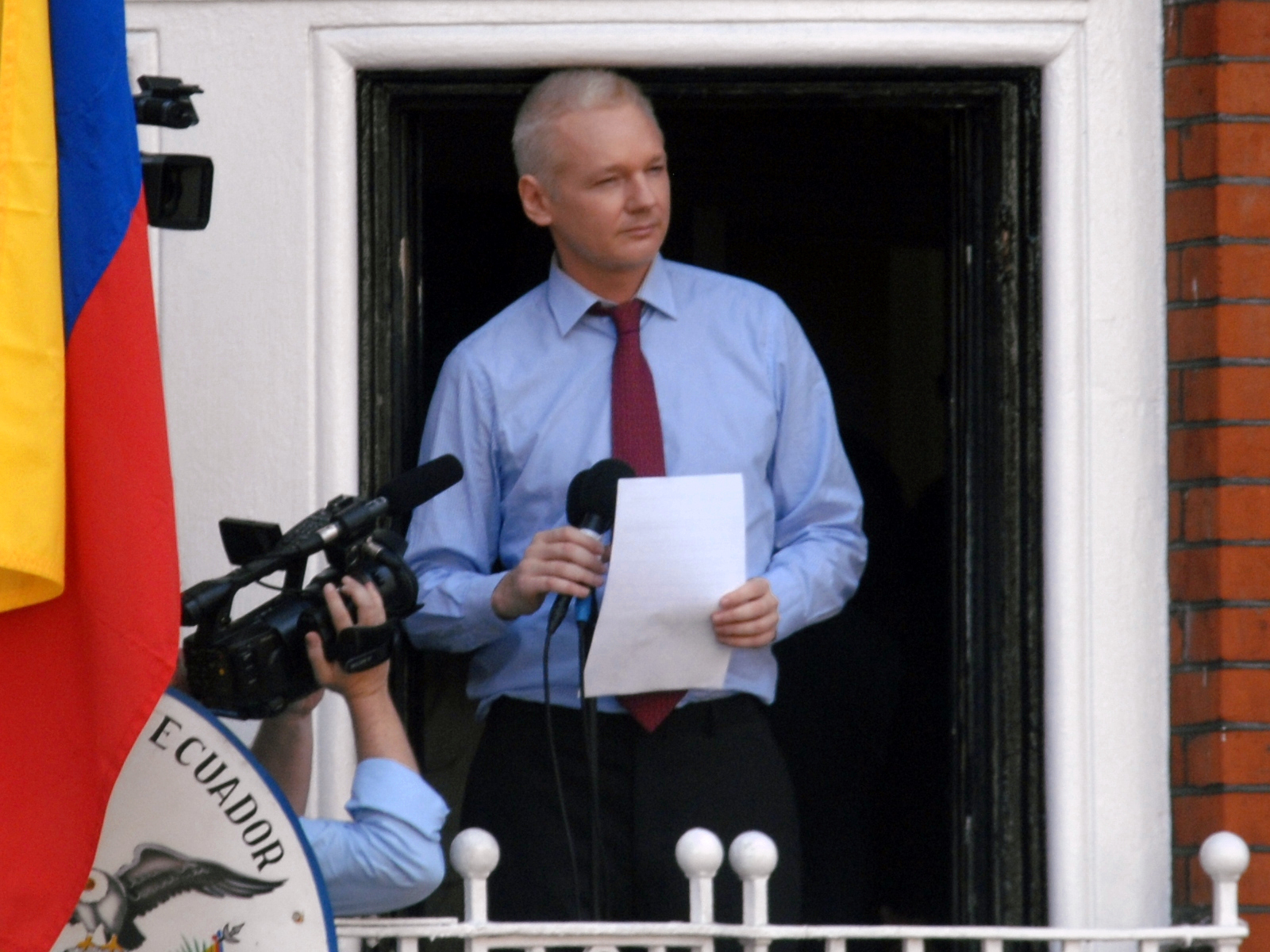
- Julian Assange at the Ecuadorian Embassy in 2012
- Date: 15 August 2012 – 2013
- Location: United Kingdom
- Caused by: Asylum granted by the Government of Ecuador to Julian Assange
- Result: Guayaquil Declaration

Parties
United Kingdom	Ecuador

Lead figures
(United Kingdom) David Cameron (British Prime Minister)	Rafael Correa (President of Ecuador)

A diplomatic crisis began on 15 August 2012, when the Ecuadorian government granted asylum to Julian Assange, creator of Wikileaks, at its embassy in the United Kingdom. Assange was under house arrest awaiting extradition to Sweden, who wanted to question him in relation to four charges of sexual assault.

Prior, Assange requested asylum from Ecuador on 19 June, and his request was granted almost two months later on 15 August. This measure was described as "negative" by British Foreign Secretary William Hague, who stated that Assange would be arrested when he left the facilities and added that diplomatic asylum was not applicable in his country.

The Ecuadorian government justified its decision by arguing that Assange's human rights could be violated in a hypothetical extradition from Sweden to the United States. However, the United Kingdom responded, arguing that it was "its duty" to bring to justice those wanted for such an extradition.

United States government spokesperson Victoria Nuland said that the US justice system has no requirements for Assange. Sweden, who requested extradition, expressed its disagreement and called its Ecuadorian ambassador consultations. The governments of Venezuela, Uruguay and Argentina supported Ecuador.

That same day, the Organization of American States (OAS) agreed to meet to discuss the crisis. On 18 August, Kristinn Hrafnsson from WikiLeaks said in a telephone conversation that Assange would speak from the embassy on 19 August about his situation, but that he could not give further details "for security reasons".

== Background ==
=== WikiLeaks ===
Julian Assange founded the WikiLeaks website in 2006, which he used to publish thousands of classified files from different governments around the world, including the United States. The documents were published on several occasions and were described by some governments as "improper". The publications led to the blocking of WikiLeaks funds (by the banks where they were held).

=== Charges in Sweden ===
In September 2010, Swedish Chief Prosecutor Marianne Ny ordered Assange's arrest for questioning in connection with two allegations of sexual assault. Following the prosecutor's request, Interpol issued a red notice (highest priority) seeking his arrest and extradition to Sweden in connection with alleged rape, sexual abuse and coercion charges.

In early December (of the same year) it became known that Assange might be hiding in southern England. And indeed, on 7 December, he turned himself in to the Metropolitan Police in London and was subsequently granted bail.

Assange's lawyers began a legal battle to prevent the extradition, arguing that the charges arose from a "dispute over unprotected but consensual sex" and that he would be taken from Sweden to the United States to be charged with espionage. On 24 February 2011 - in accordance with the request made by the Swedish courts - a British judge declared Assange's extradition to Sweden appropriate. The defence exhausted all possible appeals and postponements, but the Supreme Court of the United Kingdom rejected their arguments and ratified the granting of extradition on 13 June 2012.

== Refuge in the embassy ==
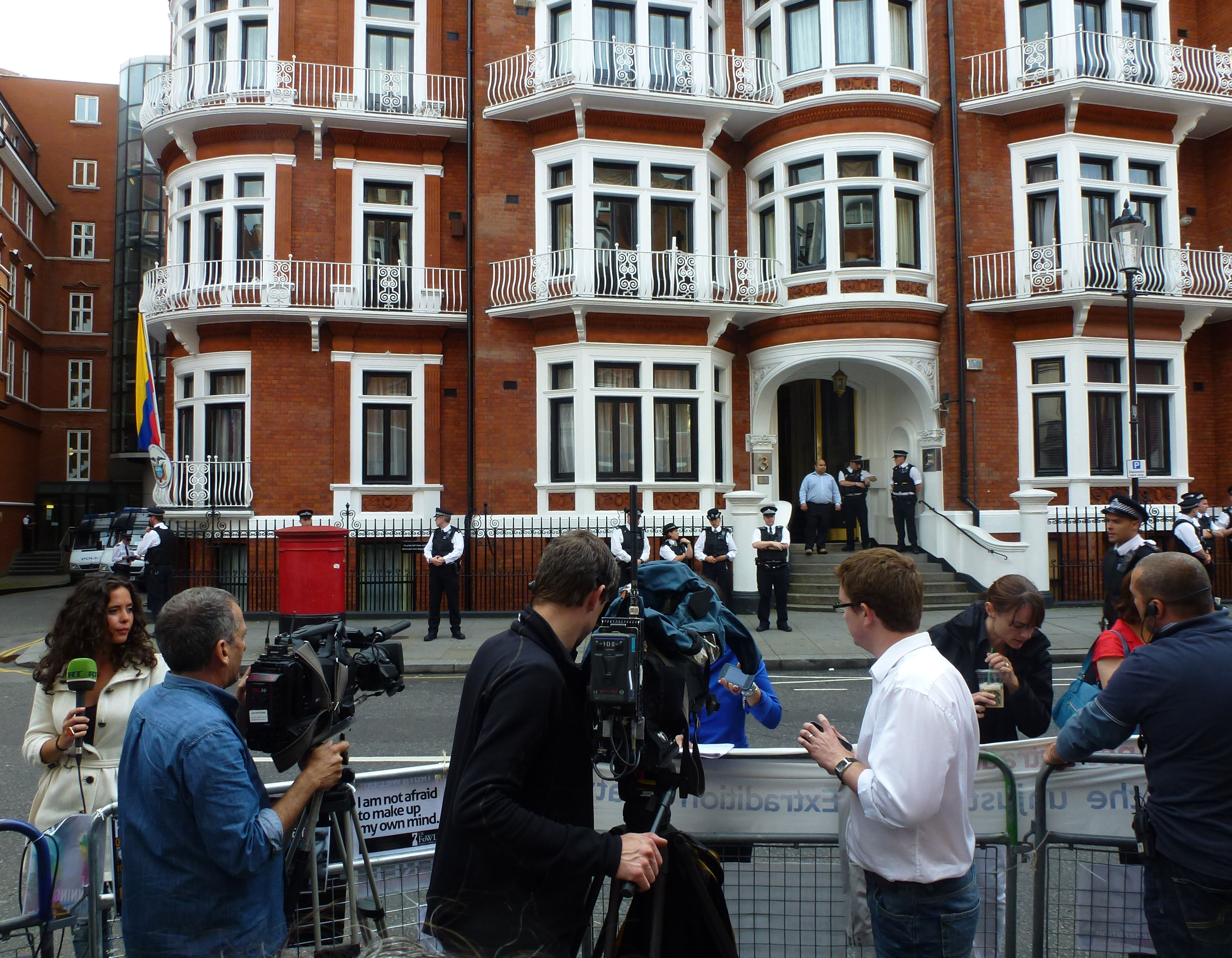
Embassy of the Republic of Ecuador in London, 16 August 2012

On Tuesday 19 June 2012, Assange violated his bail and escaped to take refuge in the Ecuadorian embassy in London. Scotland Yard officials went to the diplomatic headquarters to surround the perimeter and arrest Assange when he left the jurisdiction of the British police. That same day, Assange requested political asylum from the Ecuadorian government, to which - as an immediate but not definitive response - the government of Rafael Correa preferred to abstain from making its decision public, arguing that it would not distract public attention from the ongoing 2012 Summer Olympics.

The situation sparked protests in support of Assange, who activists claimed the case was political persecution.

=== Granting asylum ===
On 14 August 2012, Ecuadorian President Rafael Correa said that Julian Assange's request for political asylum was being studied as of that date by the authorities of his country and that the case would be evaluated taking into account, among other things, the statements made by the affected party in which he denounces his possible extradition to the United States, where, if found guilty of other charges, he could be sentenced to the death penalty, and that the human rights and security and physical integrity of Assange must be guaranteed.

On August 15, 2012, Ecuadorian Foreign Minister Ricardo Patiño - after a press conference- denounced that the British Government sent a note to the Ecuadorian ambassador in London, in which he had threatened to enter the diplomatic headquarters 'by force' to arrest Assange. The Ecuadorian Government described the situation as 'unfriendly'; the Government of David Cameron did not refer to it. A day later, Patiño made public the decision of his country's Government, in which Assange's request was granted, arguing Ecuador's sovereignty regarding the request and the moral obligation to guarantee the human rights of the accused.

== Reactions outside Ecuador ==
=== Support ===
- Venezuela through the then President of Venezuela, Hugo Chávez, said that if the United Kingdom dares to violate the sovereignty of Ecuador it would receive a response not only from Ecuador but from Venezuela, ALBA and UNASUR.
- Uruguay, Argentina and Bolivia expressed their support for the measure taken by the Ecuadorian government.
- Russia through the then President of Russia, Vladimir Putin, said that the United Kingdom has a double standard by granting political asylum to Boris Berezovsky or Akhmed Zakaiev, "people who have blood up to their elbows, who took up arms on our territory, who killed, are hiding in Great Britain." and that denying safe passage to Assange is more of a political issue.
- ALBA : Declared that entering the Ecuadorian Embassy would have serious consequences for the world, even declaring: "We reject the intimidating threats uttered by spokesmen of the United Kingdom government for violating the principles of sovereignty and territorial integrity of nations".
- UNASUR: Signed the Guayaquil Declaration in support of Ecuador, a document signed on August 19, 2012, with the participation of the foreign ministers of the member states. The document states that "On August 15, the Government of the Republic of Ecuador publicly reported having received a note from the United Kingdom threatening to “take action to arrest Mr. Assange at the current premises of the Embassy” (of Ecuador) invoking its national law on Diplomatic and Consular Premises of 1987 (Diplomatic and Consular Premises Act 1987)", adding that "The United Nations Security Council, in Press Release SC/10463 of November 29, 2011, condemned in the strongest terms violations of diplomatic immunity and recalled the fundamental principle of the inviolability of diplomatic missions and consular offices of receiving States in relation to the provisions of the 1961 Vienna Convention on Diplomatic Relations and the 1963 Vienna Convention on Consular Relations.
- 32 of the 34 members of the Organization of American States (OAS) supported Ecuador and agreed to reiterate "the full validity of the principles and norms that regulate diplomatic relations between States" and that "these principles and norms constitute fundamental rules to ensure peaceful coexistence among all countries that make up the international community ." The inter-American organization did not comment on granting asylum to Assange nor did it mention the alleged threats from the United Kingdom. Canada was the only State that did not support the resolution, although the United States expressed a reservation about the phrase by which the member States express "their solidarity and support for the Government of the Republic of Ecuador."
- The Andean Parliament rejected a possible violation of the jurisdiction of the Ecuadorian embassy in London by the United Kingdom, and gave its support to Ecuador for the asylum granted to Julian Assange.
- Julian Assange's mother, Christine Assange, has compared her son's case to the arrest of Augusto Pinochet in London which was echoed by international opinion and by President Correa himself.
- Intellectuals such as Noam Chomsky and Naomi Wolf, important Hollywood personalities such as directors Oliver Stone and Michael Moore or actor Danny Glover, comedian Bill Maher —who donated a million dollars to Barack Obama for his re-election— or Daniel Ellsberg, who leaked the 'Pentagon Papers', as well as the famous doctor Patch Adams are some of the more than 4,000 signatories of a letter that the organization Just Foreign Policy sent to the Ecuadorian Embassy in London on August 21. In the letter they urge the president of that country, Rafael Correa, to execute Julian Assange's request for asylum to avoid the risk of being extradited to the United States.

=== Neutral ===
- European Union: The European Union as a whole did not comment on the case, saying that it was "a bilateral diplomatic matter." They did, however, urge both countries to resolve the conflict through dialogue.
- United States and Australia: The US and Australian governments have said they will not take sides. The United States has said it does not agree with the move, Australia has made preparations in the event that Assange is extradited to the US.
- Chile: The Chilean government, for its part, refused to take sides in the situation, stating that "it is a problem between Ecuador and Great Britain" and that "they will have to resolve it bilaterally".

=== Opposition ===
- United Kingdom: British Foreign Secretary William Hague said that the decision of the Ecuadorian government is regrettable. And that the granting of asylum "will not change things", since Scotland Yard - he added - will remain ready for the immediate arrest and subsequent extradition of Assange. Therefore, the safe conduct that Assange needs to leave - as an asylum seeker - British soil will not be granted to him.
- Sweden: The Swedish government also regretted Ecuador's decision. It called the ambassador of that country in Sweden for consultations. On the other hand, it has explained that Sweden does not extradite anyone to a State that can apply the death penalty to the extradited person.
- Journalism associations and part of the world press believe that President Rafael Correa has adopted such a measure to improve his image, affected by his clashes with the Ecuadorian media and by the accusations he has received of restricting press freedom.
- The Ecuadorian community residing in England led by Luis Felipe Tilleria, carried out 4 plans against the granting of asylum.
- Mario Vargas Llosa has said that Assange "is a fugitive from justice who uses his aura as a martyr of freedom of expression to avoid responding to the accusations against him.

== Reactions within Ecuador ==
- Some Ecuadorian opposition leaders have described President Correa's decision to grant asylum to Julian Assange as paradoxical.
- According to Andrés Oppenheimer, in El Nuevo Herald, the Ecuadorian journalist Emilio Palacio - who has been prosecuted by the Ecuadorian president - has stated that Correa's campaign in favour of Assange has the purpose of both repairing his image as an "enemy" of freedom of the press, as well as gaining political space to become the leader of ALBA after the death of Hugo Chávez. Statements rejected by President Correa, who said that the former journalist of the newspaper El Universo was lying about the reasons why he was prosecuted by him.

== See also ==
- United States diplomatic cables leak
- Alexander Barankov
