= Juan Falconí Puig =

Ecuadorian lawyer and diplomat

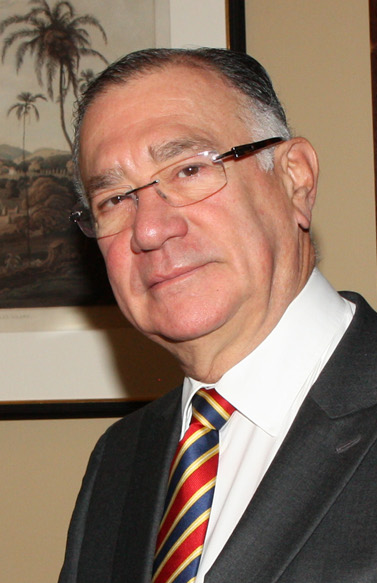
Juan Falconí Puig (2013)

Juan Falconi Puig (born in Guayaquil, Ecuador) is a doctor in law, university professor, columnist, and politician. In 2013, he was appointed Ambassador of Ecuador to the United Kingdom. In 2015, he was appointed to represent Ecuador as Permanent Ambassador to the World Trade Organization, headquartered in Geneva, Switzerland.

Throughout his career, Falconi has served his country from several high offices of government and high-profile appointments, such as minister of industry and commerce in January 1991; and years later as Minister State Secretary for Production. In October 1999, after the 1998-99 crisis, in April 2000 he served as Bank Superintendent and as such he led important decisions and conducted and investigated into the Filanbanco case, the most important one at the center of said crisis. Filanbanco was owned by the Isaias Dassum brothers and was transferred to the Government in December 1998 in order to avoid bankruptcy. Up until that time, everything pertaining to said case had remained hidden.

== Biography ==
He is the son of Ricardo Falconi Ledesma, lawyer, and the writer and poet, María Eugenia Puig Lince. He also has three children: Priscilla Falconi, Juan Xavier Falconi, and Santiago Falconi. He also has four granddaughters: Martina, Manuela, Mia and Maria Jose. Falconi graduated from the Universidad Católica de Guayaquil in December 1975 or 1976 and three years later he obtained his Doctorate in Jurisprudence at said university.

== Early career ==
=== Academic activities ===
Early in 1975, he starter as a professor in Civil Procedural Law at the Catholic University of Guayaquil, and the following year he was appointed as Director of Studies for that area. In June 1982 he was elected as faculty representative to the Board of Directors of the College of Law at said university and was elected Dean in 1984. In August 1986 he presided over the Faculty Discipline Tribunal at said university.

=== Attorney at Law ===
In March 1979 Juan Falconi was elected fellow of the legal section of the Guayaquil Bar Association for Civil Procedure matters. In 1985 he was appointed Chief Arbitrator of the Court of Arbitration of the Chamber of Commerce of Guayaquil and Permanent Associate Magistrate of the Superior Court of Justice of Guayaquil. In 1988, he became a member of the Advisory Commission of the Court of Constitutional Guarantees and Permanent Justice of the Supreme Court of Justice in June 1999.

=== Political activities ===
In December 1976 he became secretary of the municipality of Guayaquil. In March 1981, he became Vice President of the International Chamber of Commerce of Ecuador. He was named Minister of Industry, Trade, Integration, and Fisheries in January 1991, President of the Cartagena Agreement Commission in December 1991, President of Ecuadorian National Committee of the International Chamber of Commerce in October 1992, Secretary of State Minister for Production in October 1999, and President of the Board of Foreign Trade and Investment (COMEXI) in January 2000.

== Ecuadorian financial crisis and afterwards ==
=== Filanbanco Case ===
During the administration of President Jamil Mahuad, Ecuador eliminated its national currency, the Sucre, and adopted the United States Dollar.14 Filanbanco, for many years one of the main banking institutions of Ecuador, was considered solid enough to survive the economic crisis of 1998–99. However, due to its insolvency and lack of liquidity, Filanbanco was transferred under the management of the AGD - the Deposit Guarantee Agency, and owing to its lack of financial health, Filanbanco collapsed in 2001. The owners of Filanbanco, the Isaias Dassum brothers, did not repay the loans they had granted to themselves and taken out from the bank. In 2000, as Bank Superintendent, Dr. Juan Falconi Puig, filed a complaint against Roberto Isaías, his brothers and others involved, which ended in an enforceable sentence by the Supreme Court having found Roberto Isaias, his brothers and other officers guilty as charged. Before that, Dr. Hernan Ulloa, Judge of the Supreme Court of Justice, publicly denounced, by TV and the press, having been the subject of a bribery attempt for the Isaias brothers to be exonerated along with their collaborators in said case. Then the Criminal Court, today National Court of Justice, on 10 April 2012, found Roberto Isaias, William Isaias, Juan Franco, and others guilty of embezzlement as perpetrators responsible for embezzlement. They were sentenced to 8 years of special imprisonment; and, the same court dismissed an appeal in 2013. Falconi flatly denied any responsibility for the confiscation of the Isaias family assets in 2008, however, he did say he was in favor of the measure. Almost two years after the brothers Roberto and William Isaias were sentenced, the National Court of Justice (CNJ, in Spanish) ratified, on 13 March 2014, the ruling that had sentenced the former owners of the Filanbanco to 8 years in prison for embezzlement.

Given that Filanbanco had collapsed in 2001, the government filed a suit against the owners of Filanbanco, the brothers Isaias-Dassum, for embezzlement. The Criminal Court of the National Court of Justice, found Roberto Isaias, William Isaias, Juan Franco and others guilty on 10 April 2012, sentencing them to 8 years in prison; and the Cassation Court dismissed said appeal in the year 2013. 15 Falconi flatly denied being responsible for the confiscation of the Isaias family assets in 2008, however, he did say he was in favor of the measure, which was legal and belated.16 17 18 19 Almost two years after the brothers Roberto and William Isaias, the National Court of Justice (CNJ) ratified on 13 March 2014 the ruling that sentenced the former owners of Filanbanco to 8 years in prison for embezzlement.

In March 2002, before the Supreme Court of Justice, Falconi filed a prevarication complaint against Public Prosecutor Mariana Yepez, Prosecutor Guillermo Mosquera, former president of the CSJ Galo Pico, as well as the Prosecuting agent of the Financial Investigations Unit for Public Office, Jorge Montero22 all linked to the Isaias.

Given that Filanbanco had collapsed in 2001, the government filed a suit against the owners of Filanbanco, the brothers Isaias-Dassum, for embezzlement. The Criminal Court of the National Court of Justice, found Roberto Isaias, William Isaias, Juan Franco and others guilty on 10 April 2012, sentencing them to 8 years in prison; and the Cassation Court dismissed said appeal in the year 2013. 15 Falconi flatly denied being responsible for the confiscation of the Isaias family assets in 2008, however, he did say he was in favor of the measure, which was legal and belated.16 17 18 19 Almost two years after the brothers Roberto and William Isaias, the National Court of Justice (CNJ) ratified on 13 March 2014 the ruling that sentenced the former owners of Filanbanco to 8 years in prison for embezzlement.

In March 2002, before the Supreme Court of Justice, Falconi filed a prevarication complaint against Public Prosecutor Mariana Yepez, Prosecutor Guillermo Mosquera, former president of the CSJ Galo Pico, as well as the Prosecuting agent of the Financial Investigations Unit for Public Office, Jorge Montero22 all linked to the Isaias.

== Selected publications ==
- Compañías: Su formación, costos e índice alfabético de la Ley. Corporación de Estudios y Publicaciones, Quito. 1977.
- Integración e Inversión Extranjera: Corporación de Estudios y Publicaciones. 1979.
- Ley de Compañías: Costos de formación e Indice Alfabético de la Ley. Second edition: Corporación de Estudios y Publicaciones, Quito. 1980.
- La Administración de Justicia en el Proceso Moderno. Conferencia. Universidad Católica de Guayaquil. 1983.
- Código de Procedimiento Civil: Concordancias, Leyes Conexas, Jurisprudencia, Resoluciones de la Corte Suprema de Justicia y comentarios. 1990. Second edition: 1991. Reprint: 2001.
- Documentos del Caso Filanbanco: II Tomos. 2002.
- Conferencia “Etica y Función Pública”. Universidad Católica de Santiago de Guayaquil. 2005.
- Lecture on Ethics and Public Office - “Ética y Función Pública”. Universidad Católica de Santiago de Guayaquil. 2005.
- Immunidad Parliamentaria. Universidad Católica de Santiago de Guayaquil. 2006.
- Estudios Procesales. Corporación de Estudios y Publicaciones - Quito del 2012.32

== Journalism ==
Falconi has written articles for the editorial pages of Diario El Universo, El Comercio, and Diario HOY of Quito since 1984. .

== Honors and awards ==
In 1973, 1974, and 1975, Falconí won student awards conferred by the Law Students' Association of the Universidad Católica de Guayaquil.

In January 2014 he received recognition from Universidad Católica as a Professor and Dean between 1984 and 1986.

The Colegio de Abogados del Guayas nominate as lawyer of the year, 1997.

The Colegio de Abogados del Guayas grant him with the Merit Recognition year 2019
