= Diplomatic law =

Area of international law

Diplomatic law is that area of international law that governs permanent and temporary diplomatic missions. A fundamental concept of diplomatic law is that of diplomatic immunity, which derives from state immunity.

Key elements of diplomatic law are the immunity of diplomatic staff, the inviolability of the diplomatic mission and its grounds, and the security of diplomatic correspondence and diplomatic bags. Famous cases involving the breaking of diplomatic laws includes the Iran hostage crisis in 1979, the shooting of a British police woman (Murder of Yvonne Fletcher) from the Libyan Embassy in London in 1984, and the discovery of a former Nigerian Minister in a diplomatic crate at Stansted airport in 1984.

It is also an accepted principle of customary international law and is recognised between countries as a matter of practicality. Diplomatic law is often strictly adhered to by states because it works on reciprocity. For example, if a country expels diplomats from another country, then its diplomats would most likely be expelled from the other country.

== Sources of diplomatic law ==
For most of history diplomatic law has mostly been customary. However, early codifications of diplomatic law include the British Diplomatic Privileges Act 1708. An important treaty with regards to diplomatic law is the 1961 Vienna Convention on Diplomatic Relations. Questions not expressly regulated by the Convention continue to be governed by the rules of customary international law.

== Diplomatic immunity ==
The most fundamental rule of diplomatic law is that the person of a diplomatic agent is inviolable. Diplomats may not be detained or arrested, and enjoy complete immunity from criminal prosecution in the receiving state, although there is no immunity from the jurisdiction of the sending state.

The only remedy the host state has in the face of offences alleged to have been committed by a diplomat is to declare him or her persona non grata, which typically means that the diplomat must leave the territory of the state. In 1999, for example, an attaché of the Russian Embassy in Washington DC was declared persona non grata for suspected "bugging" of the State Department.

The UN Convention on the Prevention and Punishment of Crimes against Internationally Protected Persons, Including Diplomatic Agents was adopted in 1973. It provides that states parties must make attacks upon diplomats a crime in internal law, and obliges them to extradite or prosecute offenders. However, in exceptional cases, a diplomat may be arrested or detained on the basis of self-defence or in the interests of protecting human life.

The private residence, papers, correspondence and property of diplomats are also inviolable. In general, diplomats are immune from civil and administrative jurisdiction of the state in which they are serving, although there are a number of important exceptions.

=== Waiver of immunity ===
Although it is unusual, the sending state may expressly waive the immunity from jurisdiction of diplomatic agents and others possessing immunity.

== Diplomatic premises ==
It is an absolute rule that the premises of the mission are inviolable and agents of the receiving state cannot enter them without the consent of the mission.

The receiving state is under a special duty to protect the mission premises from intrusion or damage or "impairment of its dignity". By the same token, the premises of a mission must not be used in a way which is incompatible with the functions of the mission.

== Diplomatic bag ==
The receiving state is required to permit and protect free communication on behalf of the mission for all official purposes. Such official communication is inviolable and may include the use of diplomatic couriers and messages in code and in cipher, although the consent of the receiving state is required for a wireless transmitter.

== Diplomatic relations ==
There is no right under international law to diplomatic relations, and they exist by virtue of mutual consent. The sending state must ensure that the consent of the receiving state has been given for its proposed head of mission. Similarly, the receiving state may at any time declare any member of the diplomatic mission persona non grata and thus obtain the removal of that person.

== Diplomatic asylum ==
A right of diplomatic asylum is not universally established in international law. The International Court of Justice has emphasised that in the absence of treaty or customary rules to the contrary, a decision by a mission to grant asylum involves a derogation from the sovereignty of the receiving state. The Organization of American States agreed a convention in 1954.

== Bibliography ==
- Eileen Denza, Diplomatic Law: Commentary on the Vienna Convention on Diplomatic Relations (Oxford: Oxford University Press, 1998).
