= José Valencia Amores =

Ecuadorian diplomat

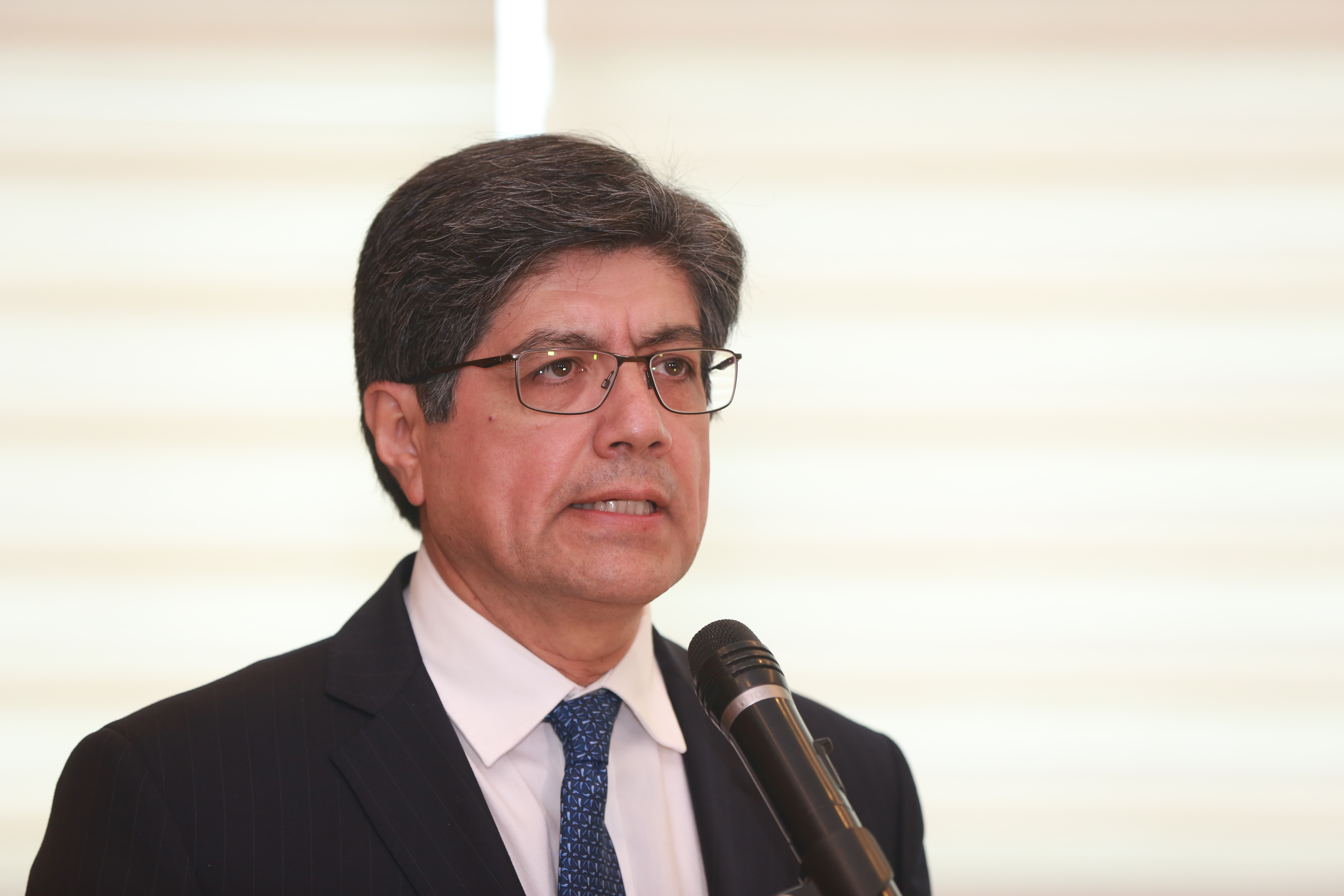

Minister of Foreign Affairs
- In office 13 June 2018 – 9 July 2020
- President: Lenín Moreno
- Preceded by: María Fernanda Espinosa
- Succeeded by: Luis Gallegos

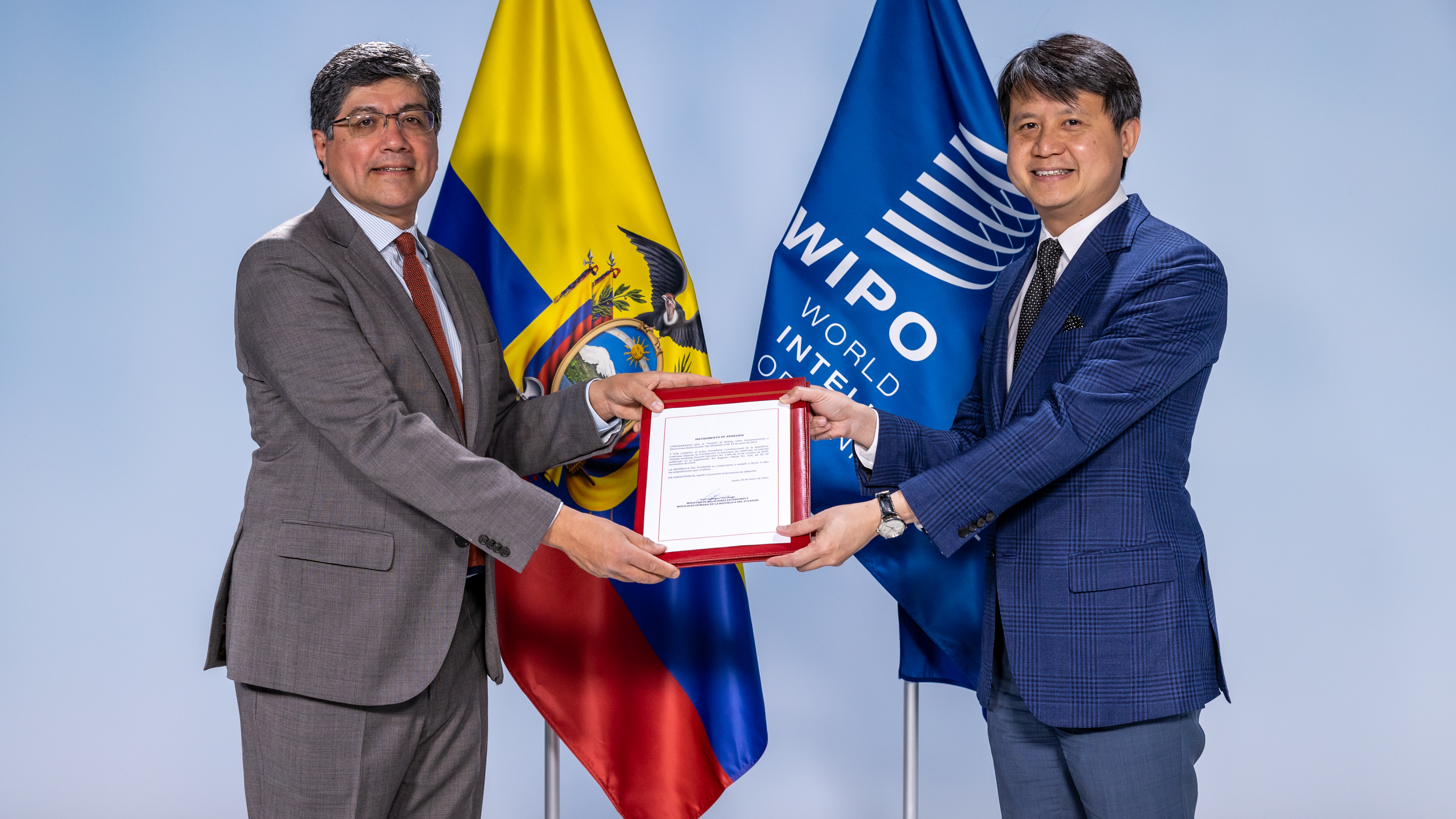
José Valencia Amores in May 2021

José Valencia Amores (born 18 February 1961) is an Ecuadorian diplomat and lawyer, who served as Minister of Foreign Affairs of Ecuador between 2019 and 2020, designated by president Lenín Moreno. Currently, he serves as representative of Ecuador to the World Trade Organization.

He studied law at the Catholic University of Ecuador.
