= Embassy of Ecuador, London =

Diplomatic mission of Ecuador in London

Embassy of Ecuador in London
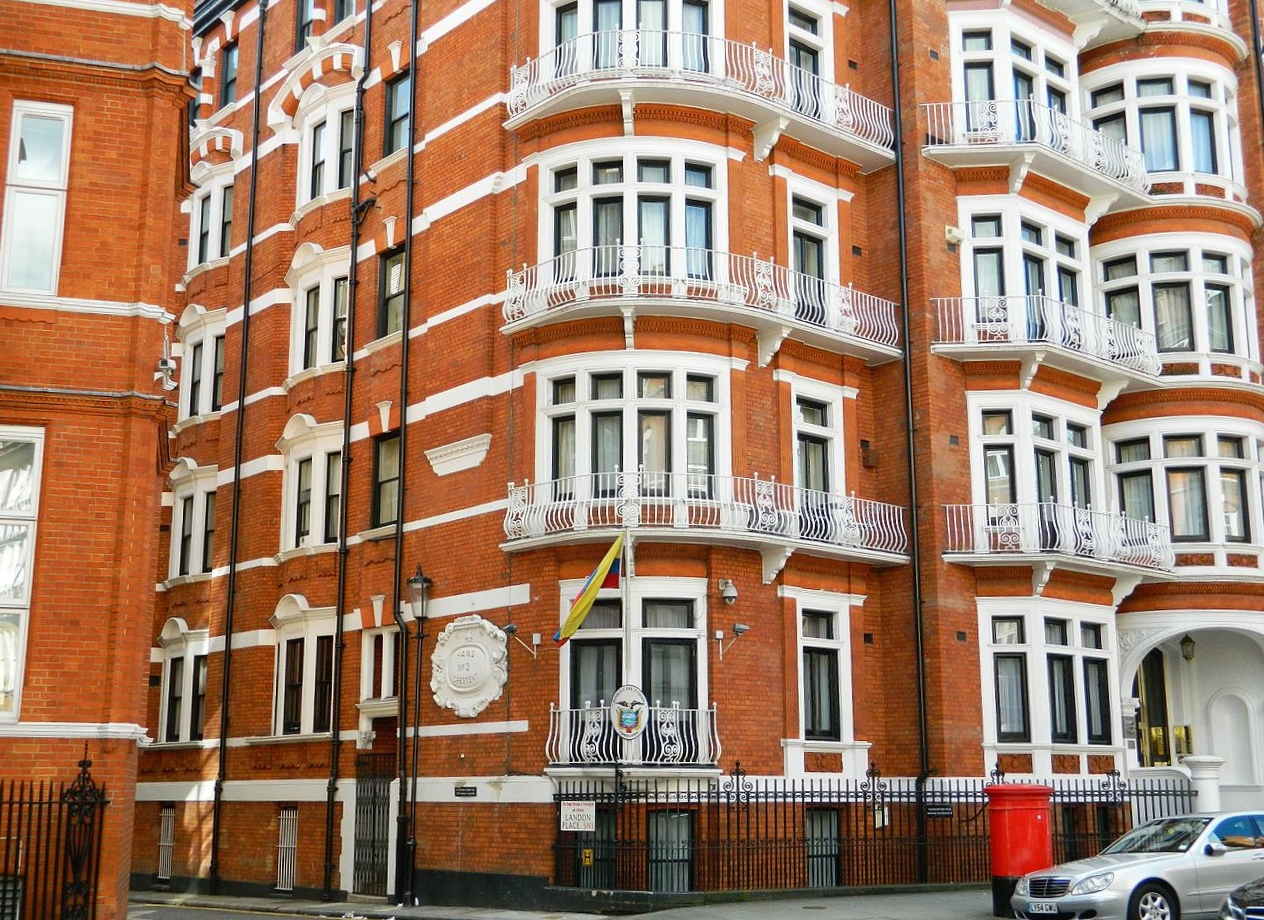
- Location: Knightsbridge, London
- Address: 3 Hans Crescent, London, SW1
- Coordinates: 51.4990°N 0.1614°W
- Ambassador: Jaime Marchan-Romero

The Embassy of Ecuador in London is the diplomatic mission of Ecuador in the United Kingdom. It is headed by the ambassador of Ecuador to the United Kingdom. It is located in the Knightsbridge area of London, in the Royal Borough of Kensington and Chelsea. It is in an apartment building which also houses the Embassy of Colombia as well as a number of residential apartments, near Harrods, Hyde Park, and Hans Place, at 3 Hans Crescent at the intersection with Basil Street, and it is close to Knightsbridge Underground station.

For almost seven years the embassy was home to the Australian activist and journalist Julian Assange, who initially entered on 19 June 2012 claiming diplomatic asylum, which was granted by the Ecuadorian government on 16 August 2012. He had absconded in breach of bail after dismissal of his appeal by the Supreme Court of the United Kingdom.

== Functions ==
The embassy is charged with representing the interests of the president and government of Ecuador, improving diplomatic relations between Ecuador and the accredited countries, promoting and improving the image and standing of Ecuador in the accredited nations, promoting the culture of Ecuador, encouraging and facilitating tourism to and from Ecuador, and ensuring the safety of Ecuadorians abroad.

The structure that houses the embassy is a white stucco-fronted red-brick building on Hans Crescent in the Knightsbridge area of London. The embassy is a suite of rooms occupying part of the ground floor of the building, which is an apartment block.

Ecuador also maintains a consulate at 144-146 Kings Cross Road, London WC1X 9DU and an Office of the Naval Assistant and Permanent Representative to the International Maritime Organization at 61 Wimbledon Hill Road, Wimbledon, London.

== Julian Assange's refuge (2012–2019) ==
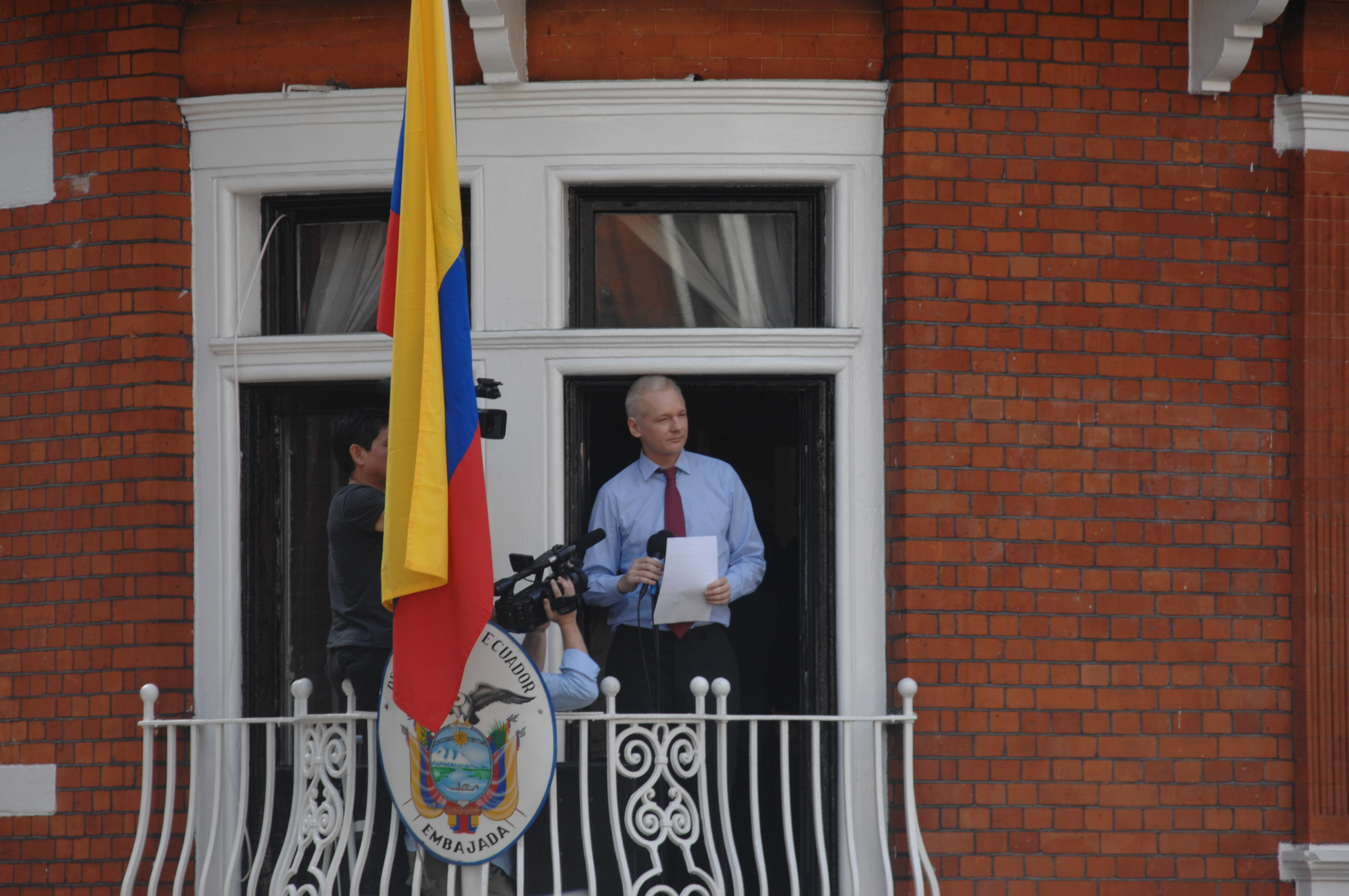
Julian Assange at the Ecuadorian embassy in August 2012

The co-founder of WikiLeaks, Julian Assange, was a resident of the embassy for seven years after entering it on 19 June 2012 to claim diplomatic asylum after being wanted by Swedish authorities for questioning over four alleged sexual offences. Assange's asylum request was eventually granted by the Ecuadorian government in August 2012. The Swedish prosecutors dropped their investigation in May 2017, claiming they could not expect the Ecuadorian Embassy to communicate reliably with Assange with respect to the case.

The British government had suggested it could use its discretionary powers under the Diplomatic and Consular Premises Act 1987 to enter the embassy and arrest Assange after giving the embassy due notice. However, it later retracted the suggestion, following condemnation from Ecuador's Foreign Minister Ricardo Patiño and President Rafael Correa. Patiño described the British government's statement as "a clear breach of international law and the protocols set out in the Vienna Convention."

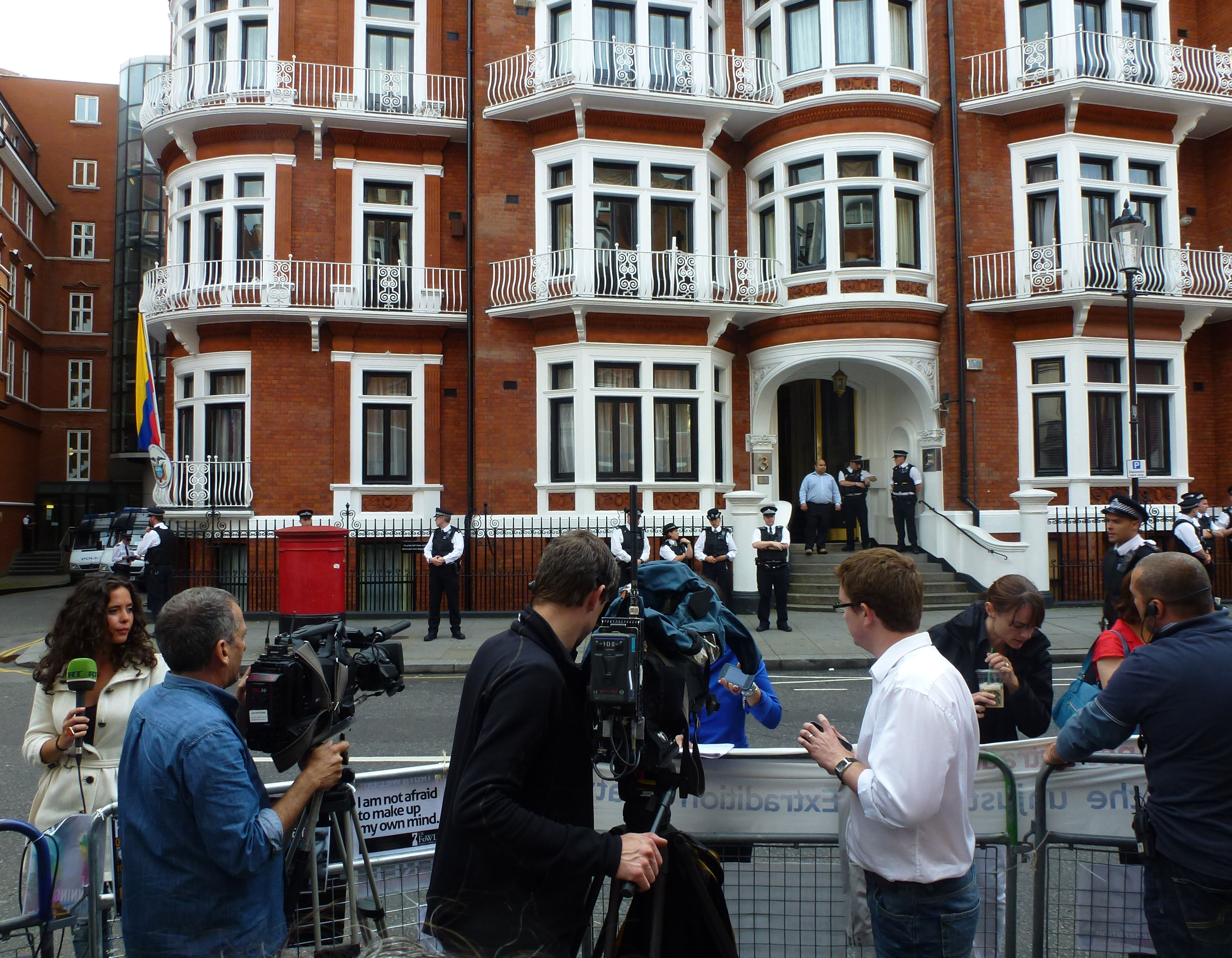
Press outside the embassy in August 2012

On 16 August 2012, police and protesters gathered outside the embassy, with reports of minor scuffles between the two groups and arrests of some of the protesters. On 19 August 2012, Assange made a speech from a low balcony of the embassy. Assange's remarks were prefaced by a statement from Baltasar Garzón, who headed his legal team. This was followed by protests in Ecuador outside the British embassy in Quito, as well as support for Correa's approval of the asylum request.

On 22 August 2012, the Ecuadorian President Rafael Correa stated that Assange would be allowed to stay in the embassy indefinitely, but that Ecuador would be open to negotiations with the British government if it withdrew its threats to storm the embassy.

In August 2014, Assange called a press conference and announced he would be leaving the embassy "soon".

Press photographs taken outside the embassy were reported to have shown police notes stating that Assange was to be arrested "under all circumstances". The policing of the embassy during the first two years of Assange's stay reportedly cost £6.5 million. Before the police guard was lifted in February 2015, costs of policing Assange had reached £10 million.

The Guardian revealed in May 2018 that Ecuador had employed an international security company for more than five years to monitor Assange's visitors.

On 3 April 2019, WikiLeaks claimed that the Ecuadorian embassy would expel Assange within a few hours or days but Jose Valencia, Foreign Minister of Ecuador called it a rumour. Two days later the statements of Assange's departure came after the Ecuadorian President Lenin Moreno accused Assange of repeatedly violating the terms of asylum. On 11 April 2019, Assange was arrested by British authorities who were invited into the embassy by the Ecuadorian government.

== See also ==
- Embassy of Colombia, London
