= July 12, 2007, Baghdad airstrike =

Series of air-to-ground attacks during the Iraqi insurgency

- Part of the Iraq War
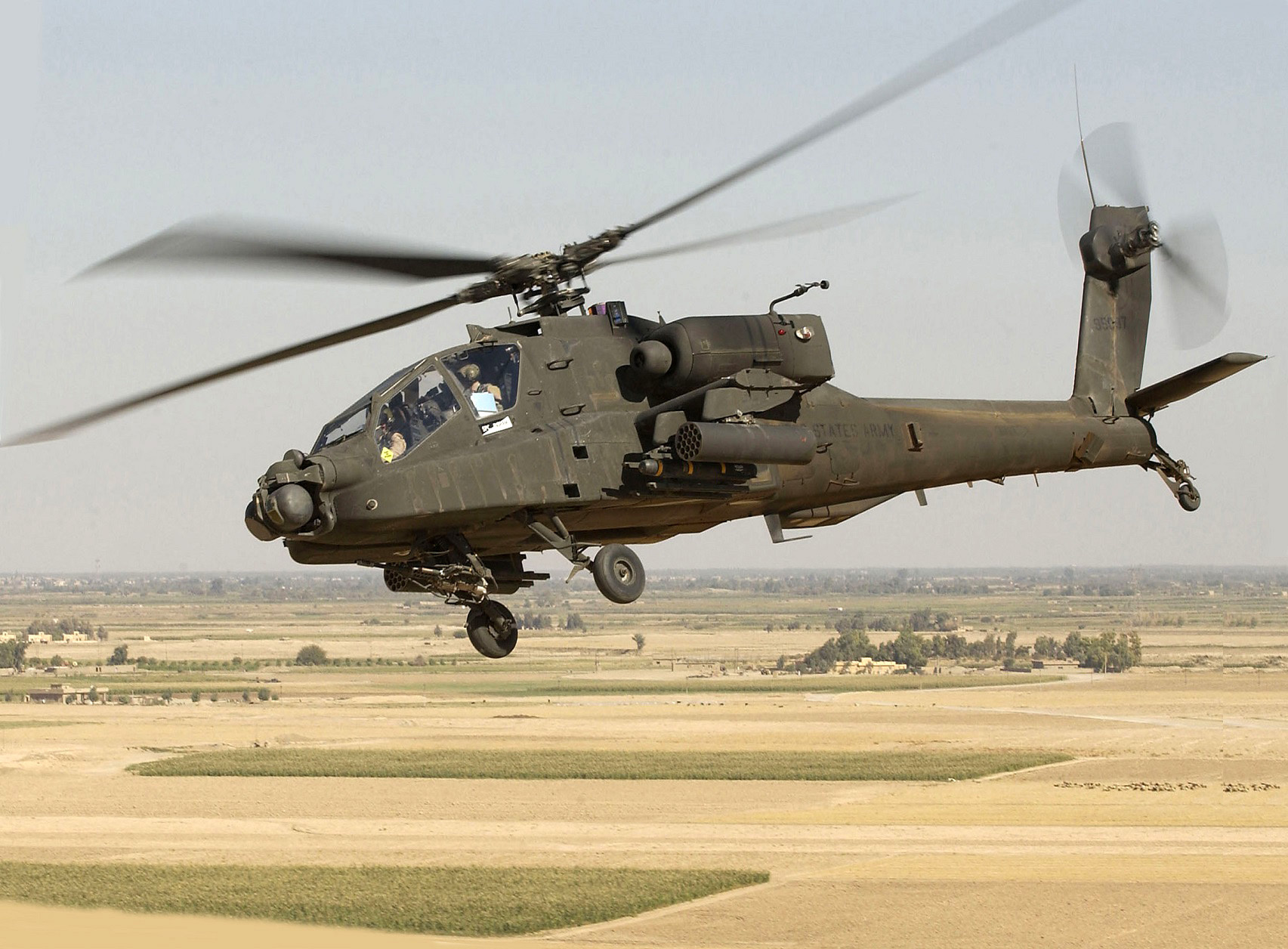
- An AH-64 Apache helicopter, the type used in the attack
- Type: Airstrike
- Location: New Baghdad, Baghdad, Iraq; 33.3137°N 44.512°E
- Date: July 12, 2007
- Executed by: United States Army
- Casualties: 12–18+ civilians killed 2 children injured

On July 12, 2007, a series of air-to-ground attacks were conducted by a team of two U.S. AH-64 Apache helicopters in Al-Amin al-Thaniyah, New Baghdad, during the Iraqi insurgency which followed the invasion of Iraq. On April 5, 2010, the attacks received worldwide coverage and controversy following the release of 39 minutes of classified gunsight footage by WikiLeaks. The video, which WikiLeaks titled Collateral Murder, showed the crew firing on a group of people and killing several of them, including two Reuters journalists, and then laughing at some of the casualties, all of whom were civilians. An anonymous U.S. military official confirmed the authenticity of the footage, which provoked global discussion on the legality and morality of the attacks.

In the first strike, the crews of two Apaches directed 30 mm cannon fire at a group of ten Iraqi men. Among the group were two Iraqi war correspondents working for Reuters, Saeed Chmagh and Namir Noor-Eldeen. Seven men (including Noor-Eldeen) were killed during this first strike; Chmagh, who was injured, died in the second strike.

The second strike, also using 30 mm rounds, was directed at a van whose driver, Saleh Matasher Tomal, drove by and helped the wounded Chmagh. Both Chmagh and Tomal were killed in the second strike, and two of Tomal's children were badly wounded.

In a third strike, Apache pilots watched people, including some armed men, run into a building and attacked the building with several AGM-114 Hellfire missiles.

== Context ==
According to Tom Raju, a reporter at CNN, "the soldiers of Bravo Company, 2–16 Infantry had been under fire all morning from rocket-propelled grenades and small arms on the first day of Operation Ilaaj in Baghdad". Al Jazeera stated that the Army had received "reports of small arms fire", but were unable to positively identify the gunmen. Apache helicopters were called in by a soldier in the Humvee (Hotel 2–6) under attack from the same position used by Namir Noor-Eldeen to photograph the vehicle. According to a military review, soldiers in that company "had been under sporadic small arms and rocket propelled grenade fire since" the operation—described as "clearing their sector and looking for weapons caches"—began.

The Air Weapons Team (AWT) of two Apache AH-64s from the 1st Cavalry Division had been requested by the 2nd Battalion, 16th Infantry Regiment (2–16), 4th Brigade Combat Team, 1st Infantry Division under the command of Lieutenant Colonel Ralph Kauzlarich, before July 12 to support Operation Ilaaj. Tasked to conduct escort, armed reconnaissance patrols, and counter-IED and counter-mortar operations, the two helicopters left Camp Taji at 9:24 a.m. They arrived on station in New Baghdad at 9:53 a.m., where sporadic attacks on coalition forces continued.

== Incidents ==
The first part of the video released by WikiLeaks, showing the first attack, on a group of men and the second attack, on a van. This is 13 minutes of onboard footage from one of the two AH-64 Apache helicopters involved in the incident released by WikiLeaks. This video is from the editorialized version of Collateral Murder but has had the editorial removed. (Full audio transcript) Other video clips including the full 39-minute footage and clips corresponding to the Army report exhibits were also made available by WikiLeaks.

=== Attack on personnel ===
In the video on the morning of July 12, 2007, the crews of two United States Army AH-64 Apache helicopters observe a gathering of men near a section of Baghdad in the path of advancing U.S. ground troops. The crew estimates the group is twenty men. Among the group are two journalists working for Reuters, Namir Noor-Eldeen and Saeed Chmagh. While the two are carrying media cards, a military officer claimed they were not wearing distinctive clothing identifying themselves as such. Noor-Eldeen has a camera and Chmagh is talking on his mobile phone. Two other men in the group appear to have rifles. Another has a long cylindrical object which a U.S. army general investigating the incident said was a rocket-propelled grenade.

The Apache gunner says that there are "five to six individuals with AK-47s" and requests permission to engage the group which is granted. Noor-Eldeen walks ahead of the group and peers around a street corner to aim his long-lensed camera at U.S. Humvees which are about 100 metres down the street. Noor-Eldeen's camera is misidentified by the Apache gunner who says "He's got an RPG!" Three pictures of the U.S. Humvee were found on his camera's memory card when it was recovered by U.S. soldiers. The men become obscured behind a building as the Apache moves around the group. Both helicopters strafe a group of ten men with 30 mm rounds once they became visible again. After the lead helicopter fires, one of the crew shouts "Hahaha. I hit 'em" and another member of the crew responds, "Oh yeah, look at those dead bastards".

Seven men were killed, including Noor-Eldeen, with three others being wounded. Once the group is eliminated, the Apache pilots direct the ground troops to move up to the position of the attack to clear the area.

=== Attack on a van ===
As the ground troops advanced, a wounded Chmagh was seen crawling and attempting to stand. As the U.S. soldiers moved towards the site of the attack, a van stopped near Chmagh. The military said that the van was "fair game under Army rules", because it had no visible markings to suggest it was an ambulance or a protected vehicle. The Apache crew alerted the ground troops of the van and requested permission to engage the vehicle before the ground troops arrived. The Apache crew saw unarmed men exit the vehicle and move to Chmagh. The Apache crew requested permission to engage, stating it "looks like [the men] possibly, picking up bodies and weapons" from the scene, and repeated their request to shoot, before they received permission to begin firing on the van and its occupants. Chmagh was killed along with three other men, while two children, not known to be in the van to the U.S. forces, were injured. The children, a girl and boy, suffered injuries. The girl suffered from a stomach wound and glass in her eyes, and the boy a head injury. Just as the van was destroyed, U.S. ground troops made their final turn and arrived on the road with the van. The Apache crew then alerted the ground troops that they believed that they could see an injured child moving around inside the destroyed van. On the video, it is then seen that Army soldiers establish a perimeter around the site and extract the children from the burning van. When the helicopter pilots discover that they have killed Iraqi civilians and wounded two children, one of them is heard to say: "Well, it's their fault for bringing their kids into a battle".

=== Attack on a building ===
The ground troops who secured the site of the first two strikes then receive small arms fire from nearby buildings.

There is a period of 20 minutes not included on the leaked tape. According to the internal legal review, the helicopters engaged a group of armed insurgents, and that some were seen entering a nearby building.

As the tape resumes, two men, one holding an AK-47, are seen walking. They split up and the footage follows one who appears to be armed. He walks into a building which has been identified as the source of fire at U.S. ground troops. They request permission to fire a missile at the building, describing it as "abandoned" or "under construction". The ground controller responds, "If you've [positively identified] the individuals in the building with weapons, go ahead and engage the building". As the pilot positions the helicopter to attack the building, two unarmed men walk towards, and perhaps into, the building. As the gunner fires the first missile, another man is seen walking along the street in front of the building. The missile hits the building, and the man is caught in the explosion. The crew then reposition the helicopter and fire two more missiles into the upper floors of the building.

==== Commentary ====
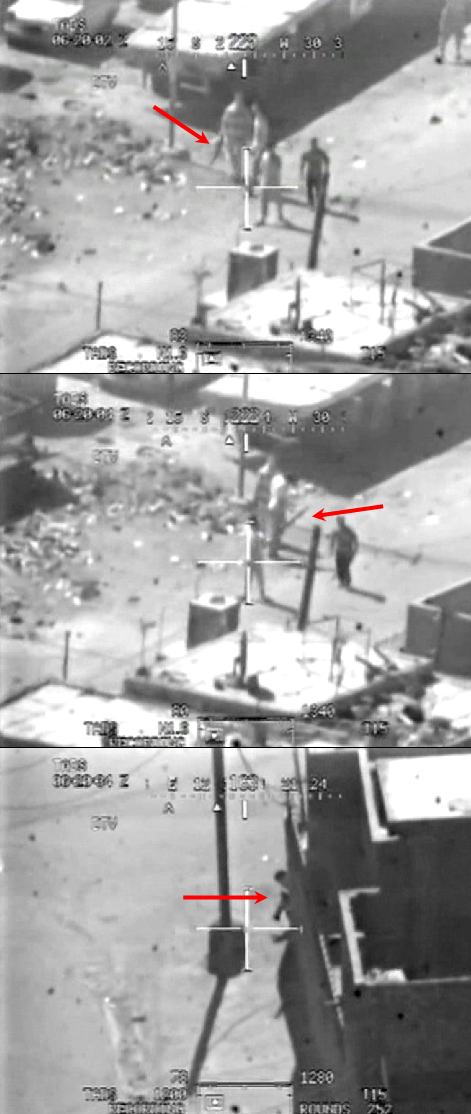
Blurry still frames from the leaked video with individuals perhaps carrying long zoom cameras, weapons and/or plays of shadow and light

WikiLeaks said in the preface to their shorter video of the incident that "some of the men appear to have been armed [although] the behavior of nearly everyone was relaxed". Julian Assange said "permission to engage was given before the word 'RPG' was ever used". Politifact stated: "When Assange points out in the context of justifying the title 'Collateral Murder' that the word 'RPG' was not used until after permission to engage was given, he leaves the impression that the soldiers were given the okay to open fire on a group of unarmed men, or men believed to be unarmed. But the video and accompanying audio make clear that the soldiers in the helicopter said they spotted 'weapons' among those in the group—later identified by an internal army investigator as an AK-47 and an RPG." Assange later said "Based upon visual evidence, I suspect there probably were AKs and an RPG, but I'm not sure that means anything". The legal review carried out by the U.S. Army stated that the two children were evacuated to the 28th Combat Support Hospital via Forward Operating Base Loyalty, then transferred to an Iraqi medical facility the next day.

The Guardian stated "It is unclear if some of the men are armed but Noor-Eldeen can be seen with a camera". Glenn Greenwald of Salon.com said that "the vast majority of the men were clearly unarmed". Greenwald called the second airstrike a "plainly unjustified killing of a group of unarmed men carrying away an unarmed, seriously wounded man to safety". The Australian newspaper said the group was displaying "no obvious hostile action".

In The Independent on April 8, 2010, human rights activist Joan Smith wrote that the engagements were like a game to the helicopter crew. She wrote that the co-pilot urged a dying, unarmed journalist to pick up a weapon as he tried to crawl to safety and that "the Apache crew open[ed] fire on civilians". When the crew were informed that a child had been injured by their attack, one initially responded, "Ah damn. Oh well", and a minute later continued, "Well, it's their fault for bringing kids into a battle". Smith describes this reaction as inhuman. She draws parallels with soldiers who suffered post-traumatic stress disorder in earlier wars. She continued, "the wars in Iraq and Afghanistan are inflicting huge psychological damage on combatants". She says that in refusing to recognize this, the US military fails both its own soldiers and their victims. She then concludes that command structures need to be in place to identify "combatants with serious psychological problems".

On Democracy Now!, Josh Stieber, who was at the time assigned to Bravo Company 2–16, said that although it's natural to "judge or criticize the soldiers", in fact "this is how [they] were trained to act". He said that the debate should be re-framed, that it is more appropriate to ask "questions of the larger system" that teaches "doing these things is in the best interests of my own country". In 2009, Stieber left the military as a conscientious objector and became a member of Iraq Veterans Against the War. In a later interview on the World Socialist Web Site, Stieber said that the attack "exposes so clearly the fallacy of using war as a tool of foreign policy or as a way to supposedly spread 'freedom and democracy' around the world".

Ethan McCord, a soldier who arrived on the scene after the attack, stated in an interview for the Australian Broadcasting Corporation:

From being in the perspective of the Apache helicopter crew, I can see where a group of men gathering, when there's a firefight just a few blocks away, which I was involved in, and they're carrying weapons, one of which is an RPG. …Their overall mission that day was to protect us, to provide support for us, so I can see where the initial attack on the group of men was warranted. However, personally I don't feel that the attack on the van was warranted. I think that the people could have been deterred from doing what they were doing in the van by simply firing a few warning shots versus completely obliterating the van and its occupants.

On June 7, 2010, The New Yorker reported that Kristinn Hrafnsson, an investigative reporter who worked on the Collateral Murder video and later became a spokesman for WikiLeaks, said he had found the owner of the building involved in the incident. The owner told him that three families were living in the building and seven residents had died, including his wife and daughter. The report stated that the helicopter crew did not know how many people were in the building when they destroyed it with missiles, and that "there is evidence that unarmed people have both entered and are nearby". It concluded that an investigating officer would want to know how the armed men were identified as combatants from the earlier engagement; would question the nature of the collateral-damage estimate carried out by the crew before the missiles were launched; and would wish to determine whether a missile attack was a proportionate response to the threat.

A Pentagon spokesman said the video did not contradict the official finding that the helicopters' crew acted within the rules of engagement and said that the military's own inquiry backed the assessment that the group of men were carrying a rocket-propelled grenade (RPG).

Assange stated that the attack on the van was the most damning part of the video: "I'm very sceptical that was done under the rules of engagement; and, if it was legal, the rules of engagement must be changed". Fox News reported in 2010 that the rules of engagement in Iraq had not been changed since the incident occurred.

== 2007–2009 coverage ==
On the day of the attack, the U.S. military reported that the two journalists were killed along with nine insurgents, and that the helicopter engagement was related to a U.S. troop raid force that had been attacked by small-arms fire and RPGs. U.S. forces spokesman Lieutenant Colonel Scott Bleichwehl later stated: "There is no question that coalition forces were clearly engaged in combat operations against a hostile force".

The Washington Post reported it was unclear whether the journalists were killed by U.S. fire or by shooting from the targeted Iraqis. Captain James Hall stated they couldn't drive in Bradleys in fear of running over bodies. Major Brent Cummings claimed they took great pains to prevent the loss of innocent civilian lives.

Reuters reported that it could locate no witnesses who had seen gunmen in the immediate area. Reuters also stated that local police described the attack as "random American bombardment". Reuters subsequently asked the U.S. military to probe the deaths. They asked for an explanation of the confiscation of the journalists' two cameras, access to the on-board footage and voice communications from the helicopters involved, and access to the reports of the units involved in the incident, particularly logs of weapons taken from the scene.

On July 25, 2007, during an off-the-record briefing in Baghdad by the U.S. military, two Reuters editors were shown "less than three minutes of video from the Apache's gun camera, up to the exact moment it opened fire the first time." The editors asked to see the remaining footage so Reuters could check whether it had been edited or manipulated. Their request was denied at the briefing and they were told to seek access under the U.S. Freedom of Information Act. Reuters requested a copy of the full video under the Freedom of Information Act (FOIA) on the same day. In a personal statement during her court-martial, Chelsea Manning stated that the military had access to the video, and was actively examining it, yet it told Reuters in response to the FOIA request that the information might no longer exist. The Pentagon eventually blocked the FOIA request despite several follow-up requests by Reuters.

An internal legal review by staff at Forward Operating Base Loyalty in Iraq during July 2007 stated that the helicopters had attacked armed insurgents within the rules of engagement, and that in an apparent case of civilian casualties two reporters working for Reuters had also been killed. The review was not released in full until 2010, after the video of the incident had been released by WikiLeaks.

After the U.S. military concluded that the actions of the soldiers were in accordance with the law of armed conflict and its own "Rules of Engagement", WikiLeaks released the classified Rules of Engagement for 2006, 2007 and 2008, revealing the rules before, during, and after the attacks.

Washington Post reporter David Finkel, who at the time was embedded with Bravo Company 2–16 Infantry, later covered the incidents of the day in his book, The Good Soldiers. At a February 2013 pretrial hearing, Manning stated that Finkel "was quoting, I feel in verbatim, the audio communications of the aerial weapons team crew". She said that she was "aghast" at Finkel's portrayal of the incident. "Reading his account," she explained, "one would believe the engagement was somehow justified as 'payback' for an earlier attack that led to the death of a soldier."

== Coverage from 2010 ==
=== Leaked video footage ===
The footage was released by the nonprofit media organization WikiLeaks during an April 5 press conference at the US National Press Club, and subsequently on a designated website titled Collateral Murder. WikiLeaks stated that the footage shows the "murder of Iraqi civilians and two Reuters journalists". WikiLeaks identified the leak's source as "military whistleblowers". Speaking to Reuters on condition of anonymity, a U.S. Defense official confirmed the authenticity of the leaked audio and video. The military reported that it could not find its copy of the video.

WikiLeaks released a 39-minute version, which shows all three incidents, and a 17-minute version, which shows only the first two incidents. Highlighted in the 17-minute version of the video are Noor-Eldeen with a camera and Chmagh talking on his mobile phone. Both videos depict the attack on the van, van driver, and two other men, and the aftermath when the two seriously injured children were evacuated by U.S. ground forces who arrived on the scene. The longer video shows the third attack, in which Hellfire missiles were fired into a building.

==== Choice of title for the video ====
In an Al Jazeera English interview on April 19, 2010, WikiLeaks' Julian Assange explained why WikiLeaks titled the video Collateral Murder:

And you can see that they also deliberately target Saaed, a wounded man there on the ground, despite their earlier belief that they didn't have the rules of engagement—that the rules of engagement did not permit them to kill Saeed when he was wounded. When he is rescued, suddenly that belief changed. You can see in this particular image he is lying on the ground and the people in the van have been separated, but they still deliberately target him. This is why we called it Collateral Murder. In the first example maybe it's collateral exaggeration or incompetence when they strafe the initial gathering, this is recklessness bordering on murder, but you couldn't say for sure that was murder. But this particular event—this is clearly murder.

Stephen Colbert, in an interview with Assange in April 2010, asked him about the title: "You have edited this tape, and you have given it a title called 'Collateral Murder'. That's not leaking, that's a pure editorial." Assange responded:

The promise we make to our sources is that not only will we defend them through every means that we have available – technologically, legally and politically – but we will try and get the maximum possible political impact for the material that they give to us.

Colbert asked "So 'Collateral Murder' is to get political impact?" Assange responded:

Yes, absolutely... Our promise to the public is that we will release the full source material. So if people have a different opinion, the full material is there for them to analyse and assess.

==== Reactions to the video footage ====
On 19 April 2010, Ethan McCord, who appears on the ground in the video, and Josh Steiber, a member of the same company who was not present on the day, wrote an open Letter of Reconciliation & Responsibility to the Iraqi People apologising for the events in the video. They wrote that:

What was shown in the Wikileaks video only begins to depict the suffering we have created. From our own experiences, and the experiences of other veterans we have talked to, we know that the acts depicted in this video are everyday occurrences of this war: this is the nature of how U.S.-led wars are carried out in this region.

Ahlam Abdelhussein Tuman, the widow of the man who had been driving the van, and the mother of the children McCord had carried out, responded to the open letter in 2010:

I can accept their apology, because they saved my children, and if it were not for them, maybe my two little children would be dead. I would like the American people and the whole world to understand what happened here in Iraq. We lost our country and our lives were destroyed.

Bill Keller of The New York Times wrote, "But in its zeal to make the video a work of antiwar propaganda, WikiLeaks also released a version that didn't call attention to an Iraqi who was toting a rocket-propelled grenade and packaged the manipulated version under the tendentious rubric Collateral Murder." The New York Times wrote that "Critics contend that the shorter video was misleading because it did not make clear that the attacks took place amid clashes in the neighborhood and that one of the men was carrying a rocket-propelled grenade."

Captain Jack Hanzlik, a spokesman for U.S. Central Command stated that the airstrike video "gives you a limited perspective, [it] only tells you a portion of the activity that was happening that day. Just from watching that video, people cannot understand the complex battles that occurred. You are seeing only a very narrow picture of the events". Hanzlik said images gathered during a military investigation of the incident show multiple weapons around the dead bodies in the courtyard, including at least three RPGs. "Our forces were engaged in combat all that day with individuals that fit the description of the men in that video. Their age, their weapons, and the fact that they were within the distance of the forces that had been engaged made it apparent these guys were potentially a threat." He said that WikiLeaks "does not point out that at least one man was carrying an AK-47 assault rifle. He is seen swinging the weapon below his waist while standing next to the man holding the RPG". The WikiLeaks edited video did not add arrows pointing to these men, or label them, as it did with the men carrying cameras. WikiLeaks stated that "some of the men appear to have been armed [although] the behavior of nearly everyone was relaxed" in the introductory text of the shorter video.

In an interview with Fox News Assange said that "it's likely some of the individuals seen in the video were carrying weapons" and "based upon visual evidence I suspect there probably were AKs and an RPG, but I'm not sure that means anything. ... Nearly every Iraqi household has a rifle or an AK. Those guys could have just been protecting their area". Fox News later stated that "although it could be argued AK-47 rifles are common household items, RPGs are not". A draft version of the video WikiLeaks produced made reference to the AK-47s and RPGs, but WikiLeaks said that ultimately they became unsure about the RPG, believing the long object could have been a camera tripod, so they decided not to point it out in the released version. Assange also said "it's ludicrous to allege that we have taken anything out of context in this video".

U.S. Defense Secretary Robert Gates criticized WikiLeaks for releasing the video without providing any context. "These people can put out anything they want, and they're never held accountable for it. There's no before and there's no after". Gates said that the video provides the public with a view of warfare "as seen through a soda straw". Gates stated: "They're in a combat situation. The video doesn't show the broader picture of the firing that was going on at American troops. It's obviously a hard thing to see. It's painful to see, especially when you learn after the fact what was going on. But you—you talked about the fog of war. These people were operating in split second situations.".

The New Yorker praised its release, calling it "a striking artifact—an unmediated representation of the ambiguities and cruelties of modern warfare".

Daniel Ellsberg, a former United States military analyst who was known for having leaked the Pentagon Papers to the media, said of the airstrike:

It would be interesting to have someone speculate or tell us exactly what context would lead to justifying the killing that we see on the screen. As the killing goes on, you obviously would see the killing of men who are lying on the ground in an operation where ground troops are approaching and perfectly capable of taking those people captive, but meanwhile you're murdering before the troops arrive. That's a violation of the laws of war and of course what the mainstream media have omitted from their stories is this context.

=== Subsequent mainstream media coverage ===
Publicity of the incident ballooned following the release of the footage. The event was covered by Al Jazeera English and Reuters, and later by The Washington Post, The New York Times, The Christian Science Monitor, the BBC, and CNN.

Assange stated that some of the press had not reported on the third airstrike, in which three Hellfire missiles were fired onto an apartment complex, which only appears in the longer unedited version of the two videos.

In an interview on NPR on April 6, the day after the Collateral Murder video release, David Finkel said that the Reuters reporters were not embedded with anyone, but working independently. He gave his view of the context of the killings:

the Reuters guys walked into the hottest spot of a very hot morning. There had been running gun battles. There had been a lot of RPG, grenade fire and so on, and they were doing what journalists do. They heard about something, they came to it and they just wanted—from everything I've learned since, they were just there to get that side of the story.

Finkel had reported the day in his book The Good Soldiers, including conversations which closely matched the subsequently leaked video footage. On the same day as the NPR interview, Finkel was asked how he had seen the unedited video and whether WikiLeaks had shown it to him. He responded, "I hadn't heard of WikiLeaks before yesterday. I based the account in my book on multiple sources, all unclassified".

Assange said that Finkel had seen the video and that at least one individual at the offices of The Washington Post had a copy of the video for at least a year, prior to its release by WikiLeaks.

The Washington Post has denied having any copy of the unedited video prior to WikiLeaks release of their edited version, and Finkel (who was on book leave from The Washington Post at the time) said that he has never made any statement about his sources for the story, except that it was "sourced ... from unclassified information and my presence in the area that day".

==== Interviews with Ethan McCord ====
Ethan McCord, the soldier seen in the video carrying the injured boy, recalled in an interview on The Marc Steiner Show that on arrival at the scene, "The first thing I did was run up to the van". After attending to the girl's wounds and handing her to a medic, McCord was ordered to take position on the roof but he returned to the van to find the boy moving his hand. "I grabbed him and ran to the Bradley myself". McCord states he was yelled at for not "pulling security". "The first thing I thought of ... was my children at home". He later sought help for psychological trauma, but was ridiculed by his NCO and told that if he were to go to the mental health officer, "there would be repercussions".

McCord discussed his experience in the battle in an interview with the World Socialist Web Site on April 28, 2010, stating, "What happened then was not an isolated incident. Stuff like that happens on a daily basis in Iraq." McCord also recalled being ordered to "kill every motherfucker on the street" in the event of an attack on their convoy. Describing doubts over his initial enthusiasm in Iraq, McCord said that "I didn't understand why people were throwing rocks at us, why I was being shot at and why we're being blown up, when I have it in my head that I was here to help these people. ... The first real serious doubt, where I could no longer justify to myself being in Iraq or serving in the Army, was on that day in July 2007." In this interview, McCord reports that repercussions for seeking mental health help could include being labeled as a "malingerer", a crime under U.S. military law.

McCord requested mental health assistance following his experiences on July 12, but was told by his superior officers to "get the sand out of [his] vagina" and to "suck it up and be a soldier".

When interviewed by Wired, McCord stated that he supported WikiLeaks in releasing the video, with some qualifications: "When it was first released I don't think it was done in the best manner that it could have been. They were stating that these people had no weapons whatsoever, that they were just carrying cameras. In the video, you can clearly see that they did have weapons ... to the trained eye." McCord added, "I don't say that Wikileaks did a bad thing, because they didn't. ... I think it is good that they're putting this stuff out there. I don't think that people really want to see this, though, because this is war. ... It's very disturbing."

James Spione made a short documentary film about the airstrikes called Incident in New Baghdad, featuring a first-person account from Ethan McCord. It was nominated as a Documentary Short Subject for the 84th Academy Awards.

== Arrest, convictions and sentencing of Manning ==
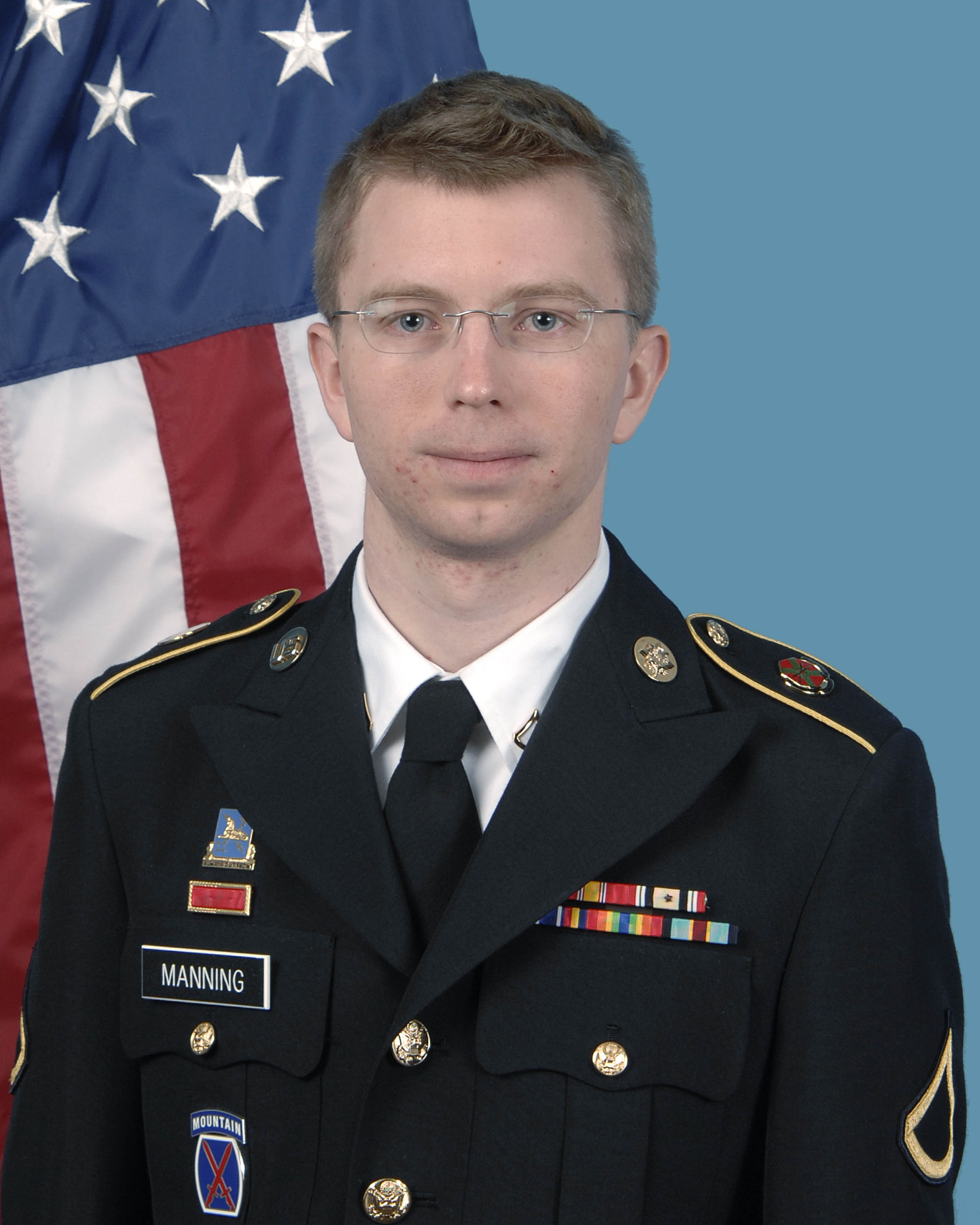
Chelsea Manning (then known as Bradley Manning) in 2012

In May 2010, a 22-year-old American Army intelligence analyst, Chelsea Manning (then known as Bradley Manning), was arrested after telling hacker Adrian Lamo she had leaked the airstrike video, along with a video of the Granai massacre and around 260,000 diplomatic cables, to WikiLeaks. The Internet chats between Manning and Lamo were revealed to the public by Wired.

WikiLeaks said they were unable to confirm whether or not Manning was the source of the video, stating "we never collect personal information on our sources", but saying that "if [Manning is the] whistleblower then, without doubt, [s]he's a national hero" and "we have taken steps to arrange for [her] protection and legal defence".

On February 28, 2013, Manning pleaded guilty to 10 of 22 specified charges. Her trial on the remaining charges began on June 3, 2013. On July 30, Manning was acquitted of the most serious charge, that of aiding the enemy, for giving secrets to WikiLeaks. In addition to five or six espionage counts, she was also found guilty of five theft specifications, two computer fraud specifications and multiple military infractions.

On August 21, 2013, Manning was sentenced to 35 years' imprisonment, reduction in rank from private first class to private, forfeiture of all pay and allowances, and a dishonorable discharge. Pursuant to a commutation by President Obama, Chelsea Manning was released on May 17, 2017.

== Legality of the attacks ==
In a June 7, 2010, article in The New Yorker, Raffi Khatchadourian addressed several issues involved in determining the legality of the attacks, including "proportionality", "positive identification" ("reasonable certainty" that the target has hostile intent), and "the treatment of casualties during an ongoing military operation".

Mark Taylor, an international law expert and a director at the Fafo Institute for International Studies in Norway, told Al Jazeera "there's a case to be made that a war crime may have been committed." He added, "I think what this video shows is really a case that challenges whether the laws of war are strict enough." An article at Gawker stated that Reuters reporter Luke Baker had written an article claiming that the airstrikes may have been war crimes, but Reuters refused to run the story. Reuters responded, "It is absolutely untrue that this story was spiked. It was sent back for more reporting in an effort to incorporate a wider range of experts. The story was then overtaken by a more updated one out of Washington that incorporated reporting from the original piece."

== Military legal review ==
On April 5, 2010, the same day as the release of the video footage by WikiLeaks, the United States Central Command, which oversaw the wars in Iraq and Afghanistan, released a collection of documents including two investigative reports. Pentagon officials told the Reuters news agency that U.S. military lawyers were reviewing the video and could reopen an investigation into the incident, but a spokesperson later said that there were no plans to reopen the investigation.

The report states that at least two members of the group which were first fired on were armed, that two RPGs and one AKM or AK-47 rifle could be seen in the helicopter video, as well as that these weapons were picked up by the follow-up U.S. ground troops. The report concludes that the Reuters employees were in the company of armed insurgents. It also states that "The cameras could easily be mistaken for slung AK-47 or AKM rifles, especially since neither cameraman is wearing anything that identifies him as media or press". The report recommends encouraging journalists in Iraq to wear special vests to identify themselves, as well as to keep the U.S. military updated about their whereabouts. It claimed reporters' "furtive attempts to photograph the Coalition Ground Forces made them appear as hostile combatants".

=== Incident according to the report ===
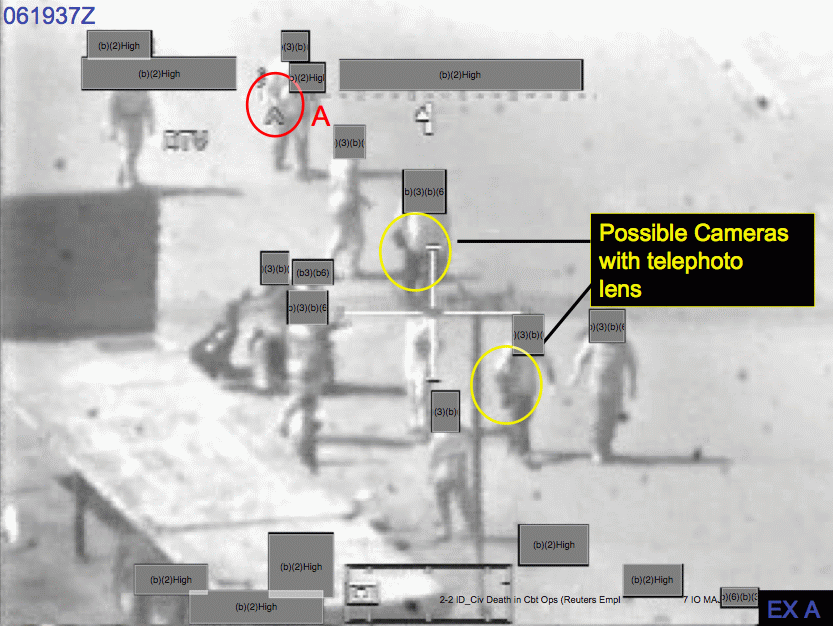
"Cameramen and armed insurgents" (all captions from the Army report)

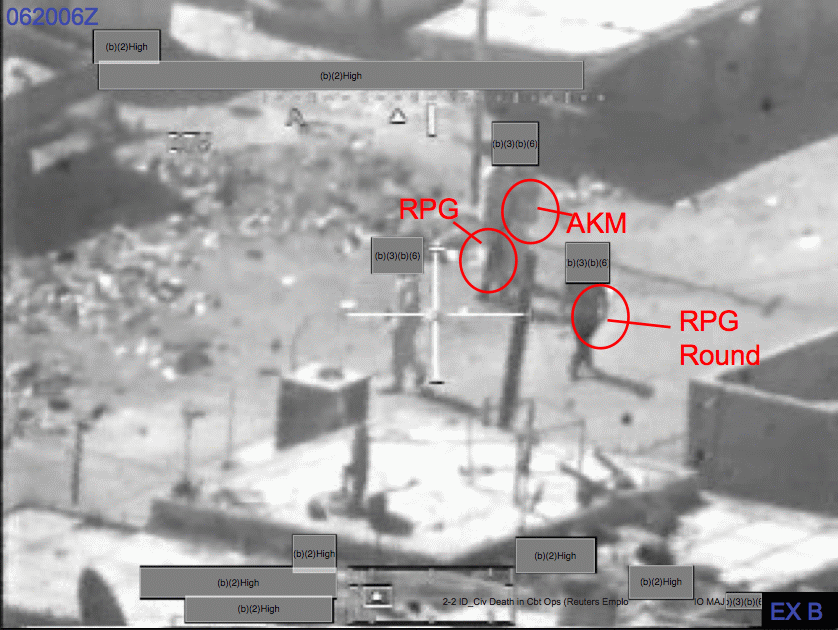
"Insurgents with RPG and AKM weapons"

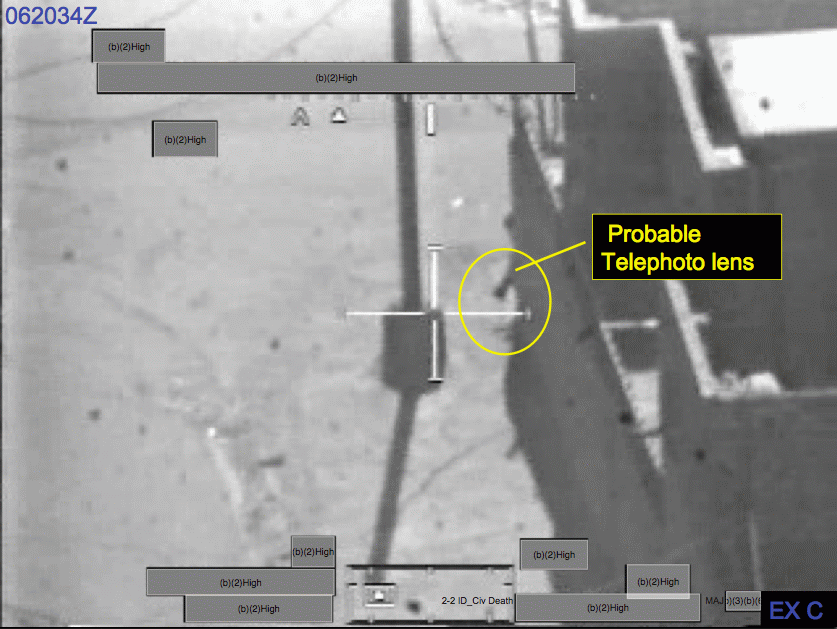
"Cameraman peering around corner of wall"

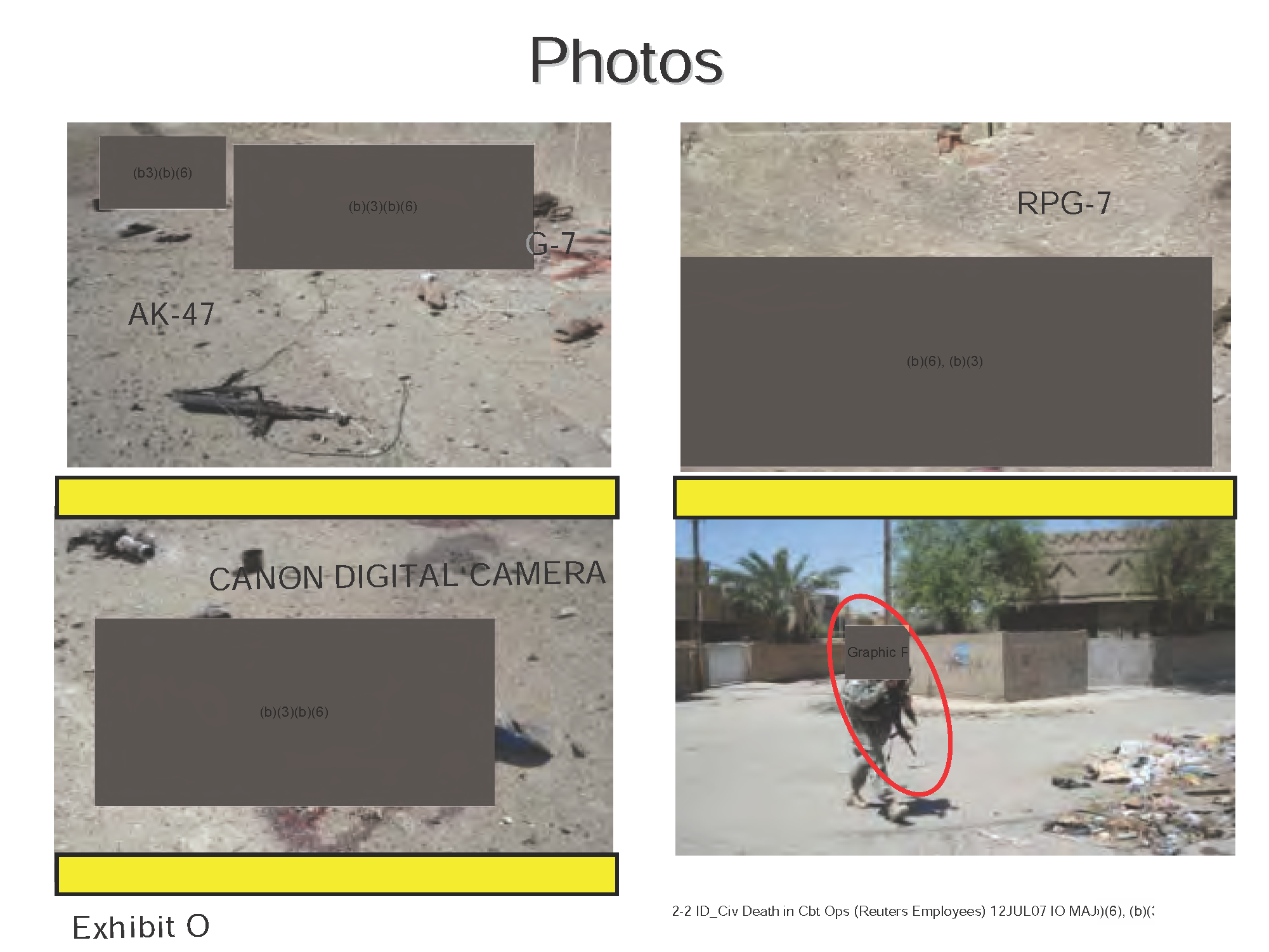
"Pictures taken by ground forces after reaching the site"

==== Attack on personnel and a van per U.S. Army report account ====
According to the U.S. Army investigation report released by the United States Central Command, the engagement started at 10:20 Iraqi local time and ended at 10:41. The report claims that a unit from Bravo Company 2–16 was within 100 meters of the individuals that were fired upon with 30 mm AH-64 Apache cannons. The company was charged with clearing their sector of any small armed forces and had been under fire from small arms and rocket-propelled grenades (RPGs). The company was supported by two Apache helicopters from the 1st Cavalry Division's Aviation Brigade, call signs "Crazyhorse 1/8" and "Crazyhorse 1/9". Two men were identified by Crazyhorse 1/8 as carrying an RPG launcher and an AKM or AK-47.

When the cameraman on the ground aimed his camera in the direction of Bravo Company 2–16, a pilot remarked "He's getting ready to fire". An Apache maneuvered around a building to get a clear field of fire and shot all nine men, killing eight. A passing van then stopped and attempted to load a wounded man. After getting permission to fire, the Apache crew fired on the van. When Bravo Company arrived at the scene, they reported finding two RPGs and an AK-47 or AKM. They also found two Canon EOS digital cameras with telephoto lenses. Two children were found in the van, a four-year-old girl with gunshot wounds and embedded windscreen glass wounds and an eight-year-old boy with multiple wounds, including brain damage arising from shrapnel damage to his right temporal lobe. Both children were said to have been evacuated to the 28th Combat Support Hospital via Forward Operating Base Loyalty, then transferred to an Iraqi medical facility the next day. This account of first bringing the wounded children to the Combat Support Hospital appears to be contradicted by orders by radio that form part of the video record, which forbids it and orders that the children be handed over to local police.

While the Air Weapons Team was providing support at the first engagement area they were informed by ground troops that they were receiving small arms fire from the south/southwest. The crew for Crazyhorse 1/8 then located multiple individuals with weapons about 400 meters east of coalition forces and was given clearance to engage the targets. However, the co-pilot/gunner then observed a child and some other non-combatants in the vicinity of the individuals and decided to hold off on the engagement until the non-combatants were clear. After the non-combatants were clear Crazyhorse 1/8 engaged the targets. The crew for Crazyhorse 1/9 could not engage due to target obfuscation from buildings and dust.

The team observed several individuals from this group, some possibly wounded, run into a large multistory building. The co-pilot/gunner for Crazyhorse 1/9 spotted three individuals near this building get into a red SUV and drive away to the west. For about 5 to 10 minutes the team diverted its attention to this vehicle. However, according to the co-pilot for Crazyhorse 1/8 they failed to positively identify the occupants as combatants and returned to the previous engagement area.

==== Attack on building per U.S. Army report account ====
The events between the attack on the van and the attack on the building (approximately 30 minutes) were not captured on the leaked video footage. The military did not include the attack on the building in their report.

==== Julian Assange's comments regarding U.S. Army report ====
Assange responded to the investigation report released by the Army in an interview with Democracy Now!, stating that "the tone and language is all about trying to find an excuse for the activity. ... It's very clear that this is the approach, to try and find any mechanism to excuse the behavior, and that is what ended up happening."

== Awards ==
In May 2011, the Barcelona Human Rights Film Festival awarded the investigative film Collateral murder, Hellfire, done by Kristinn Hrafnsson, WikiLeaks spokesperson, and Ingi Ingason, with the award for International Journalism and Human Rights.

In June 2011, the Federation of German Scientists (VDW) awarded the "Whistleblower Award" to the person who made the video Collateral Murder public via WikiLeaks.

== Media representations ==
- The War You Don't See, a 2010 feature-length documentary film directed and presented by Australian journalist John Pilger, opens with the WikiLeaks footage of the attack.
- British musician M.I.A. used the WikiLeaks footage of the attack in visualisers for her 2010 mixtape Vicki Leekx, which were posted to her YouTube account in February 2011.
- Incident in New Baghdad, a 2011 Oscar-nominated short documentary film about the Baghdad airstrike.
- We Steal Secrets: The Story of WikiLeaks, a 2013 feature-length documentary film directed by Alex Gibney, includes the WikiLeaks footage of the attack.
- Documentary: Permission to Engage: "Collateral Murder" through the eyes of victims' families.
- Interview with Ethan McCord
- Representation (including audio) by Banksy, October 9, 2013. Part of Banksy's Better Out Than In month-long artwork series on the streets of New York City.
- The Source, a 2014 oratorio by Ted Hearne, included footage of the airstrike, as well as the faces of people reacting to it.
- Risk, a 2016 documentary on WikiLeaks founder Julian Assange, included the footage in its discussion
- Line in the Sand, a 2023 book by Reuters bureau chief Dean Yates about his struggles with post-traumatic stress disorder after his staff were killed in the attack.

== See also ==
- United States war crimes
