= Thank You for Your Service =

Thank Your for Your Service may refer to:

- Thank You for Your Service (book), 2013 non-fiction book
- Thank You for Your Service (2015 film), American documentary
- Thank You for Your Service (2017 film), American biographical war drama based on the book
- We Got It from Here... Thank You 4 Your Service, 2016 album by American hip hop group A Tribe Called Quest
- "Thank You for Your Service" (American Horror Story), an episode of the eleventh season of American Horror Story
