= Site 41 =

Site 41 could refer to:

- Plesetsk Cosmodrome Site 41, a rocket laund pad in Russia.
- The North Simcoe Landfill, a proposed landfill site in Ontario, Canada that was cancelled after considerable public opposition.
