= Thank You for Your Service (2017 film) =

2017 film by Jason Hall

- Theatrical release poster
- Directed by: Jason Hall
- Screenplay by: Jason Hall
- Based on: Thank You for Your Service by David Finkel
- Produced by: Jon Kilik
- Starring: Miles Teller; Haley Bennett; Joe Cole; Amy Schumer; Beulah Koale; Scott Haze
- Cinematography: Roman Vasyanov
- Edited by: Jay Cassidy; Dino Jonsäter
- Music by: Thomas Newman
- Production companies: DreamWorks Pictures; Reliance Entertainment; Rahway Road Productions
- Distributed by: Universal Pictures
- Release dates: October 15, 2017 (Heartland); October 27, 2017 (United States)
- Running time: 108 minutes
- Country: United States
- Language: English
- Budget: $20 million
- Box office: $10 million

Thank You for Your Service is a 2017 American biographical war drama film written and directed by Jason Hall, in his directorial debut, and based on the 2013 non-fiction book of the same name by David Finkel. Finkel, a Washington Post reporter, wrote about veterans of the 2nd Battalion, 16th Infantry Regiment returning to the vicinity of Fort Riley, Kansas, following a 15-month deployment in Iraq in 2007. The film is about posttraumatic stress disorder (PTSD), depicting U.S. soldiers who try to adjust to civilian life, and stars Miles Teller, Haley Bennett, Beulah Koale, Amy Schumer, and Scott Haze. Bruce Springsteen wrote the song "Freedom Cadence" specifically for the closing credits.

The film had its world premiere at the Heartland Film Festival on October 15, 2017, and was theatrically released in the United States on October 27, 2017, by Universal Pictures. It received generally positive reviews, with praise for Teller's performance, but grossed just $10 million against its $20 million budget.

== Plot ==
After a harrowing 15-month combat tour in Iraq, the much-decorated Adam Schumann returns home to Kansas and a loving wife, Saskia. Adam and Saskia have two young children, a daughter and an infant son born while Adam was still overseas. Adam has PTSD as manifested by nightmares and frequent flashbacks for which his wife convinces him to seek help from an overburdened Department of Veterans Affairs. He also receives solace from two Iraq buddies living nearby, an American Samoan, Solo Aieti, and Billy Waller, who commits suicide in front of his fiancée after discovering she has taken all of his money and their child and left him.

Adam's unresolved psychological issues revolve around his failure to safely rescue a fellow soldier from a building under fire (Michael Emory, who was dropped on his head and rendered hemiplegic but later expresses gratitude to Adam for being alive) and survivor's guilt about letting Sergeant First Class James Doster take Adam's place on patrol one day. With Doster filling in for Adam, the Humvee made a wrong turn and hit an improvised explosive device. Solo assisted the men in their escape to safety, but Doster was inadvertently left behind and died in the conflagration. Doster's grieving widow, Amanda, who is friends with Saskia Schumann, finally gains closure as she learns the circumstances of her husband's death towards the end of the movie and absolves Adam and Solo of responsibility for it.

Meanwhile, Solo has such severe PTSD and memory loss that he is unable to fulfill a fervent desire to reenlist for another tour in Iraq. He falls in with a group of drug dealers led by a Gulf War veteran, Dante. Adam rescues his friend and puts him on a Greyhound bus to California, where Solo will take Adam's reserved place at a rehabilitation center specializing in the treatment of PTSD.

Sometime later, Adam returns from his own stay at the rehabilitation center, being greeted by his wife and children back in their original home.

== Cast ==
- Miles Teller as Staff Sergeant Adam Schumann, Saskia's husband, a soldier who leaves Iraq as a broken man.
- Haley Bennett as Saskia Schumann, Adam's loyal and supportive wife.
- Beulah Koale as Specialist Tausolo Aieti, Alea's husband, an American Samoan soldier who feels that the military has made his life better.
- Joe Cole as Private First Class Billy Waller, a soldier who returns home in crisis and tries to find his fiancée and their daughter, who have left him.
- Amy Schumer as Amanda Doster, Saskia's friend and the wife of Sergeant First Class James Doster.
- Brad Beyer as Sergeant First Class James Doster, Amanda's husband.
- Keisha Castle-Hughes as Alea, Tausolo Aieti's wife.
- Scott Haze as Michael Emory, a soldier suffering from PTSD.
- Omar Dorsey as Dante, a veteran who now operates as a drug smuggler.
- Jayson Warner Smith as VA Receptionist
- Sean P Mcgoldrick as Private Chris Kyle Jr.
- Erin Darke as Tracey, fiancée of Billy.
- David Morse as Fred Gusman
- Jake Weber as Colonel Plymouth
- Kate Lyn Sheil as Bell

== Production ==
On March 12, 2013, DreamWorks announced that it had acquired the film rights to David Finkel's then-upcoming non-fiction book Thank You for Your Service, about posttraumatic stress disorder (PTSD) in soldiers who return from the war in Iraq and have difficulties in adapting to civilian life. Steven Spielberg was expected to direct the film, and, in June 2013, American Sniper screenwriter Jason Dean Hall was hired to adapt the book into a film. Daniel Day-Lewis was later eyed to re-team with Spielberg on the film.

On June 30, 2015, The Hollywood Reporter confirmed that Hall would instead be making his directorial debut with the film from his own script. Jon Kilik produced the film, which Universal Pictures distributes in the United States.

On August 19, 2015, it was reported that Miles Teller was in talks to join the film as Adam Schumann, a soldier who leaves Iraq as a broken man. On October 20, 2015, Haley Bennett was cast to play Schumann's loyal and supportive wife. On December 2, 2015, New Zealand-based newcomer Beulah Koale was cast to play Solo, an American Samoan soldier who feels that the military has made his life better. On January 7, 2016, Scott Haze was added to play a soldier suffering from PTSD. On January 28, 2016, Joe Cole joined the film to play a soldier who returns home in crisis and tries to find his fiancée and their daughter who have left him, while Jayson Warner Smith joined the film to play a receptionist at a Veterans Affairs office. On February 9, 2016, Amy Schumer joined the cast with three others, Keisha Castle-Hughes, Brad Beyer, and Omar Dorsey. It was later revealed that Kate Lyn Sheil had also joined the cast.

=== Filming ===
Principal photography on the film began on February 9, 2016, in Atlanta, Georgia. In March 2016, it filmed at the Gwinnett Place Mall in Duluth, Georgia.

== Release ==
The film had its world premiere at the Heartland Film Festival on October 15, 2017, and was theatrically released in the United States on October 27, 2017. The film was later made available for community-organized screenings through Gathr’s event-based booking service.

=== Home media ===
Thank You for Your Service was released on Digital on January 9, 2018, and on Blu-ray and DVD on January 23, 2018, By Universal Pictures Home Entertainment.

=== Promotion ===
On October 20, 2017, Universal and DreamWorks announced a partnership with AMC Theatres to give more than 10,000 free tickets to the film to veterans and service members.

== Reception ==
=== Box office ===
In the United States and Canada, Thank You for Your Service was released alongside Jigsaw and Suburbicon, and was projected to gross around $5 million from 2,054 theaters in its opening weekend. It ended up debuting to $3.7 million, finishing 6th at the box office, and marking the second straight week Teller was featured in a well-received but underperforming biopic, following Only the Brave. In its second weekend it grossed $2.3 million, dropping 40%, and finishing 7th at the box office.

=== Critical response ===
On review aggregator Rotten Tomatoes, the film has an approval rating of 77% based on 113 reviews, with an average rating of 6.69/10. The site's critical consensus reads, "Thank You for Your Service takes a sobering and powerfully acted – if necessarily incomplete – look at soldiers grappling with the horrific emotional impact of war." On Metacritic, the film has a weighted average score of 68 out of 100, based on 34 critics, indicating "generally favorable reviews". Audiences polled by CinemaScore gave the film an average grade of "A−" on an A+ to F scale.

Matt Zoller Seitz of RogerEbert.com gave the film 3.5/4 stars, stating that, although a studio picture:

...has been written, shot, edited and acted in such an intimate and unobtrusive way that the result feels like a throwback to an earlier era of American mainstream filmmaking, when it was still possible to base a handsomely produced feature film around observed behavior.
