= Terence Corcoran =

Canadian journalist

Terence Dollard Corcoran
- Born: November 6, 1942 (age 83); Montreal, Quebec
- Education: Carleton University
- Occupations: editor, columnist

Terence "Terry" Dollard Corcoran (born November 6, 1942) is columnist and comment editor for the Financial Post section of the Toronto-based National Post.

== Biography and works ==
Born in Montreal, Quebec, Corcoran received a Bachelor of Journalism degree from Carleton University in 1969. After working for the Toronto Star in 1969, he joined the Ottawa Journal where he worked until 1971. From 1972 to 1974, he was a reporter and business editor for The Canadian Press. In 1974, he joined the Montreal Gazette where he worked as a business writer (1974–1976) and financial editor (1976–1978).

After traveling in Asia, he became associated editor of the Financial Times of Canada in 1978. He was appointed managing editor in 1980, executive editor in 1983, and was editor from 1984 to 1987. From 1987 to 1989, he was Associated Editor of the Financial Post. From 1989 to 1998, he was a business columnist for The Globe and Mail. From 1998 to 2000, he was hired by Conrad Black as an editor for the Financial Post.

In 1983, he was awarded the National Business Writing Award for Excellence in Editorial Writing and for Business Reporting and Writing in 1976. With Laura Reid, he co-authored the 1984 book Public money, private greed: the Greymac, Seaway, and Crown Trusts affair (Collins, ISBN 0-00-217376-X).

Corcoran is featured in the 2010 Canadian documentary film Water On The Table, where he debates water rights issues.

== Alleged defamation of Andrew Weaver ==
On February 6, 2015, Corcoran, along with three other columnists of the National Post, the former Publisher, Gordon Fisher, and the National Post itself were found by B.C. Supreme Court Judge Emily Burke to have defamed B.C. M.L.A. Andrew Weaver in several columns authored in 2009 by implying he was "untrustworthy, unscientific and incompetent". Weaver was awarded $50,000 by the Court. The judge also "ordered the Post to remove the articles from its electronic databases, withdraw any consent given to third parties to re-publish the columns, and publish a full retraction online." The National Post appealed the ruling. It was overturned in 2017 on the basis that the original trial judge was in error having taken a "combined approach" to the four articles by three different authors, noting that "there was no case made at the trial of a conspiracy or concerted action by the authors". And again overturned in 2020. A new trial date is to be set.

== Politics ==
Charlie Smith, writing an opinion piece in the political blog for The Georgia Straight, states that Corcoran takes a libertarian viewpoint. He was characterised as a "conservative commentator" in Maclean's.
