= We Steal Secrets: The Story of WikiLeaks =

- Theatrical release poster
- Directed by: Alex Gibney
- Written by: Alex Gibney
- Produced by: Alex Gibney; Marc Shmuger; Alexis Bloom
- Starring: Julian Assange; Heather Brooke
- Cinematography: Maryse Alberti
- Edited by: Andy Grieve
- Music by: Will Bates
- Production companies: Jigsaw Productions; Global Produce
- Distributed by: Focus World
- Release date: January 21, 2013 (Sundance)
- Running time: 130 minutes
- Country: United States
- Language: English
- Box office: $457,517

We Steal Secrets: The Story of WikiLeaks is a 2013 American independent documentary film about the organization established by Julian Assange, and people involved in the collection and distribution of secret information and media by whistleblowers. Directed by Alex Gibney, it covers a period of several decades, and includes background material. Gibney received his fifth nomination for Best Documentary Screenplay from the Writers Guild of America Awards for this film.

== Synopsis ==
The 1989 WANK worm attack on NASA computers, which occurred on the week the Galileo spacecraft was launched, is depicted in the film as the work of Australian hackers, including Assange. The founding of Wikileaks in 2006 is followed by coverage of several key events: its 2009–2010 leaks about the Icelandic financial collapse, Swiss banking tax evasion, Kenyan government corruption, toxic-waste dumping, Chelsea Manning's communications with Adrian Lamo, the release by Wikileaks of the Collateral Murder video, the Iraq War documents, the Afghanistan War documents, US diplomatic cables, Lamo's exposure of Manning to the FBI and the accusations of sexual assault made against Assange. Interview subjects include Julian Assange, Heather Brooke, James Ball, Donald Bostom, Nick Davies, Mark Davis, Jason Edwards, Timothy Douglas Webster, Michael Hayden, Adrian Lamo, J. William Leonard, Gavin MacFadyen, Smári McCarthy, Iain Overton, Kevin Poulsen and Vaughan Smith.

== Production ==
Assange did not participate in the production, so previously recorded interviews were used. Manning was also unavailable. John Young and Deborah Natsios contributed contacts and research material, but declined to be interviewed for the film upon learning it was tentatively titled "Unnamed Wikileaks Project". About 35 minutes of chat animations, headline effects, and other visual effects were designed and rendered by Framestore in New York.

WikiLeaks published a transcript of the film, annotated with comments by WikiLeaks, which it said were corrections. Director Gibney responded that the transcript released by Wikileaks was incomplete, lacked Private Manning's words, and was from an unreleased, incomplete version of the film. Later, Gibney published his own annotated version of the WikiLeaks transcript, responding to the criticisms made by Wikileaks. One of the points mentioned by Wikileaks in its annotated transcript was the possible existence of a sealed US indictment against Assange. Associate Producer Javier Botero said, "The sealed indictment has been a huge part of Assange's arguments about an American-Swedish conspiracy. He also brings it up at several points in his annotations as key evidence for why our film is wrong. But the whole thing is just based on one boastful line in a 2011 leaked email from an ex-government official; no other evidence has ever come out."

According to the film's executive producer Jemima Khan, We Steal Secrets was "denounced before seeing" by Assange, who tweeted "an unethical and biased title in the context of pending criminal trials. It is the prosecution's claim and it is false". Khan said that Assange told her, "If it’s a fair film, it will be pro-Julian Assange." Khan asserted the title was based on a quote in the film "from Michael Hayden, a former director of the CIA, who told Gibney that the US government was in the business of 'stealing secrets' from other countries".

== Release ==
The film previewed in December 2012, and debuted January 21, 2013 at the Sundance Film Festival. It was scheduled to be released May 24, 2013 in New York and Los Angeles, and widely in June. In October 2021, Netflix began streaming the film.

== Reception ==
=== Critical response ===
On Rotten Tomatoes, the film has a 91% rating based on 79 reviews with an average rating of 7.9/10. The site's critical consensus reads "As fascinating as it is provocative, We Steal Secrets: The Story of Wikileaks presents another documentary triumph for director Alex Gibney, as well as a troubling look at one of the more meaningful issues of our time".

The Hollywood Reporter writer David Rooney found the film to be a "tremendously fascinating story told with probing insight and complexity". David Edelstein of New York magazine wrote that the film is a "twisty, probing, altogether enthralling movie," adding that it is "a documentary with the overflowing texture of fiction." Steven Rea of The Philadelphia Inquirer, who calls the film "riveting and revelatory," notes that the director "lines up an A-list of experts, observers, cohorts, and adversaries, tracing how Assange's and Manning's worlds collide - virtually, and violently - and how a noble quest for transparency and truth turned into a tale of conspiracy and paranoia."

Conversely, The Guardian's Jeremy Kay gave the film 3/5 stars and wrote that "[i]t's probably too soon for a meaningful perspective on the WikiLeaks saga", and Variety's Peter Debruge found the film "dramatically lacking" a central core conflict, especially when compared with Gibney's previous work, and ultimately found Manning's story the most compelling part of the film.

Robert Manne, who was interviewed in the film and had a written debate with Gibney based on his review, expressed in The Monthly that he felt it was a "superficially impressive but ultimately myopic film". In a review for Truthdig, journalist Chris Hedges called the film "agitprop for the security and surveillance state," adding that it "dutifully peddles the state's contention that WikiLeaks is not a legitimate publisher and that Chelsea Manning, who passed half a million classified Pentagon and State Department documents to WikiLeaks, is not a legitimate whistle-blower." However, Salon reporter Andrew O'Hehir claimed that many of Hedges's statements about the film are patently false and that his "alarming accusations and peculiar misreadings of the film" are "an attempt to attack Gibney's integrity and sabotage his reputation".

=== Wikileaks reaction ===
Wikileaks criticised the film for containing dozens of factual errors and instances of "sleight of hand". It also criticised the film's depiction of Chelsea Manning's decision to leak US military and diplomatic documents as "a failure of character, rather than a triumph of conscience".

=== Accolades ===
We Steal Secrets was nominated for the 2013 International Documentary Association ABC News Videosource Award, but lost to Trials of Mohammed Ali.

== See also ==
- The Fifth Estate, a 2013 film starring Benedict Cumberbatch as Assange.
- Mediastan, a 2013 documentary film about the 2010 United States diplomatic cables leak, produced by Julian Assange, Rebecca O'Brien and Lauren Dark
- Citizenfour, a 2014 documentary film by Laura Poitras about whistleblower Edward Snowden.
