= Al-Amin al-Thaniyah =

Coordinates: 33.313802°N 44.501104°E

Al-Amin al-Thaniyah is a neighborhood in New Baghdad, a district on the east side of Baghdad.

It was named after the Caliph al-Amin. In 2003, Shiites renamed it to "Al-Murthadha District", after Ali Murthadha, the first Shiite imam.

The controversial airstrikes on July 12, 2007, by a US army attack helicopter, which killed a number of civilians, among them two Reuters news staff, took place here.

== Variant transliterations into English ==
- "al-Amin"/"Amin"/"Ameen"
- "Thanniyah" can also be spelled "Thania" or "Thanya".
