= North Simcoe landfill (Site 41) =

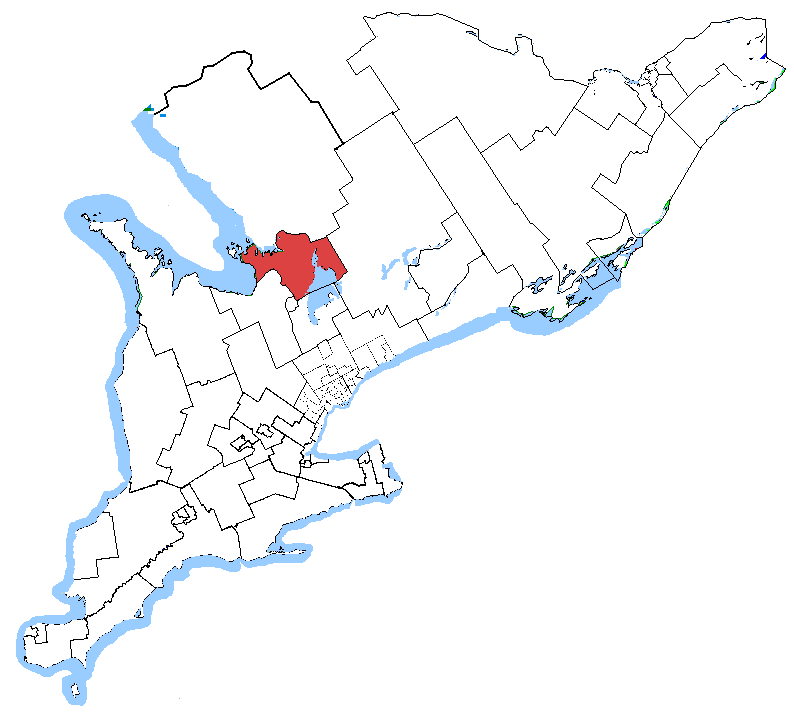
The electoral riding of Simcoe North in southern Ontario.

North Simcoe landfill (Site 41) was a planned 20.7 hectare (50 acre) landfill site for municipal waste in northern Simcoe County, 40 kilometres northwest of Barrie, Ontario. The site would have received waste from municipalities of Midland, Penetanguishene, Tiny and Tay. The site was slated to begin operation in the fall of 2009, however, Simcoe County Council voted in September 2009 to shelve the project after a massive public protest.

County officials claimed the site would use a combination of natural and engineered features to provide containment and protection for the natural environment. Opponents say it was too large of a threat to local groundwater.

== Background ==
Plans for Site 41 were established to provide the four north Simcoe County with municipalities of Midland, Penetanguishene, Tiny and Tay with a local waste disposal site. These municipalities, along with Port McNicoll and Victoria Harbour, had been using a site known as the Pauze landfill since 1966. Hydrogeological surveys of the Pauze landfill in 1982 and 1983 revealed a leachate plume migrating towards Nottawasaga Bay, and evidence of the illegal dumping of liquid industrial waste. Consequently, the landfill was closed in October 1987, and a new water system would have to be constructed for the impacted residents of Perkinsfield.

There are estimates that there is less than 10 years left of waste disposal capacity for North Simcoe, a capacity that was shortened by the diversion of waste originally intended for the Pauze landfill to others in the county, causing the premature closure of one of them. From 1995-2008 Simcoe County hauled more than 200,400 tonnes of waste from the four North Simcoe municipalities to sites elsewhere in the county at an estimated cost of $7.25 million. Throughout the process the County considered alternatives and stepped up its efforts to divert waste from landfill. Since 2003 diversion of curbside waste has tripled and by the end of 2009 the County will have reached a diversion rate of 60 per cent overall.

== Approvals ==
The site had to pass many Ministry of the Environment approvals associated with opening the waste site, including the Environmental Assessment Act, the Environmental Protection Act, Design and Operations Plan approval, Certificate of Approval and a Permit to Take Water. In total, the process has taken 30 years.

In 1989, an Environmental Assessment Board rejected an application for Site 41. The board was highly critical of the methodology that went into selecting potential sites for landfilling, including issues of considering the hydrogeologic acceptability of sites, prioritizing other considerations such as lot size and ownership, narrowing its search options, and not having a clear and 'traceable' process that led to the selection of Site 41. While the board accepted evidence that Site 41 would be hydrogeologically suitable, it would be the flawed methodology of site selection that led it to its ruling. The county challenged the decision by going to the Lieutenant Governor in Council regarding the decision, where the hearing was adjourned in order to allow the county to produce more evidence of investigating other alternative sites.

Resuming hearings on Site 41 was challenged by a group known as Wye Citizens' Group and the Township of Tiny. The site received Environmental Assessment Act and Environmental Protection Act approvals in 1995.

== Construction ==
Construction of the site was supposed to be implemented in six phases, with each phase anticipated to last between four and eight years. As clay is excavated, groundwater located in a sand layer of soil directly below the clay will be pumped out to prevent upward water pressure from causing breaks in the clay base. Pumping, if required, was estimated to last only three to six months during the construction of each phase and would cease once sufficient ballast is in place. The first phase was supposed to be operational in the fall of 2009.

=== Natural Protective Features ===
Simcoe County claims a "hydraulic trap" or upward hydraulic gradient means that groundwater at the site is under upward pressure and will not allow potential contaminants to enter. A layer of clay which ranges from 3.6 to 12 metres in depth restricts upward water flow to 11 millimetres per year.

=== Engineered Protective Features ===
Construction of the landfill cells includes:

- a high-density polyethylene liner that is supposed to prevent leachate from leaving the site. The liner serves a second function in preventing the entry of water under upward pressure.
- A collection system will continuously divert leachate for treatment at an off-site waste water facility.
  - The system consists of a filter layer of
  - stone,
  - a porous geotextile separator layer,
  - a 500-millimetre layer of 50-millimetre drainage gravel,
  - perforated high-density polyethylene drainage pipe at 30-metre intervals, and
  - a geotextile cushion layer against the liner.

If the site opens, a system of groundwater wells is supposed to be monitored to confirm the protective features functioning as designed.

== Controversy ==
The proposed location is above the Alliston aquifer. The aquifer stretches from Georgian Bay to the Oak Ridges Moraine, and allegedly has some of the purest water on earth, however the county states that these results are from a limited sample, and groundwater at the site sometimes does not meet Ontario Drinking Water Standards. Much public opposition stemmed from the fact the site is located on the aquifer, and from the general distrust of municipal servants after the Pauze landfill incident. In addition, the municipality of Tiny withdrew from the North Simcoe Waste Management Association (NSWMA) in 1986 due to a perceived lack of concern over Tiny's agricultural land, and the NSWMA's handling of the environmental assessment.

A group of local citizens, including a deputation of aboriginal women, started a protest movement against the landfill plans and camped at the site to prevent construction. Simcoe County responded by having more than a dozen protesters charged with mischief. Opposition to the site also included former US presidential candidate Ralph Nader, Council of Canadians president Maude Barlow and Canadian environmentalist David Suzuki. The protests were captured in the 2010 Canadian documentary film Water On The Table.

The County has invested $10 million in costs for land acquisition, consulting fees, site development, and legal and consulting fees for challenges by opponents to the site.

== Discontinuing development and future plans ==
In August 2009, Simcoe County voted to put a one-year moratorium on the development of Site 41.

On September 22, 2009, Simcoe county council voted to permanently discontinue any plans for the site. The county states that it only has a seven-year capacity left for waste without Site 41, so a consulting firm is now examining a new waste management plan.

There were also lingering concerns over the fact that the Certificate of Approval for the site had not been revoked. The county has not ruled out using the site for other waste management purposes, such as for recycling.

On May 26, 2010 the operating certificate was revoked by the province, protecting the property from ever being used for waste disposal again.

The community effort to stop the Site 41 landfill is cited as a standard by which opposition was mounted against the Highland Companies mega quarry north of Toronto.
