= Water on the Table =

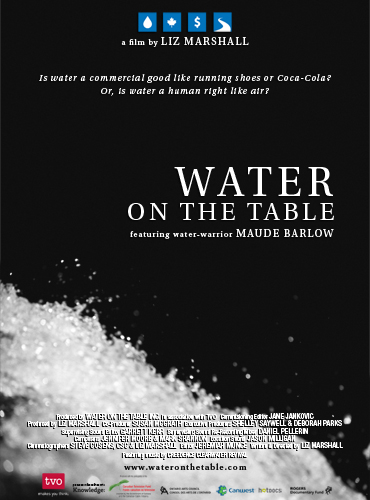
- Written by: Liz Marshall
- Directed by: Liz Marshall
- Starring: Maude Barlow
- Theme music composer: Jennifer Moore, Mark Shannon
- Country of origin: Canada
- Original language: English

Production
- Producers: Liz Marshall, Susan McGrath
- Cinematography: Steve Cosens CSC, Liz Marshall
- Editor: Jeremiah Munce

Original release
- Release: March 24, 2010

Water on the Table is a Canadian documentary film directed, produced and written by filmmaker Liz Marshall. The film explores Canada's relationship to its freshwater resources and features Canadian activist Maude Barlow in her pursuit to protect water from privatization. Counterbalancing Barlow's views are those of policy and economic experts who assert that water is a resource and a commodity like any other.

== Summary ==
Water on the Table follows Barlow over the course of a year, from 2008 to 2009, as she serves as the United Nations Senior Advisor on Water to Father Miguel d'Escoto Brockmann, the President of the United Nations General Assembly for its 63rd session. During that period, the film also captures Barlow's involvement in the North Simcoe Landfill (Site 41) case, which takes place near the town of Barrie, Ontario. The pristine Alliston aquifer was threatened by county council plans to build a landfill site on top of it. The film also follows Barlow on a fact-finding excursion to Fort McMurray, Alberta to learn about the effects of oil sands operations on water sources such as the Athabasca River and its impact on First Nations communities, namely the Dene and Cree peoples of Fort Chipewyan.

Barlow's contention that water "must be declared a public trust" has its basis in her involvement with water rights issues going back to the Canada-US Free Trade Agreement in the 1980s, when water was under consideration as a tradable good under the terms of that agreement. She continued to be involved in the issue when water was carried over for consideration as both a tradable good and an investment source in the subsequent North American Free Trade Agreement (NAFTA). She continues to be involved in the issue in her capacity as the national chair of the Council of Canadians. She has also written numerous books on a range of social and political issues, most recently Blue Covenant: The Global Water Crisis and The Coming Battle for the Right to Water.

Barlow's contention is debated in Water on the Table by the dissenting voices of policy and economic experts, including:

- Terence Corcoran, editor of the Financial Post and long-time journalist writing on economic and business policy issues
- Marcel Boyer, senior economist with the Montreal Economic Institute
- Elizabeth Brubaker, executive director of Environment Probe and a member of Canada's National Round Table on the Environment and the Economy
- Robert Pastor, international affairs expert, former U.S. presidential advisor, Vice President of International Affairs and Professor of International Relations at American University, and founder of the Center for North American Studies, which focuses on the aim of understanding and building a North American Community, and
- Erik R. Peterson, senior advisor with the Center for Strategic and International Studies (CSIS) think tank in Washington, D.C. and director with the A.T. Kearney Global Business Policy Council.

Water on the Table rounds out the water conflict debates with moments of cinematic tribute to water. The film features images of watersheds, wetlands, rivers, estuaries, waterfalls and lakes by Canadian cinematographer Steve Cosens.

The broadcast hour version of Water On The Table premiered March 24, 2010 on TVO's documentary series The View From Here.

== Awards and distinctions ==
- Honourable Mention, Canada's Environmental Media Association Awards, 2011
- Featured Canadian Film for Cinema Politica, 2011
- Best Canadian Feature award, Planet in Focus Environmental Film Festival 2010
- Donald Brittain Award for Best Social Political Documentary, Gemini Award nomination, 2010

== See also ==
- Flow: For Love of Water, a 2008 documentary on water privatization
- Waterlife
