= Sam Bozzo =

American film director and author

Samuel Bozzo
- Born: February 15, 1969 (age 56)

Sam Bozzo (born February 15, 1969) is an American film director and author.

== Overview ==
Bozzo wrote, directed, and edited three short films. For Which It Stands (1990) was screened in the Sundance Film Festival. The Shadowed Cry (1992) was created as a Top 10 Director assignment for Project Greenlight, run by Matt Damon and Ben Affleck. Holiday on the Moon (1994) won the TriggerStreet.com Short Film competition held at the Toronto International Film Festival, has been screened on the Sundance Channel. Bozzo won a 1994 CINE award for the film.

Bozzo has finished two feature documentaries, one on hackers (Hackers Wanted) and the other Blue Gold: World Water Wars, inspired by the book by Maude Barlow and Tony Clarke.

== Films ==
- For Which It Stands (1990)
- Shadowed Cry (1992)
- Holiday on the Moon (1994)
- Hackers Wanted
- Blue Gold: World Water Wars
