= Hackers Wanted =

- Directed by: Sam Bozzo
- Written by: Sam Bozzo
- Produced by: Dana Brunetti; Kevin Spacey
- Starring: Adrian Lamo; Steve Wozniak; Leo Laporte; Kevin Rose; Marcus Ranum; John Draper; John Arquilla; Kevin Lee Poulsen
- Narrated by: Kevin Spacey
- Cinematography: Dan Park
- Edited by: Sam Bozzo
- Distributed by: Trigger Street Productions
- Running time: 87 minutes
- Country: United States
- Language: English

Hackers Wanted is an unreleased American documentary film.

Directed and written by Sam Bozzo, the film explores the origins and nature of hackers and hacking by following the adventures of Adrian Lamo, and contrasting his story with that of controversial figures throughout history. The film is narrated by Kevin Spacey.

Originally named "Can You Hack It?" in 2007, the film failed to get a conventional release, according to Lamo, because of conflicts between its producer and others on the team. The more commonly cited reason is a problem with the quality of the finished product. On May 20, 2010, a version of the film was leaked to BitTorrent. Lamo has stated that he had no involvement in the leak.

It's ironic that a film about overcoming barriers, about new technologies, about thinking differently, had to come to the public eye by being hacked out of the hands of people who, after making a film about the free flow of information, tried to lock away that information forever. The truth tends to itself.

— Adrian Lamo

On June 12, 2010, a director's cut version of the film was also leaked onto torrent sites. This version of the film contains additional footage and is significantly different from the one previously leaked.

== See also ==
- Phreaking
- Trigger Street Productions
- Blue box
- John Draper
- Steve Wozniak
- Leo Laporte
- Kevin Rose
