= Thank You for Your Service (book) =

2013 nonfiction book by David Finkel

- Author: David Finkel
- Language: English
- Genre: Non-fiction
- Publisher: Farrar, Straus and Giroux
- Publication date: October 1, 2013
- Publication place: United States
- Media type: Print (hardcover)
- Pages: 272 pp
- ISBN: 978-0-374-18066-9

Thank You for Your Service, written by the American journalist David Finkel, is the follow-up non-fiction book to The Good Soldiers, which chronicles the lives of the 2-16 Infantry Battalion in Baghdad during 2007 and 2008. With this sequel, Finkel examines the soldiers' lives back home in the United States as they struggle to readjust to family and civilian life. The book was published in 2013 by Farrar, Straus and Giroux and was a finalist for the National Book Critics Circle Award.

== Selected awards and honors ==
- New York Times Book Review Notable Books of the Year - 2013
- Helen Bernstein Book Award for Excellence in Journalism
- NPR Best Book of the Year – 2013
- National Book Critics Circle Award Finalist
- Carla Furstenberg Cohen Literary Prize

== Film adaptation ==
A feature film adaptation, of same name, was released in October 2017. Written and directed by Jason Hall, the film stars Miles Teller, Haley Bennett, Beulah Koale, Amy Schumer and Scott Haze.
