= David Finkel =

American journalist

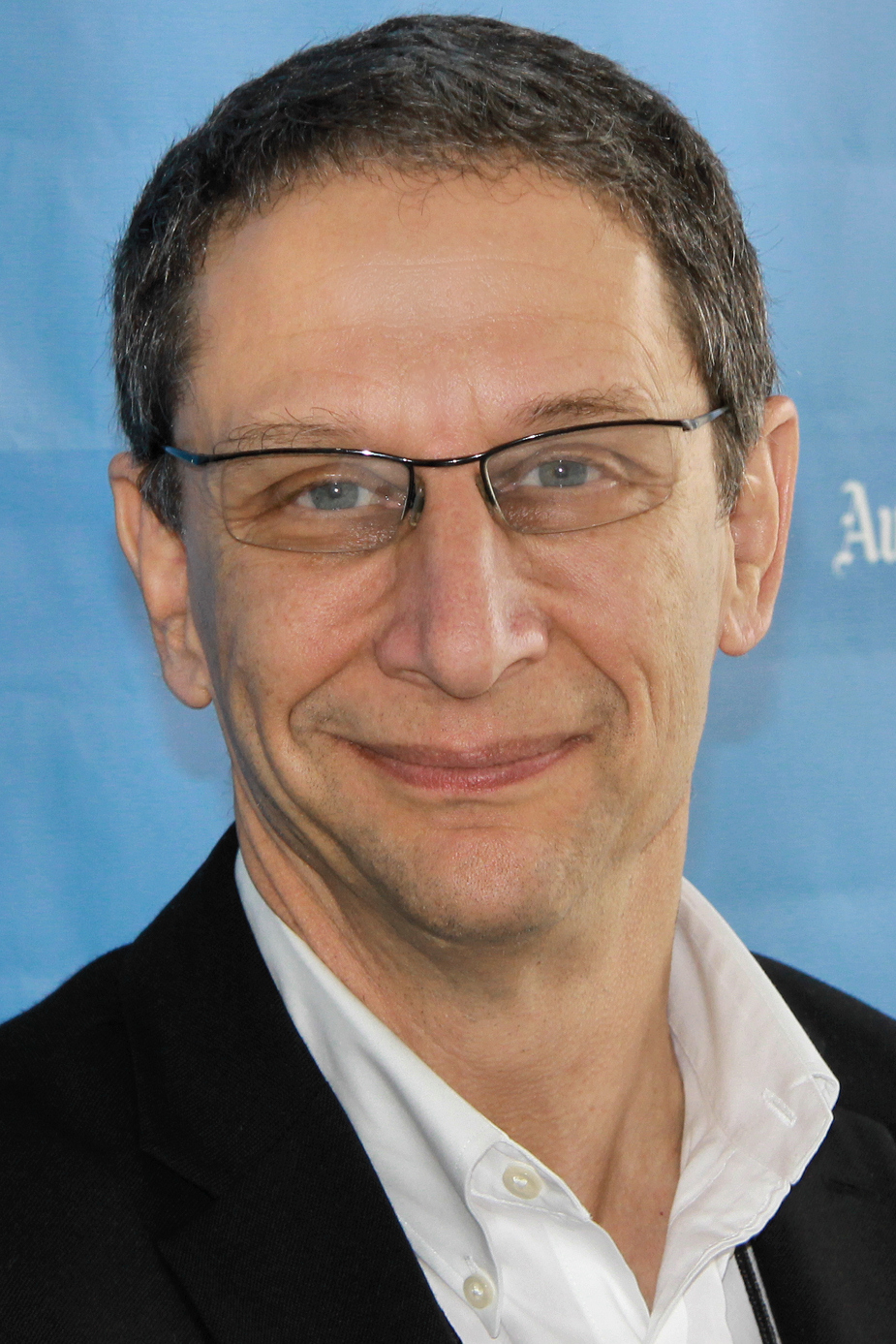
- David Finkel at the 2013 Texas Book Festival.
- Born: David Louis Finkel; October 28, 1955 (age 71)
- Education: University of Florida
- Occupations: Reporter, writer
- Writing career
- Notable awards: MacArthur Fellow; Pulitzer Prize for Explanatory Reporting

David Louis Finkel (born October 28, 1955) is an American journalist. He won a Pulitzer Prize in 2006 as a staff writer at The Washington Post. As of January 2017, he was national enterprise editor at the Post. He has also worked for the Post's foreign staff division. He wrote The Good Soldiers and Thank You for Your Service. He is a 2012 MacArthur Fellow.

== Work ==
Finkel's book The Good Soldiers describes several months he spent in 2007 as an embedded reporter with 2nd Battalion, 16th Infantry Regiment of the 4th Infantry Brigade Combat Team, 1st Infantry Division, also known as the "2-16 Rangers", as they worked to stabilize a portion of Baghdad.

The logs of Chelsea Manning's IM chats with Adrian Lamo state that David Finkel was given the Collateral Murder video but did not release it. David Finkel has never publicly disclosed whether he had the video or not. In a washingtonpost.com webchat, he said, "I based the account in my book The Good Soldiers on multiple sources, all unclassified. Without going into details, I'll say the best source of information was being there [in Iraq]." At a February 2013 pretrial hearing, Manning stated that Finkel "was quoting, I feel in verbatim, the audio communications of the aerial weapons team crew." She said, however, that she was "aghast" at Finkel's portrayal of the incident. "Reading his account," she explained, "one would believe the engagement was somehow justified as 'payback' for an earlier attack that led to the death of a soldier."

== Awards ==
- 1995 Missouri Lifestyle Journalism Award for a story about racial and class conflict.
- 2001 Robert F. Kennedy Awards for Excellence in Journalism International Print Prize for "Invisible Journeys" about illegal immigration.
- 2006 Pulitzer Prize for Explanatory Reporting, citing "his ambitious, clear-eyed case study of the United States government's attempt to bring democracy to Yemen."
- 2010 Cornelius Ryan Award for The Good Soldiers.
- 2010 J. Anthony Lukas Book Prize for The Good Soldiers.
- 2013 National Book Critics Circle Award (Nonfiction) shortlist for Thank You for Your Service
- 2014 Erikson Institute Prize for Excellence in Mental Health Media (awarded by the Erikson Institute of the Austen Riggs Center) for his investigative reporting at The Washington Post.

== Education ==
Finkel earned a Bachelor's degree in broadcasting from the University of Florida in 1977.

== Personal life ==
He lives in the Washington, D.C., area.
