= Blue Gold: World Water Wars =

- Directed by: Sam Bozzo
- Written by: Sam Bozzo; Maude Barlow; Tony Clarke
- Produced by: Mark Achbar; Si Litvinoff; Sam Bozzo
- Narrated by: Malcolm McDowell
- Edited by: Sam Bozzo
- Music by: Hannes Bertolini; Thomas Aichinger
- Distributed by: PBS
- Release date: October 7, 2008 (Vancouver International Film Festival)
- Running time: 89 minutes
- Country: United States
- Language: English

Blue Gold: World Water Wars is a 2008 documentary film directed, co-produced, and co-written by Sam Bozzo, based on the book Blue Gold: The Fight to Stop the Corporate Theft of the World’s Water by Maude Barlow and Tony Clarke.

It was produced by Mark Achbar and Si Litvinoff and was narrated by Malcolm McDowell. The film was first screened on October 9, 2008, at the Vancouver International Film Festival.

== Synopsis ==
Blue Gold: World Water Wars examines environmental and political implications of the planet's dwindling water supply, and posits that wars in the future will be fought over water. The film also highlights some success stories of water activists around the world.

== Critical reception and awards ==
- Audience award for Best Environmental Film at the Vancouver International Film Festival
- Ecology Now! award at the European Independent Film Festival
- Jury prize for best documentary feature at the Newport Beach Film Festival

== See also ==
- Water crisis
- Water politics
- Water privatization
