= Adrian Lamo =

American hacker and threat analyst (1981–2018)

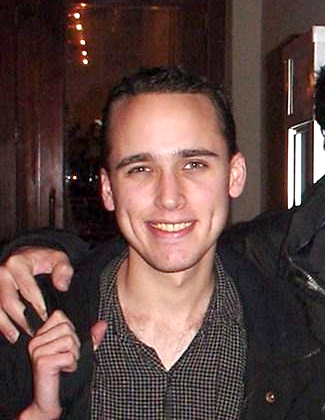
- Lamo c. 2001
- Born: Adrián Alfonso Lamo Atwood; February 20, 1981; Malden, Massachusetts, U.S.
- Died: March 14, 2018 (aged 37); Wichita, Kansas, U.S.
- Other names: Adrián Lamo, R. Adrián Lamo
- Occupations: Threat analyst, journalist
- Years active: 1999–2018
- Employer: ProjectVIGILANT
- Known for: Computer hacking, reporting Chelsea Manning to the Army's Criminal Investigation Command
- Notable work: Appeared on Hackers Wanted, We Steal Secrets, Good Morning America, Democracy Now!, Aqui y Ahora, and other media outlets, including cover stories in Information Week and SF Weekly
- Television: TechTV, KCRA Channel 3 News
- Title: Assistant Director for Threat Intelligence
- Criminal penalty: Two years' probation, with six months to be served in home detention, and ordered to pay $65,000 in restitution
- Criminal status: In 2004, pleaded guilty to one felony count in SDNY to hacking The New York Times and Microsoft, Oracle and Johnson and Johnson, subsequently informed them, and helped fix their security holes
- Spouse: Lauren Fisher (m. 2007; div. 2011)
- Website: about.me/aal

Adrián Alfonso Lamo Atwood (February 20, 1981 – March 14, 2018) was an American threat analyst and hacker. Lamo first gained media attention for breaking into several high-profile computer networks, including those of The New York Times, Yahoo!, and Microsoft, culminating in his 2003 arrest.

Lamo was best known for reporting U.S. soldier Chelsea Manning to Army criminal investigators in 2010 for leaking hundreds of thousands of sensitive U.S. government documents to WikiLeaks. Lamo died on March 14, 2018, at the age of 37.

== Early life and education ==
Adrian Lamo was born in Malden, Massachusetts. His father, Mario Ricardo Lamo, was Colombian. Adrian Lamo attended high school in San Francisco, from which he did not graduate, but received a GED and was court-ordered to take courses at American River College, a community college in Sacramento County, California. Lamo began his hacking efforts by hacking games on the Commodore 64 and through phone phreaking.

== Activities and legal issues ==
Lamo first became known for operating the AOL watchdog site Inside-AOL.com.

=== Security compromise ===
Lamo was a grey hat hacker who viewed the rise of the World Wide Web with a mixture of excitement and alarm. He felt that others failed to see the importance of internet security in the Web's early days. Lamo broke into corporate computer systems but never damaged them. Instead, he would offer to fix the security flaws free of charge, and if the flaw was not fixed, he would alert the media. Lamo hoped to be hired by a corporation to attempt to break into systems and test their security, a practice that came to be known as red teaming. But by the time this practice was common, his felony conviction prevented him from being hired.

In December 2001, WorldCom praised Lamo for helping to fortify its corporate security. In February 2002, he broke into the internal computer network of The New York Times, added his name to the internal database of expert sources, and used the paper's LexisNexis account to research high-profile subjects. The New York Times filed a complaint, and a warrant for Lamo's arrest was issued in August 2003 following a 15-month investigation by federal prosecutors in New York. At 10:15 a.m. on September 9, after spending a few days in hiding, he surrendered to the US Marshals in Sacramento, California. He surrendered to the FBI in New York City on September 11, and pleaded guilty to one felony count of computer crimes against Microsoft, LexisNexis, and The New York Times on January 8, 2004.

In July 2004, Lamo was sentenced to two years' probation with six months to be served in home detention and ordered to pay $65,000 in restitution. He was convicted of compromising security at The New York Times, Microsoft, Yahoo!, and WorldCom.

When challenged for a response to allegations that he was glamorizing crime for the sake of publicity, he responded: "Anything I could say about my person or my actions would only cheapen what they have to say for themselves". When approached for comment during his criminal case, Lamo frustrated reporters with non-sequiturs, such as "Faith manages" and "It's a beautiful day."

At his sentencing, Lamo expressed remorse for the harm his intrusions had caused. The court record quotes him as adding: "I want to answer for what I have done and do better with my life."

He subsequently declared on the question-and-answer site Quora: "We all own our actions in fullness, not just the pleasant aspects of them." Lamo accepted that he had made mistakes.

=== DNA controversy ===
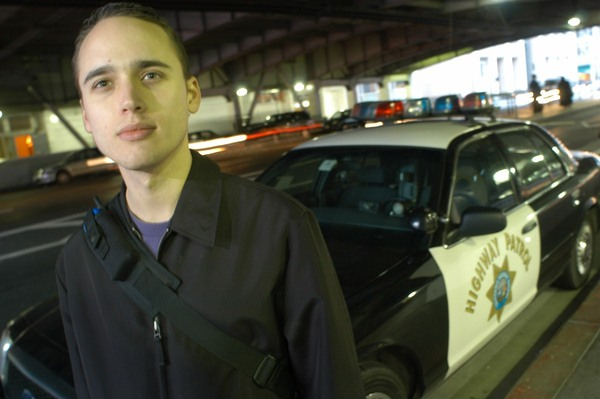
Lamo in San Francisco in 2006

On May 9, 2006, 18 months into a two-year probation sentence, Lamo refused to give the United States government a blood sample it had demanded to record his DNA in its CODIS system. According to his attorney at the time, Lamo had a religious objection to giving blood but was willing to give his DNA in another form. On June 15, 2006, Lamo's lawyers filed a motion citing the Book of Genesis as one basis for Lamo's religious opposition to giving blood.

On June 20, 2007, Lamo's legal counsel reached a settlement agreement with the U.S. Department of Justice whereby Lamo would submit a cheek swab instead of a blood sample.

=== WikiLeaks and Chelsea Manning ===
In February 2009, a partial list of the anonymous donors to the WikiLeaks website was leaked and published on the site. Some media sources indicated at the time that Lamo was among the donors on the list. Lamo commented on his Twitter page, "Thanks WikiLeaks, for leaking your donor list... That's dedication."

In May 2010, Lamo informed U.S. Army authorities that Chelsea Manning had claimed to have leaked a large body of classified documents, including 260,000 classified United States diplomatic cables. He said that Manning also "took credit for leaking" the video footage of the July 12, 2007, Baghdad airstrike, which has since come to be known as the "Collateral Murder" video.

Lamo said he would not have turned Manning in "if lives weren't in danger". He characterized her as "in a war zone and basically trying to vacuum up as much classified information as [she] could and just throwing it up into the air." WikiLeaks responded by denouncing Lamo and the author of the article as "notorious felons, informers & manipulators", and said: "journalists should take care."

Lamo was a volunteer "adversary characterization" analyst for Project Vigilant, a Florida-based government contractor, which encouraged him to inform the government about the alleged WikiLeaks source. The head of Project Vigilant, Chet Uber, claimed, "I'm the one who called the U.S. government... All the people who say that Adrian is a narc, he did a patriotic thing. He sees all kinds of hacks, and he was seriously worried about people dying."

The Taliban insurgency later announced its intention to execute Afghan nationals named in the leaks as having cooperated with the U.S.-led coalition in Afghanistan. By that time, the U.S. had received months of advance warning that their names were among the leaks. Manning was arrested and incarcerated in the U.S. military justice system and later sentenced to 35 years in confinement. President Barack Obama commuted the sentence to seven years, including time served. Lamo responded to the commutation with a post on Medium and an interview with U.S. News & World Report.

Lamo characterized his decision to work with the government as morally ambiguous but objectively necessary, writing that "there were no right choices that day, only less wrong ones. It was cold, it was needful, and it was no one's to make except mine." Lamo was criticized by fellow hackers, such as those at the Hackers on Planet Earth conference in 2010, who labeled him a "snitch." Another told Lamo, following his speech during a panel discussion: "from my perspective, I see what you have done as treason."

=== Greenwald, Lamo, and Wired magazine ===
Lamo's role in Manning's case drew criticism from Glenn Greenwald, who suggested that Lamo lied to Manning by turning her in and then lied after the fact to cover up the circumstances of her confessions. In an article about the case, Greenwald mentioned Wired reporter Kevin Poulsen's 1994 felony conviction for computer hacking and wrote that "over the years, Poulsen has served more or less as Lamo's personal media voice." In an article titled "The Worsening Journalistic Disgrace at Wired", Greenwald wrote that Wired was "actively conceal[ing] from the public, for months on end, the key evidence [the full Lamo–Manning chat logs] in a political story that has generated headlines around the world."

This drew a response from Wired: "At his most reasonable, Greenwald impugns our motives, attacks the character of our staff and carefully selects his facts and sources to misrepresent the truth and generate outrage in his readership."

On July 13, 2011, Wired published the Lamo–Manning chat logs in full, stating: "The most significant of the unpublished details have now been publicly established with sufficient authority that we no longer believe any purpose is served by withholding the logs." Greenwald wrote that the logs validated his claim that Wired had concealed important evidence.

== Film and television ==
On August 22, 2002, Lamo was removed from a segment of NBC Nightly News when, after being asked to demonstrate his skills for the camera, he gained access to NBC's internal network. NBC was concerned that it broke the law by taping Lamo while he possibly broke the law. Lamo was a guest on The Screen Savers five times beginning in 2002.

Hackers Wanted, a documentary film focusing on Lamo's life as a hacker, was produced by Trigger Street Productions and narrated by Kevin Spacey. Focusing on the 2003 hacking scene, the film features interviews with Kevin Rose and Steve Wozniak. The film has not been conventionally released. In May 2009, a video purporting to be a trailer for Hackers Wanted was allegedly leaked onto the Internet film site Eye Crave Network. In May 2010, an early cut of the film was leaked via BitTorrent. According to an insider, what was leaked on the Internet was very different from the newer version, which includes additional footage. On June 12, 2010, a director's cut version of the film was leaked onto torrent sites.

Lamo also appeared on Good Morning America, Fox News, Democracy Now!, Frontline, and repeatedly on KCRA-TV News as an expert on netcentric crime and incidents. He was interviewed for the documentaries We Steal Secrets: The Story of WikiLeaks and True Stories: WikiLeaks – Secrets and Lies. Lamo reconnected with Leo Laporte in 2015 as a result of a Quora article on the "dark web" for an episode of The New Screen Savers.

Lamo wrote the book Ask Adrian, a collection of his best Q&A drawn from over 500 pages of Quora answers.

== Personal life and death ==
Lamo was known as the "Homeless Hacker" for his reportedly transient lifestyle, claiming that he spent much of his travels couch-surfing, squatting in abandoned buildings, and traveling to Internet cafés, libraries, and universities to investigate networks, sometimes exploiting security holes. He usually preferred sleeping on couches, and when he did sleep on beds, he did not sleep under covers. He was taken in by Bill and Debbie Scroggin in rural Wichita, Kansas for a time before being kicked out. He often wandered through their house and home office in the middle of the night, by the light of a flashlight.

Lamo was bisexual and volunteered for the gay and lesbian media firm PlanetOut Inc. in the mid-1990s. In 1998, he was appointed to the Lesbian, Gay, Bisexual, Transgender, Queer and Questioning Youth Task Force by the San Francisco Board of Supervisors.

Lamo used a wide variety of supplements and drugs. His wife, Lauren Fisher, called his drug use "body hacking". One of Lamo's preferred supplements was 'kratom' (Mitragyna speciosa), which he used as a less-dangerous alternative to opioids. In 2001, he overdosed on prescription amphetamines. After he turned in Manning, his drug use escalated, but he later claimed that he was in recovery.

In a 2004 interview with Wired, an ex-girlfriend of Lamo's called him "very controlling", alleging "he carried a stun gun, which he used on me". The same article claimed a court had issued a restraining order against Lamo; he disputed the claim, writing: "I have never been subject to a restraining order in my life".

Lamo said in a Wired article that, in May 2010, after he reported the theft of his backpack, an investigating officer noted unusual behavior and placed him under a 72-hour involuntary psychiatric hold, which was extended to a nine-day hold. Lamo said he was diagnosed with Asperger syndrome at the psychiatric ward.

For a period of time in March 2011, Lamo was allegedly "in hiding", claiming that his "life was under threat" after turning in Manning.

Lamo died on March 14, 2018, in Wichita, Kansas, at age 37. Nearly three months later, the Sedgwick County Regional Forensic Science Center reported that "Despite a complete autopsy and supplemental testing, no definitive cause of death was identified." Many bottles of pills were found in his home, some of which were known to cause severe health problems when combined with kratom. As a result, evidence points to an accidental death due to drug abuse.

== See also ==
- List of unsolved deaths
