= Forward Operating Base Loyalty =

US military base in Baghdad, Iraq

- New Baghdad, Baghdad, Iraq

Site information
- Type: Forward Operating Base
- Controlled by: United States; United States Army

Location
- Location of FOB Loyalty
- Location within Iraq
- Coordinates: 33.328682°N 44.481196°E

Site history
- Built: 2003
- Battles/wars: Operation Iraqi Freedom; Operation New Dawn

Garrison information
- Garrison: 4th BCT, 101st ABN DIV
- Occupants: 1st Battalion 7th Field Artillery, 2nd Heavy Brigade Combat Team, 1st Infantry Division 2010-2011

Forward Operating Base Loyalty is a former forward operating base used by the U.S. Army during Operation Iraqi Freedom and Operation New Dawn located in the New Baghdad District (Arabic: بغداد الجديدة) of Baghdad, Iraq.

FOB Iron Horse was renamed FOB Patriot and then renamed to FOB Loyalty, during OIF II and OIF III. Also the location was in East Baghdad. It started with 1st Cav/1st Brigade and 3RD ID came in Dec/January 2005. It also housed the prison for Political Prisoners.

== History ==
FOB Loyalty was located in what was Saddam Hussein's Directorate of Internal Security. A handful of the hardened concrete buildings were damaged by US forces during the initial invasion of Iraq. The main building took three or four precision-guided bombs, and another precision bomb wiped out the house Saddam used when he visited the base.

The base included a roofed pool, with construction started by Saddam's men and completed by Kellogg Brown & Root contractors, allowing U.S. armed forces members to use. No Army and Air Force Exchange Service Facility existed on the FOB, however a small sundry store existed allowing for basic necessities.

FOB Loyalty was attacked on April 28, 2008 by improvised Rocket-Assisted Mortars, known as lob bombs, killing a number of servicemen on the base. The base sustained repeated mortar attacks throughout 2008 and 2009.

Joint Security Station Loyalty was again attacked by a lob bomb on 6 June 2011, killing 5 US servicemembers and injuring 12 others; another servicemember died from his wounds four days later.

Joint Security Station Loyalty was transferred to full Iraqi Government control on August 29, 2011.

== See also ==
- List of United States Military installations in Iraq
