= Maude Barlow =

Canadian author and activist

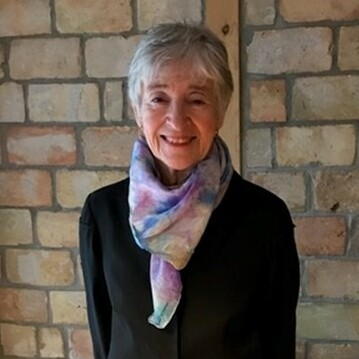
- Maude Barlow in 2023
- Born: Maude Victoria Barlow; May 24, 1947 (age 79); Toronto, Ontario, Canada
- Occupations: Author and activist
- Known for: The Council of Canadians, Food & Water Watch, World Future Council
- Awards: Right Livelihood Award

Maude Victoria Barlow (born May 24, 1947) is a Canadian author and activist. She is a founding member and former board chair of The Council of Canadians, a citizens' advocacy organization. She is also the co-founder of the Blue Planet Project, which works internationally for the human right to water. Barlow chairs the board of Washington-based Food & Water Watch, serves on the board of advisors to the Global Alliance on the Rights of Nature, was a founding member of the San Francisco–based International Forum on Globalization, and was a councillor with the Hamburg-based World Future Council. She was the chancellor of Brescia University College at Western University for three years starting in 2020. In 2008/2009, she was Senior Advisor on Water to the 63rd President of the United Nations General Assembly.

She has authored and co-authored 20 books, including Whose Water is it Anyway?: Taking Water Protection into Public Hands and Still Hopeful: Lessons From a Lifetime of Activism.

== Water policy ==
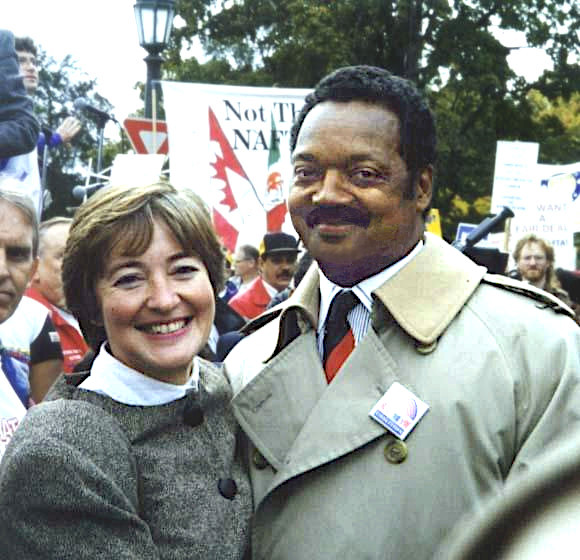
Barlow with American activist Jesse Jackson in 2005.

Barlow proposes the remunicipalization of water and sanitation services:

The public and communities lose control as local government officials abdicate control over a vital public service. Private water companies are accountable to their shareholders, not to the people they serve and often restrict public access to information about their operations. Because they have to make a profit, they have to cut corners, raise water rates or lay off workers - often all three."

== Film ==
Barlow is featured in Sam Bozzo's documentary film Blue Gold: World Water Wars, based on Barlow and Tony Clarke's Blue Gold: The Right to Stop the Corporate Theft of the World's Water, as well as Irena Salina's documentary Flow: For Love of Water and Liz Marshall's Water on the Table. Barlow also contributes to a blog associated with Water on the Table.

Barlow is the subject of a National Film Board of Canada documentary called Democracy à la Maude as well as a CBC TV Life and Times biography.

== Published works ==
=== Books ===
==== Author or co-author ====
- Parcel of Rogues: How Free Trade Is Failing Canada – Key Porter Books, Toronto (1990) ISBN 978-1-55013-365-3.
- Take Back the Nation (with Bruce Campbell) – Key Porter Books, Toronto (1991) ISBN 978-1-55013-367-7.
- Take Back the Nation 2: Meeting the Threat of NAFTA (with Bruce Campbell) – Key Porter Books, Toronto (1993) ISBN 978-1-55013-498-8.
- Class Warfare: The Assault on Canada's Schools (with Heather-Jane Robertson) – Key Porter Books, Toronto (1994) ISBN 1-55013-559-7.
- Straight through the Heart: How the Liberals Abandoned the Just Society (with Bruce Campbell) – HarperCollins, Toronto (1995) ISBN 0-00-638580-X.
- The Big Black Book: The Essential Views of Conrad and Barbara Amiel Black (with Jim Winter) – Stoddart, Toronto (1997) ISBN 0-7737-5904-2.
- MAI: The Multilateral Agreement on Investment and the Threat to Canadian Sovereignty (with Tony Clarke) – Stoddart, Toronto (1997) ISBN 0-7737-5946-8.
- MAI: The Multilateral Agreement on Investment and the Threat to American Freedom (with Tony Clarke) – Stoddart, Toronto (1998) ISBN 978-0-7737-5979-4.
- The Fight of My Life: Confessions of an Unrepentant Canadian – HarperCollins, Toronto (1998) ISBN 0-00-255761-4.
- MAI Round 2: New Global and Internal Threats to Canadian Sovereignty (with Tony Clarke) – Stoddart, Toronto (1998) ISBN 978-0-7737-6021-9.
- Frederick Street: Life and Death on Canada's Love Canal (with Elizabeth May) – HarperCollins, Toronto (2000) ISBN 978-0-00-200036-9.
- Global Showdown: How the New Activists Are Fighting Global Corporate Rule (with Tony Clarke) – Stoddart, Toronto (2001) ISBN 0-7737-3264-0.
- Blue Gold: The Battle Against Corporate Theft of the World's Water (with Tony Clarke) – Stoddart, Toronto (2002) ISBN 0-7710-1086-9.
- Profit Is Not the Cure: A Citizen's Guide to Saving Medicare – McClelland & Stewart, Toronto (2002) ISBN 0-7710-1084-2.
- Too Close For Comfort: Canada's Future Within Fortress North America – McClelland & Stewart, Toronto (2005) ISBN 0-7710-1088-5.
- Blue Covenant: The Global Water Crisis and the Fight for the Right to Water – McClelland & Stewart, Toronto (2007) ISBN 978-0-7710-1072-9.
- Blue Future: Protecting Water for People and the Planet Forever – House of Anansi Press, Toronto (2013) ISBN 978-1-7708-9406-8.
- Boiling Point: Government Neglect, Corporate Abuse, and Canada's Water Crisis – ECW Press, Toronto (2016) ISBN 978-1-7704-1355-9.
- Whose Water Is It Anyway?: Taking Water Protection into Public Hands – ECW Press, Toronto (2019) ISBN 177-0-4143-04.
- Still Hopeful: Lessons from a Lifetime of Activism – ECW Press, Toronto (2022) ISBN 9781770416321.
- Earth for Sale: The Fight to Stop the Last Plunder of the Planet – ECW Press, Toronto (2026) ISBN 978-1778525728.

==== Contributor ====
- The Silent Revolution: Media, Democracy, and the Free Trade Debate – edited by James P. Winter, University of Ottawa Press (1990)
- Trading Freedom: How Free Trade Affect our Lives, Work, and Environment – edited by John Cavanagh, John Gershman, Karen Baker, and Gretchen Helmke, Institute for Policy Studies, Washington (1992)
- Crossing the Line: Canada and Free Trade With Mexico – edited by Jim Sinclair, New Star Books, Vancouver (1992)
- The Charlottetown Accord, the Referendum, and the Future of Canada – edited by Kenneth McRoberts and Patrick J. Monahan, University of Toronto Press (1993)
- The Trojan Horse: Alberta and the Future of Canada – edited by Gordon Laxer and Trevor Harrison, Black Rose Books, Edmonton (1995)
- The Case Against the Global Economy and for a Turn Toward the Local – edited by Jerry Mander and Edward Goldsmith, Sierra Club Books, New York (1996)
- Globalization and the Live Performing Arts: Conference Papers – Monash University, Melbourne (2001)
- Alternatives to Economic Globalization: a Report of the International Forum on Globalization – edited by John Cavanagh and Jerry Mander, Berrett-Koehler Publishers, San Francisco (2002)
- Whose Water Is It?: The Unquenchable Thirst of a Water-Hungry World – edited by Bernadette McDonald and Douglas Jehl, National Geographic, Washington (2003)
- Meeting the Global Challenge: Competitive Position and Strategic Response – edited by Tom Wesson, York University Press, Toronto (2004)
- Globalization, Human Rights & Citizenship: an Anthology from the Gannett Lecture Series – edited by Robert Manning, Rochester Institute of Technology (2005)

=== Reports ===
- "Blue Gold: the Global Water Crisis and the Commodification of the World’s Water Supply" – International Forum on Globalization, San Francisco (June 1999)
- "The Free Trade Area of the Americas: the Threat to Social Programs, Environmental Sustainability and Social Justice" – International Forum on Globalization, San Francisco (February 2001)
- "The World Trade Organization and the Threat to Canada's Social Programs" – The Council of Canadians, Ottawa (September 2001)
- "Profit is Not the Cure: a Call to Action on the Future of Health Care in Canada" – The Council of Canadians, Ottawa (Winter 2002)
- "Making the Links: a Citizen's Guide to the World Trade Organization and the Free Trade Area of the Americas" (with Tony Clarke) – The Council of Canadians, Ottawa (Summer 2003)
- "The Global Fight Against Privatization of Water: Annual Report" – The World Forum on Alternatives, Geneva (April 2004)
- "The Canada We Want: a Citizen's Alternative to Deep Integration" – The Council of Canadians, Ottawa (March 2004)

== See also ==
- Free trade
- Commodification of water
