= The Good Soldiers =

Book by David Finkel

- The Good Soldiers first edition cover.
- Author: David Finkel
- Language: English
- Genre: Non-Fiction
- Publisher: Picador USA
- Publication date: January 1, 2009
- Publication place: United States
- Media type: Print (Hardback & Paperback); Amazon Kindle iBooks (electronic) iTunes (audio book)
- Pages: 336
- ISBN: 0312430027
- Followed by: Thank You for Your Service

The Good Soldiers (2009) is a non-fiction book about the 2007 troop surge in Iraq written by David Finkel, chronicling the deployment of the 2nd Battalion, 16th Infantry Regiment, 4th Brigade Combat Team, 1st Infantry Division, nicknamed "Rangers", under the command of Lieutenant Colonel Ralph Kauzlarich. The story follows Kauzlarich as he experiences the reality of war, and loses soldiers for the first time.

== Background ==
In 2007 David Finkel embedded with 2nd Battalion, 16th Infantry Regiment of the 4th Infantry Brigade Combat Team, 1st Infantry Division, also known as the "2–16 Rangers", as they worked to stabilize a portion of Baghdad. During this time he witnessed first hand the realities of war and the toll it takes on those who engage in it. Using his experience reporting on the United States activities in Yemen, David Finkel writes on the then ongoing Iraq War from the focused perspective of a single U.S. Army Infantry Battalion.

== Reception ==
The Good Soldiers is a recipient of the ALA Alex Award (2010) and the Cornelius Ryan Award.
