= Jason Hall (screenwriter) =

American filmmaker

- Born: Jason Dean Hall; April 28, 1972 (age 54); Lake Arrowhead, California, U.S.
- Education: University of Southern California
- Occupations: Screenwriter, film director, former actor

Jason Dean Hall (born April 28, 1972) is an American screenwriter, film director, and former actor. He played the recurring character of Devon MacLeish in Buffy the Vampire Slayer. He had a guest starring role on Without a Trace as Jesse in season two.

As a screenwriter, Hall wrote Spread (2009), Paranoia (2013) (with Barry Levy), and the screenplay for American Sniper (2014), for which he received an Academy Award nomination for Best Adapted Screenplay. He then wrote and directed Thank You for Your Service (2017) and co-wrote Gran Turismo (2023).

== Early life ==
Hall attended Phillips Exeter Academy. He studied business, English, and cinema at the University of Southern California.

== Filmography ==
Year	Title	Director	Writer	Producer
2009	Spread	No	Yes	Associate
2013	Paranoia	No	Yes	No
2014	American Sniper	No	Yes	Executive
2017	Thank You for Your Service	Yes	Yes	No
2023	Gran Turismo	No	Yes	Executive
2027	The Thomas Crown Affair	No	Yes	No
TBA	Untitled Mike Thornton biopic film	No	Yes	No

== Accolades ==
Year	Award	Category	Title	Result
2014	Academy Awards	Best Adapted Screenplay	American Sniper	Nominated
2014	BAFTA Awards	Best Adapted Screenplay	American Sniper	Nominated
2014	Satellite Awards	Best Adapted Screenplay	American Sniper	Nominated
2014	Writers Guild of America	Best Adapted Screenplay	American Sniper	Nominated
