= 1981 in the United States =

- Decades: 1960s; 1970s; 1980s; 1990s; 2000s
- See also: History of the United States (1980–1991); Timeline of United States history (1970–1989); List of years in the United States

Events from the year 1981 in the United States.

== Incumbents ==
=== Federal government ===
- President:

Jimmy Carter (D-Georgia) (until January 20)
Ronald Reagan (R-California) (starting January 20)

- Vice President:

Walter Mondale (D-Minnesota) (until January 20)
George H. W. Bush (R-Texas) (starting January 20)

- Chief Justice: Warren E. Burger (Virginia)
- Speaker of the House of Representatives: Tip O'Neill (D-Massachusetts)
- Senate Majority Leader:

Robert Byrd (D-West Virginia) (until January 3)
Howard Baker (R-Tennessee) (starting January 3)

- Congress: 96th (until January 3), 97th (starting January 3)

==== State governments ====
Governors and lieutenant governors

=== Governors ===
- Governor of Alabama: Fob James (Democratic)
- Governor of Alaska: Jay Hammond (Republican)
- Governor of Arizona: Bruce Babbitt (Democratic)
- Governor of Arkansas: Bill Clinton (Democratic) (until January 19), Frank D. White (Republican) (starting January 19)
- Governor of California: Jerry Brown (Democratic)
- Governor of Colorado: Richard Lamm (Democratic)
- Governor of Connecticut: William A. O'Neill (Democratic)
- Governor of Delaware: Pierre S. du Pont, IV (Republican)
- Governor of Florida: Bob Graham (Democratic)
- Governor of Georgia: George Busbee (Democratic)
- Governor of Hawaii: George Ariyoshi (Democratic)
- Governor of Idaho: John V. Evans (Democratic)
- Governor of Illinois: James R. Thompson (Republican)
- Governor of Indiana: Otis R. Bowen (Republican) (until January 12), Robert D. Orr (Republican) (starting January 12)
- Governor of Iowa: Robert D. Ray (Republican)
- Governor of Kansas: John W. Carlin (Democratic)
- Governor of Kentucky: John Y. Brown Jr. (Democratic)
- Governor of Louisiana: David C. Treen (Republican)
- Governor of Maine: Joseph E. Brennan (Democratic)
- Governor of Maryland: Harry R. Hughes (Democratic)
- Governor of Massachusetts: Edward J. King (Democratic)
- Governor of Michigan: William Milliken (Republican)
- Governor of Minnesota: Al Quie (Republican)
- Governor of Mississippi: William Winter (Democratic)
- Governor of Missouri: Joseph P. Teasdale (Democratic) (until January 12), Kit Bond (Republican) (starting January 12)
- Governor of Montana: Thomas Lee Judge (Democratic) (until January 5), Ted Schwinden (Democratic) (starting January 5)
- Governor of Nebraska: Charles Thone (Republican)
- Governor of Nevada: Robert List (Republican)
- Governor of New Hampshire: Hugh J. Gallen (Democratic)
- Governor of New Jersey: Brendan Byrne (Democratic)
- Governor of New Mexico: Bruce King (Democratic)
- Governor of New York: Hugh Carey (Democratic)
- Governor of North Carolina: Jim Hunt (Democratic)
- Governor of North Dakota: Arthur A. Link (Democratic) (until January 6), Allen I. Olson (Republican) (starting January 6)
- Governor of Ohio: Jim Rhodes (Republican)
- Governor of Oklahoma: George Nigh (Democratic)
- Governor of Oregon: Victor G. Atiyeh (Republican)
- Governor of Pennsylvania: Dick Thornburgh (Republican)
- Governor of Rhode Island: J. Joseph Garrahy (Democratic)
- Governor of South Carolina: Richard Riley (Democratic)
- Governor of South Dakota: William J. Janklow (Republican)
- Governor of Tennessee: Lamar Alexander (Republican)
- Governor of Texas: Bill Clements (Republican)
- Governor of Utah: Scott M. Matheson (Democratic)
- Governor of Vermont: Richard A. Snelling (Republican)
- Governor of Virginia: John N. Dalton (Republican)
- Governor of Washington: Dixy Lee Ray (Democratic) (until January 14), John Spellman (Republican) (starting January 14)
- Governor of West Virginia: Jay Rockefeller (Democratic)
- Governor of Wisconsin: Lee S. Dreyfus (Republican)
- Governor of Wyoming: Edgar J. Herschler (Democratic)

=== Lieutenant governors ===
- Lieutenant Governor of Alabama: George McMillan (Democratic)
- Lieutenant Governor of Alaska: Terry Miller (Republican)
- Lieutenant Governor of Arkansas: Joe Purcell (Democratic) (until January 19), Winston Bryant (Democratic) (starting January 19)
- Lieutenant Governor of California: Mike Curb (Republican)
- Lieutenant Governor of Colorado: Nancy Dick (Democratic)
- Lieutenant Governor of Connecticut: Joseph J. Fauliso (Democratic)
- Lieutenant Governor of Delaware: James D. McGinnis (Democratic) (until January 20), Michael N. Castle (Republican) (starting January 20)
- Lieutenant Governor of Florida: Wayne Mixson (Democratic)
- Lieutenant Governor of Georgia: Zell Miller (Democratic)
- Lieutenant Governor of Hawaii: Jean King (Democratic)
- Lieutenant Governor of Idaho: Phil Batt (Democratic)
- Lieutenant Governor of Illinois: Dave O'Neal (Republican) (until July 31), vacant (starting July 31)
- Lieutenant Governor of Indiana: Robert D. Orr (Republican) (until January 12), John Mutz (Republican) (starting January 12)
- Lieutenant Governor of Iowa: Terry E. Branstad (Republican)
- Lieutenant Governor of Kansas: Paul V. Dugan (Democratic)
- Lieutenant Governor of Kentucky: Martha Layne Collins (Democratic)
- Lieutenant Governor of Louisiana: Robert "Bobby" Freeman (Democratic)
- Lieutenant Governor of Maryland: Samuel Bogley (Democratic)
- Lieutenant Governor of Massachusetts: Thomas P. O'Neill III (Democratic)
- Lieutenant Governor of Michigan: James H. Brickley (Republican)
- Lieutenant Governor of Minnesota: Lou Wangberg (Republican)
- Lieutenant Governor of Mississippi: Brad Dye (Democratic)
- Lieutenant Governor of Missouri: William C. Phelps (Republican) (until January 12), Kenneth Rothman (Democratic) (starting January 12)
- Lieutenant Governor of Montana: Ted Schwinden (Democratic) (until January 5), George Turman (Democratic) (starting January 5)
- Lieutenant Governor of Nebraska: Roland Luedtke (Republican)
- Lieutenant Governor of Nevada: Myron E. Leavitt (Democratic)
- Lieutenant Governor of New Mexico: Roberto Mondragón (Democratic)
- Lieutenant Governor of New York: Mario Cuomo (Democratic)
- Lieutenant Governor of North Carolina: James C. Green (Democratic)
- Lieutenant Governor of North Dakota: Wayne G. Sanstead (Democratic) (until month and day unknown), Ernest Sands (Republican) (starting month and day unknown)
- Lieutenant Governor of Ohio: vacant
- Lieutenant Governor of Oklahoma: Spencer Bernard (Democratic)
- Lieutenant Governor of Pennsylvania: William Scranton, III (Republican)
- Lieutenant Governor of Rhode Island: Thomas R. DiLuglio (Democratic)
- Lieutenant Governor of South Carolina: Nancy Stevenson (Democratic)
- Lieutenant Governor of South Dakota: Lowell C. Hansen II (Republican)
- Lieutenant Governor of Tennessee: John S. Wilder (Democratic)
- Lieutenant Governor of Texas: William P. Hobby Jr. (Democratic)
- Lieutenant Governor of Utah: David Smith Monson (Republican)
- Lieutenant Governor of Vermont: Madeleine M. Kunin (Democratic)
- Lieutenant Governor of Virginia: Chuck Robb (Democratic)
- Lieutenant Governor of Washington: John Cherberg (Democratic)
- Lieutenant Governor of Wisconsin: Russell A. Olson (Republican)

== Events ==
=== January ===
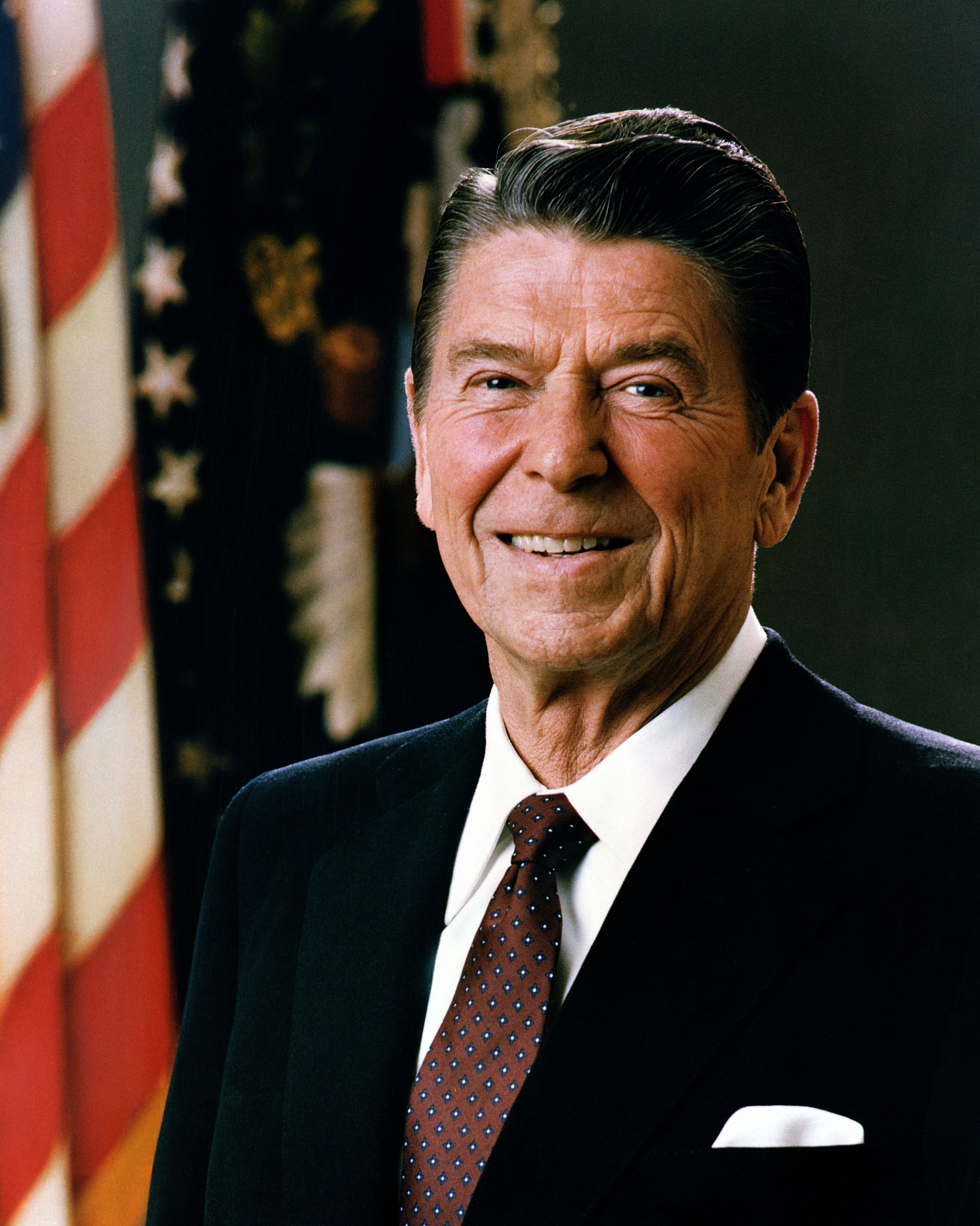
January 20: Ronald Reagan becomes the 40th U.S. president

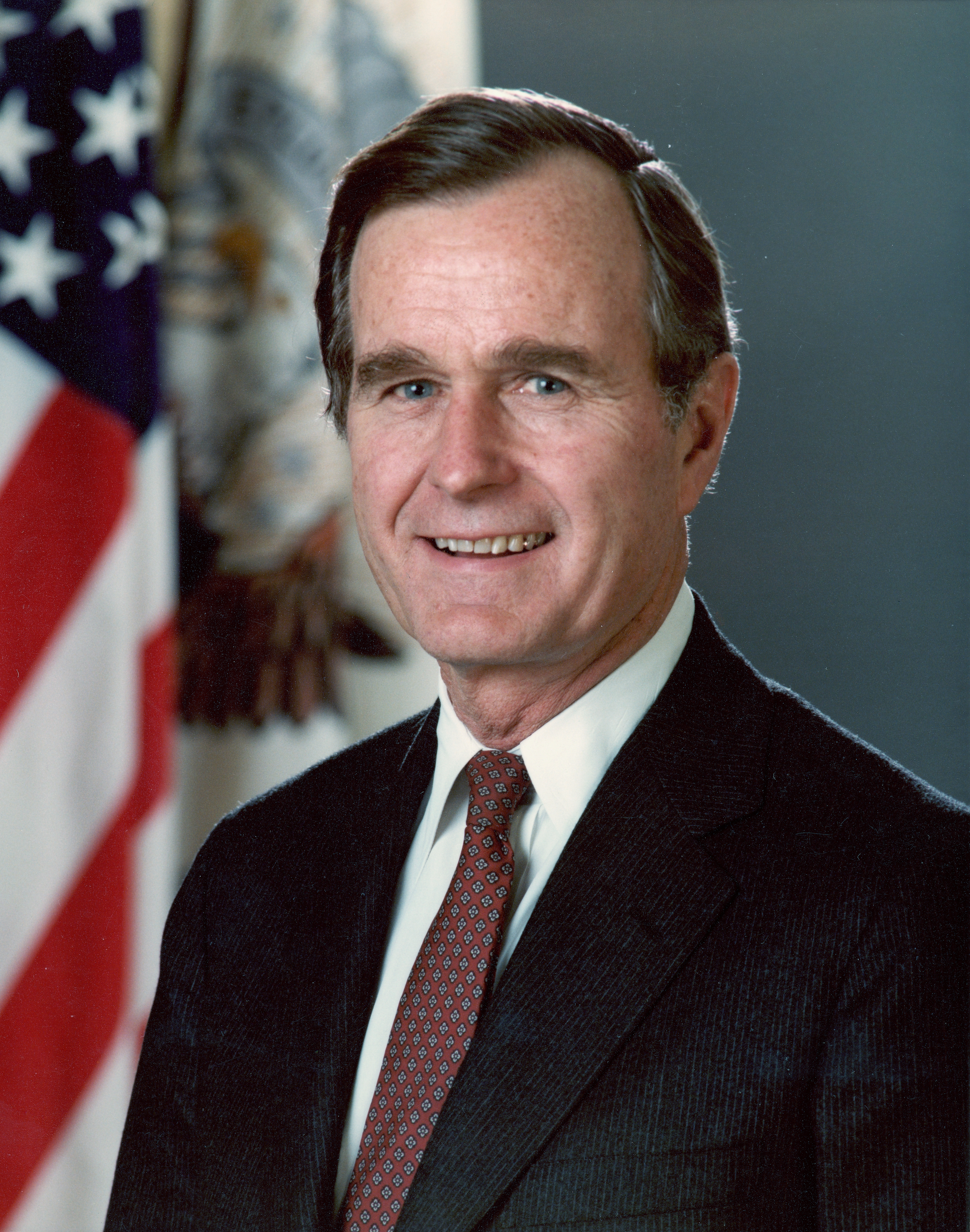
January 20: George H. W. Bush becomes the 43rd U.S. vice president

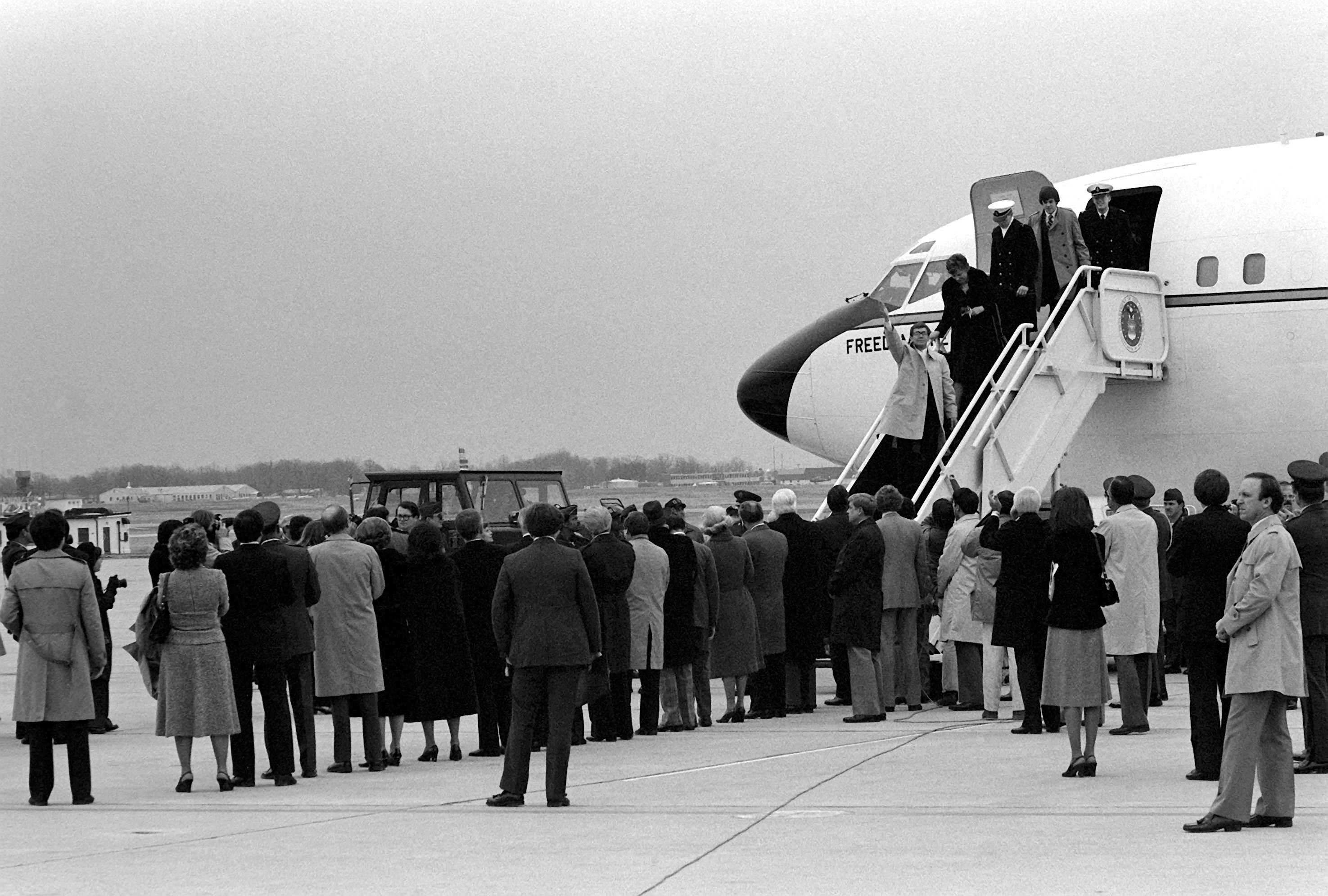
January 20: The Iran hostage crisis ends with their release

- January 16 – Women in Housing and Finance: conduct first meeting in New York City.
- January 19 – United States and Iranian officials sign an agreement to release 52 American hostages after 14 months of captivity.
- January 20 – Ronald Reagan is sworn in as the 40th president of the United States, and George H. W. Bush is sworn in as the 43rd vice president. Minutes later, Iran releases the 52 Americans held for 444 days, ending the Iran hostage crisis.
- January 25 – Super Bowl XV: The Oakland Raiders defeat the Philadelphia Eagles 27–10 at the Louisiana Superdome in New Orleans, Louisiana.

=== February ===
- February 10 – A fire at the Las Vegas Hilton hotel-casino kills eight and injures 198.
- February 18 – President Reagan delivers his first address to the 97th Congress.

=== March ===
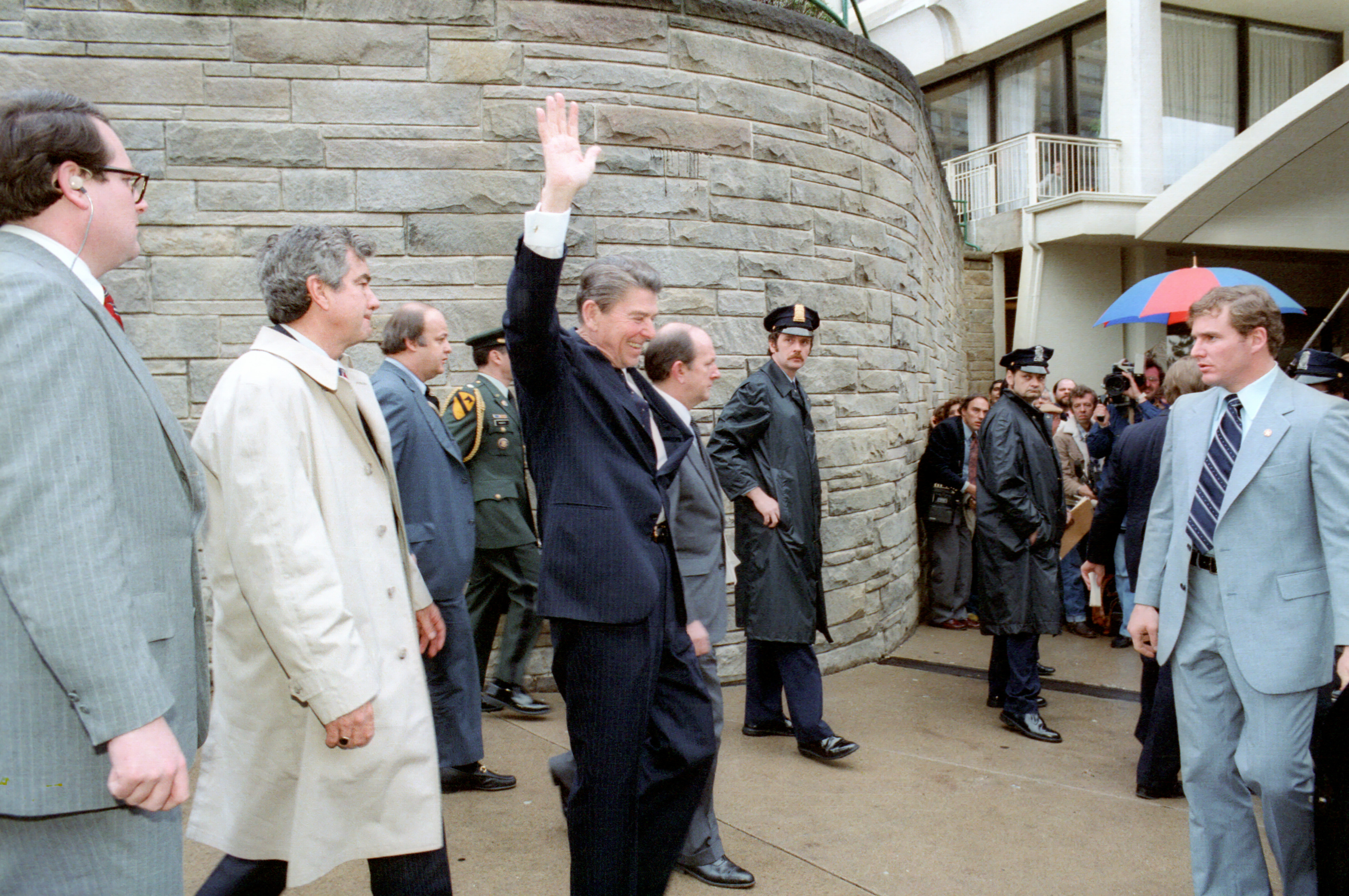
March 30: Reagan assassination attempt

- March 6 – After 19 years hosting the CBS Evening News, Walter Cronkite signs off for the last time.
- March 19 – Three workers are killed and five are injured during a test of the Space Shuttle Columbia.
- March 21 – Michael Donald is lynched in Mobile, Alabama.
- March 30 – President Ronald Reagan is shot in the chest outside a Washington, D.C., hotel by John Hinckley Jr. Two police officers and Press Secretary James Brady are also wounded.
- March 31 – The 53rd Academy Awards, hosted by Johnny Carson, are held at the Dorothy Chandler Pavilion in Los Angeles. Robert Redford's directorial debut, Ordinary People, wins four awards, including Best Picture and Best Director. David Lynch's The Elephant Man and Martin Scorsese's Raging Bull tie in receiving eight nominations each.

=== April ===
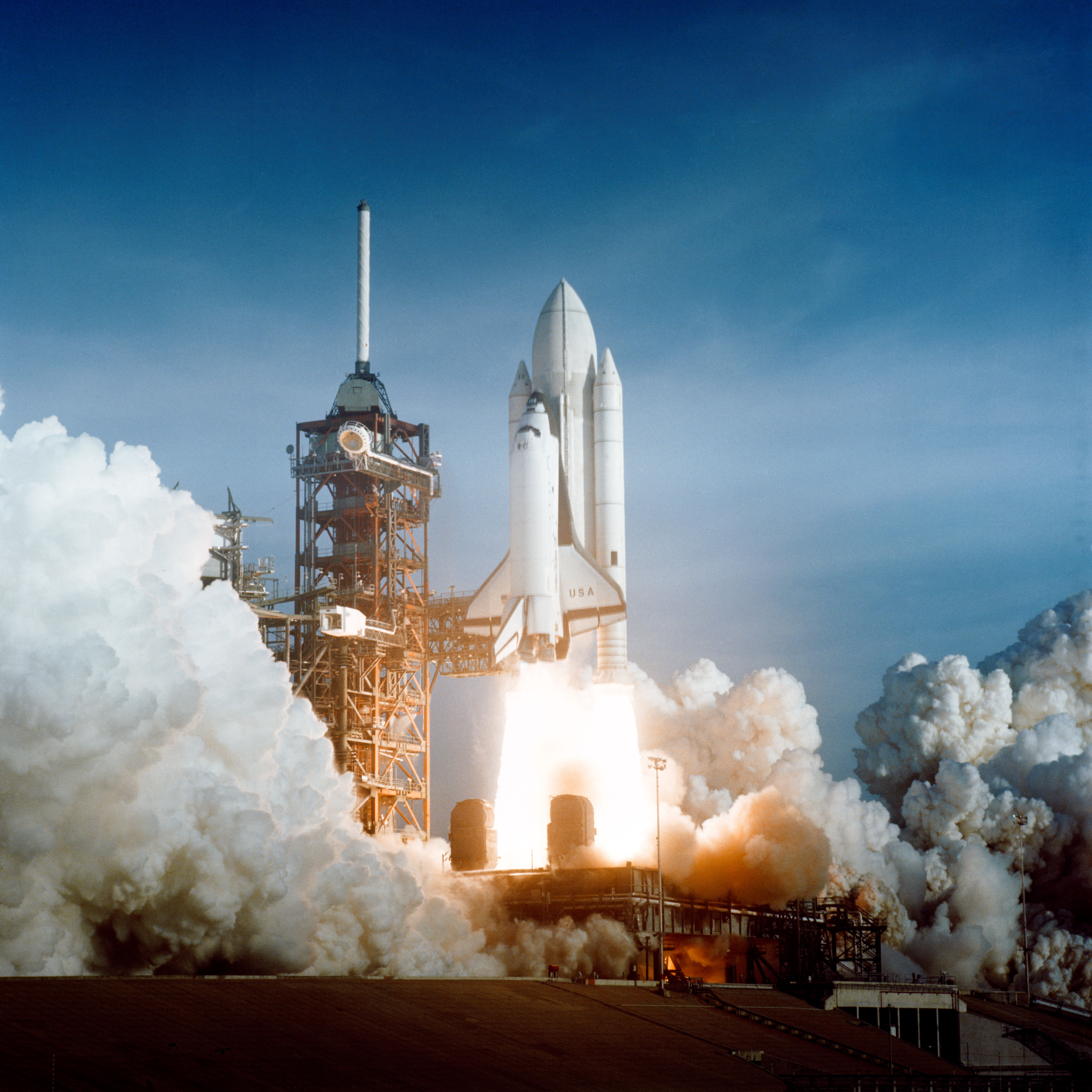
April 12: The first Space Shuttle launch

- April 12 – The Space Shuttle program: Space Shuttle Columbia (John Young, Robert Crippen) launches on the STS-1 mission, returning to Earth on April 14.
- April 18 – A Minor League Baseball game between the Rochester Red Wings and the Pawtucket Red Sox at McCoy Stadium in Pawtucket, Rhode Island, becomes the longest professional baseball game in history: 8 hours and 25 minutes/33 innings (the 33rd inning is not played until June 23).
- April 26 – The 5.9 M_{w} Westmorland earthquake shook the Imperial Valley of California with a maximum Mercalli intensity of VII (Very strong), causing $1–3 million in damage.

=== May ===
- May 11 – The Jamaican reggae singer Bob Marley dies at age 36 from cancer.
- May 15 – Donna Payant is murdered by serial killer Lemuel Smith, the first time a female correctional officer has been killed on-duty in the United States.

=== June ===
- June – The United States enters the severe early 1980s recession, exactly a year after the more minor 1980 recession ended; the unemployment rate is 7.2%
- June 5 – The Centers for Disease Control and Prevention report that five homosexual men in Los Angeles, California, have a rare form of pneumonia seen only in patients with weakened immune systems (the first recognized cases of AIDS).
- June 12
  - Major League Baseball goes on strike, forcing the cancellation of 38 percent of the schedule.
  - Raiders of the Lost Ark, directed by Steven Spielberg is released as the first film of the Indiana Jones film series.
- June 21 – Wayne Williams, a 23-year-old African American, is arrested and charged with the murders of two other African Americans. He is later accused of 28 others, in the Atlanta child murders.
- June 29 – Morris Edwin Robert, armed with a machine gun, holds hostages in the FBI section at the Atlanta, Georgia Federal Building. After three hours, the hostages are rescued and Robert is killed in a shootout with federal agents.

=== July ===
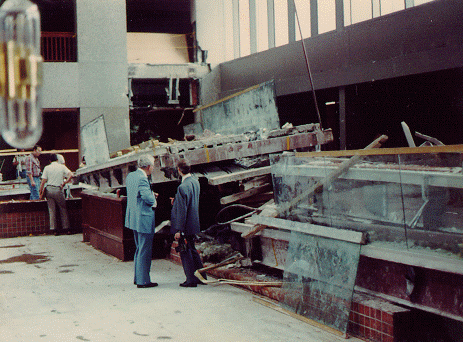
July 17: Hyatt Regency walkway collapse

- July 7 – President Reagan nominates the first woman, Sandra Day O'Connor, to the Supreme Court of the United States.
- July 8 – California Governor Jerry Brown, faced with a Mediterranean fruit fly infestation, chooses to delay the aerial spraying of malathion, in favor of continuing ground-based eradication efforts.
- July 9 – First release of Donkey Kong and debut of Mario.
- July 10 – Walt Disney Productions' 24th feature film, The Fox and the Hound, is released after a six-month delay due to the departure of Don Bluth and his animation team from the studio. The film receives mixed-to-positive reviews and is a box office success.
- July 17
  - Hyatt Regency walkway collapse: Two skywalks filled with people at the Hyatt Regency Hotel in Kansas City, Missouri collapse into a crowded atrium lobby, killing 114.
  - Israeli aircraft bomb Beirut, destroying multi-story apartment blocks containing the offices of PLO associated groups, killing approximately 300 civilians and resulting in worldwide condemnation and a U.S. embargo on the export of aircraft to Israel.
- July 27 – Adam Walsh, 6, is kidnapped from a Sears store in Hollywood, Florida.

=== August ===
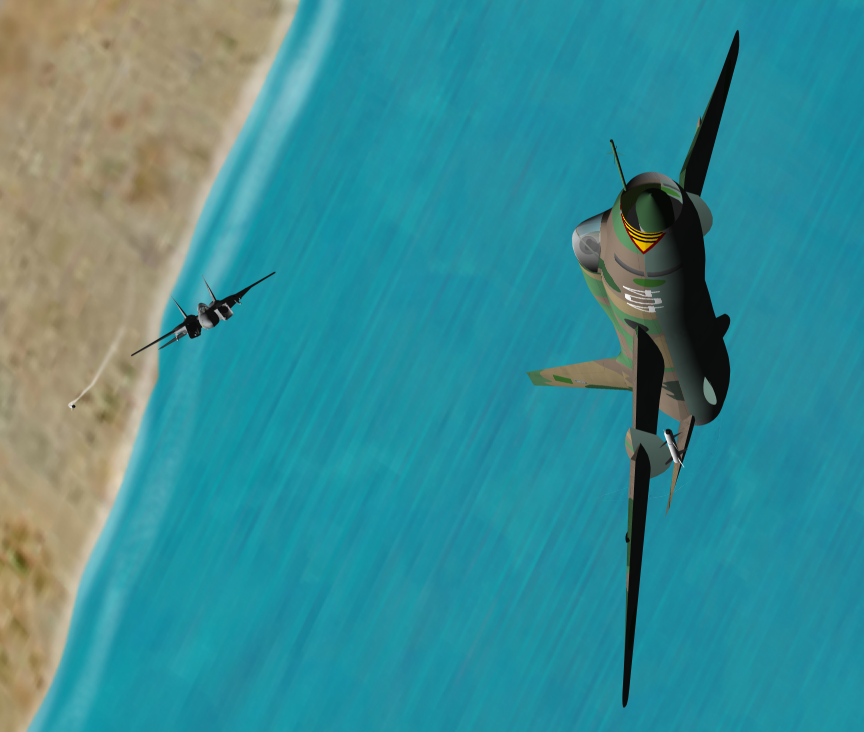
August 19: Gulf of Sidra incident

- August 1 – MTV (Music Television) is launched on cable television in the United States.
- August 5 – President Ronald Reagan fires 11,359 striking air-traffic controllers who ignored his order for them to return to work.
- August 7 – The Washington Star ceases publication after 128 years.
- August 9 – Major League Baseball resumes from the strike with the All-Star Game in Cleveland's Municipal Stadium.
- August 10 – Exactly two weeks after his disappearance, the severed head of 6-year-old Hollywood, Florida native Adam Walsh is found in a canal in Vero Beach, Florida; to this day the rest of the boy's body has never been recovered.
- August 12 – The original Model 5150 IBM PC (with a 4.77 MHz Intel 8088 processor) is released in the United States at a base price of $1,565.
- August 19
  - Gulf of Sidra incident (1981): Libyan leader Muammar al-Gaddafi sends 2 Sukhoi Su-22 fighter jets to intercept 2 U.S. fighters over the Gulf of Sidra. The American jets destroy the Libyan fighters.
  - President Ronald Reagan appoints the first female U.S. Supreme Court Justice, Sandra Day O'Connor.
- August 24 – Mark David Chapman is sentenced to 20 years to life in prison, after being convicted of murdering John Lennon in Manhattan eight months earlier.
- August 31 – A bomb explodes at the U.S. Air Force base in Ramstein, West Germany, injuring 20 people.

=== September ===
- September 10 – Picasso's painting "Guernica" is moved from New York City to Madrid.
- September 11 – A small plane crashes into the Swing Auditorium in San Bernardino, California, damaging the venue beyond repair.
- September 15 – The John Bull becomes the oldest operable steam locomotive in the world, at 150 years old, when it operates under its own power outside Washington, DC.
- September 17 – Ric Flair defeats Dusty Rhodes to win his first World Heavyweight Wrestling Championship in Kansas City.
- September 19 – Simon & Garfunkel perform The Concert in Central Park, a free concert in New York in front of approximately half a million people.
- September 25
  - Sandra Day O'Connor takes her seat as the first female justice of the U.S. Supreme Court.
  - The Rolling Stones begin their Tattoo You tour at JFK Stadium in Philadelphia.

=== October ===
- October 28
  - The thrash metal band Metallica forms in Los Angeles.
  - The Los Angeles Dodgers defeat the New York Yankees, 4 games to 2, to win their fifth World Series Title.

=== November ===
- November 12 – STS-2: Space Shuttle Columbia (Joe Engle, Richard Truly) lifts off for its second mission.
- November 16 – Luke and Laura marry on the U.S. soap opera General Hospital; it is the highest-rated hour in daytime television history.
- November 23 – Iran-Contra scandal: Ronald Reagan signs the top secret National Security Decision Directive 17 (NSDD-17), authorizing the Central Intelligence Agency to recruit and support Contra rebels in Nicaragua.
- November 30 – Cold War: In Geneva, representatives from the United States and the Soviet Union begin negotiating intermediate-range nuclear weapon reductions in Europe (the meetings end inconclusively on Thursday, December 17).

=== December ===
- December 5 – American general James L. Dozier is kidnapped in Verona by the Italian Red Brigades.
- December 8 – The No. 21 Mine explosion in Whitwell, Tennessee kills 13.
- December 11 – Boxing: Muhammad Ali loses to Trevor Berbick; this proved to be Ali's last-ever fight.
- December 28 – The first American test-tube baby, Elizabeth Jordan Carr, is born in Norfolk, Virginia.

=== Ongoing ===
- Cold War (1947–1991)
- Iran hostage crisis (1979–1981)
- Early 1980s recession (1981–1982)
- The Wayne Chicken Show (since 1981), held in Wayne, Nebraska

== Births ==
=== January ===
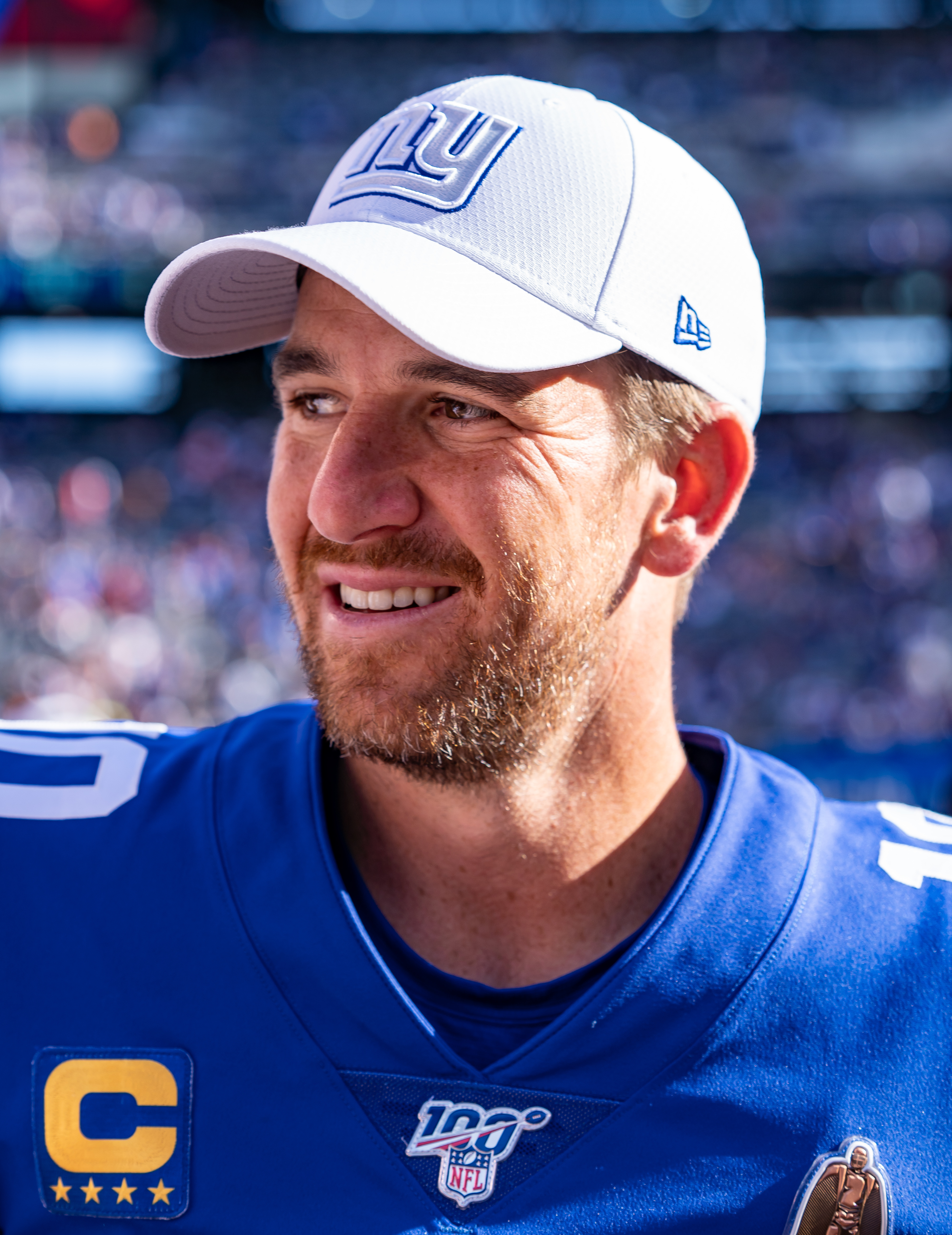
Eli Manning

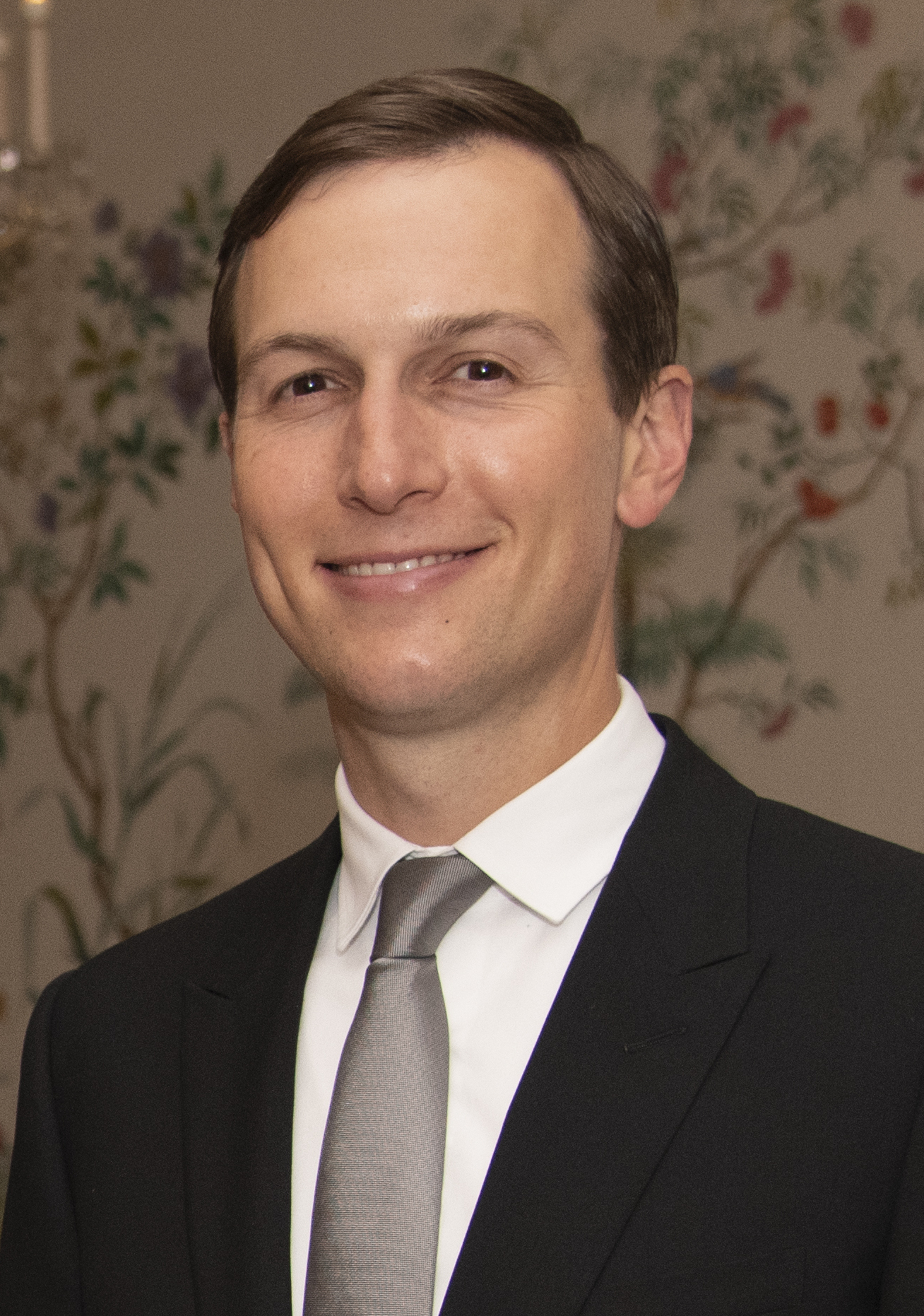
Jared Kushner

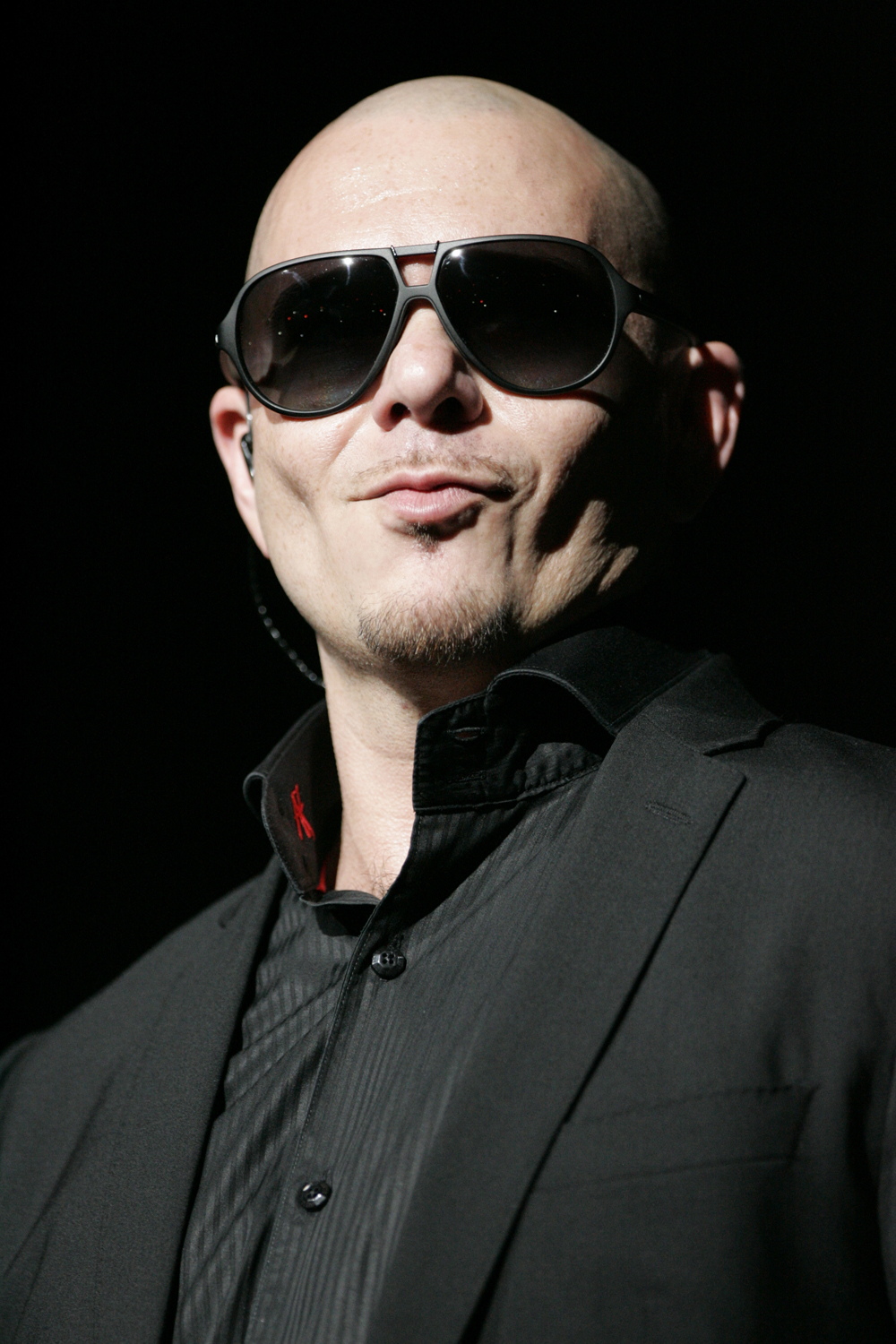
Pitbull

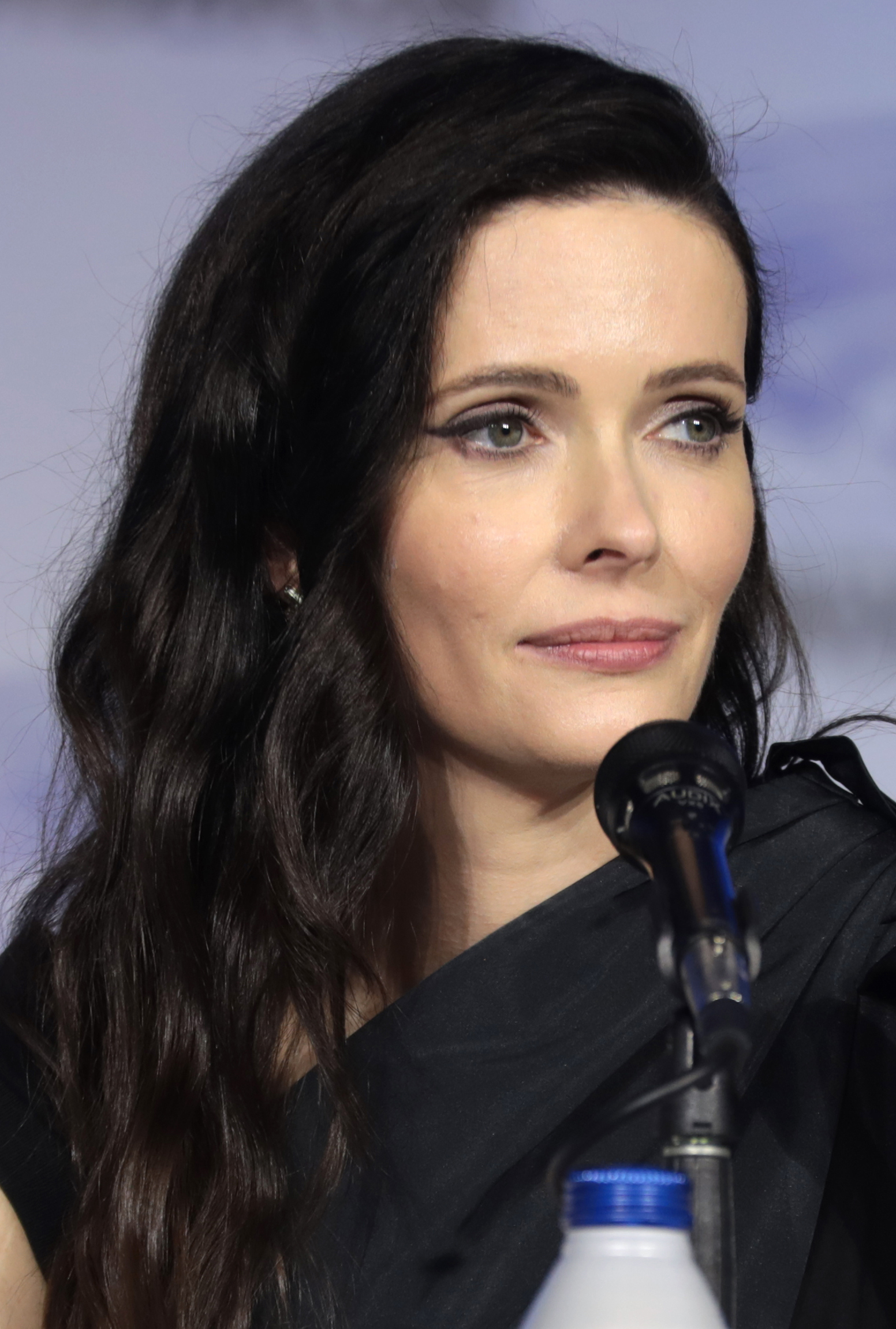
Elizabeth Tulloch

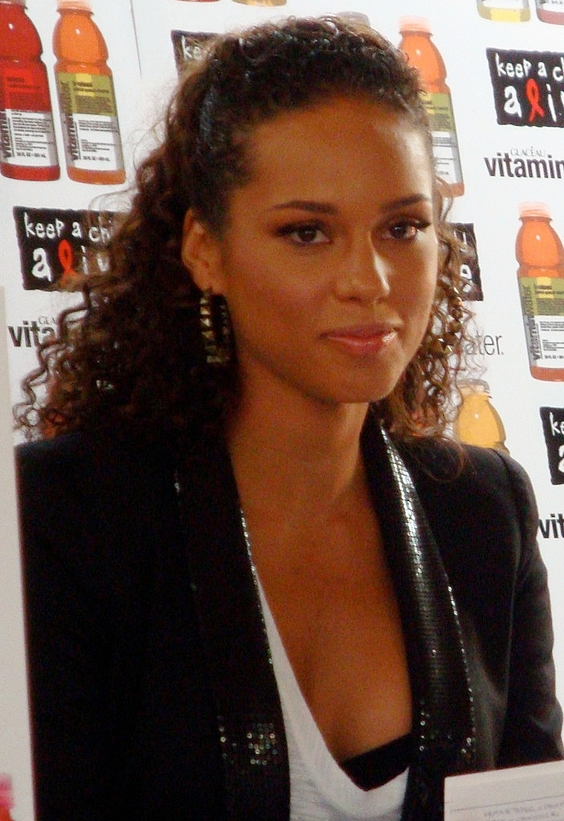
Alicia Keys

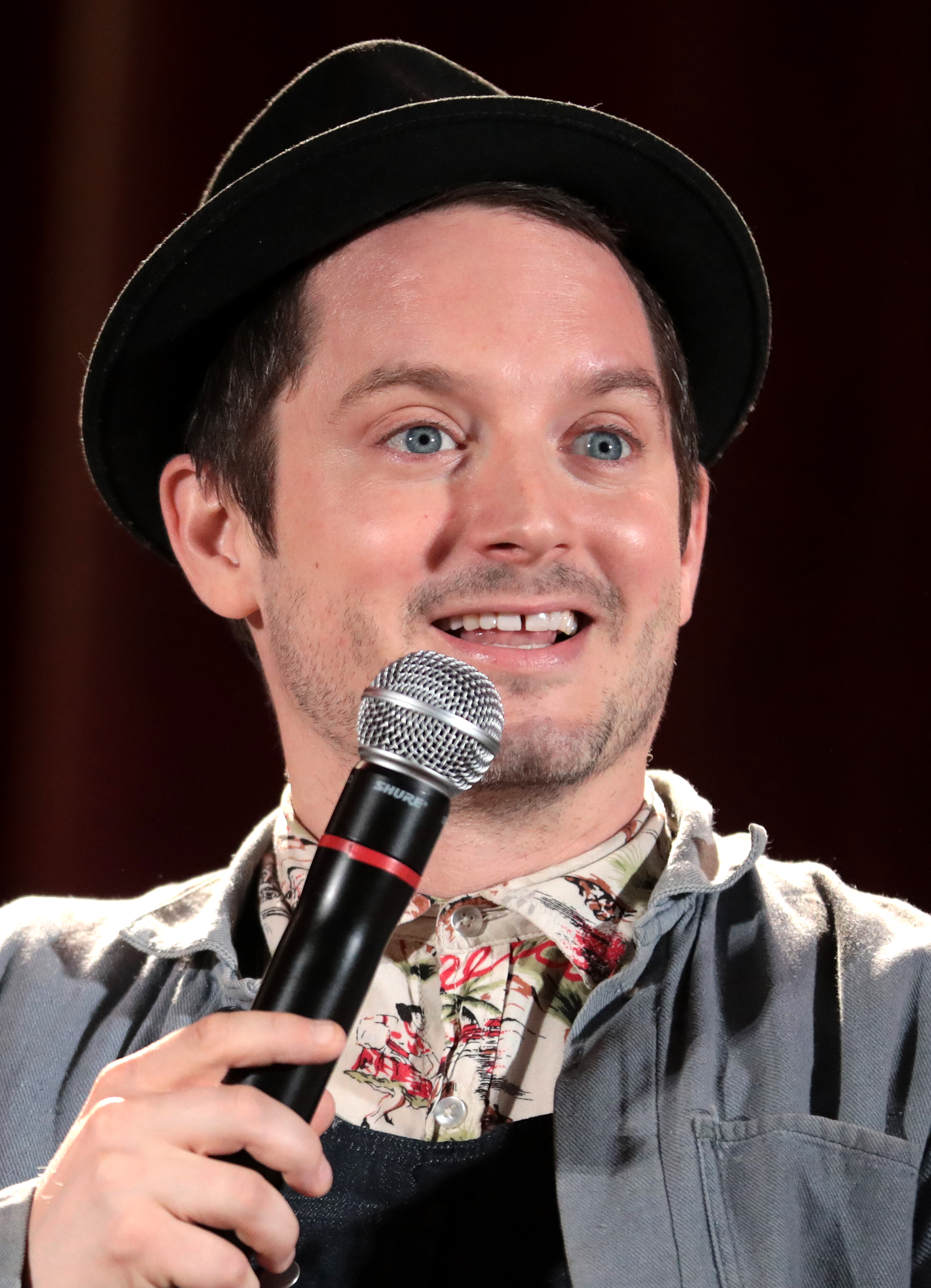
Elijah Wood

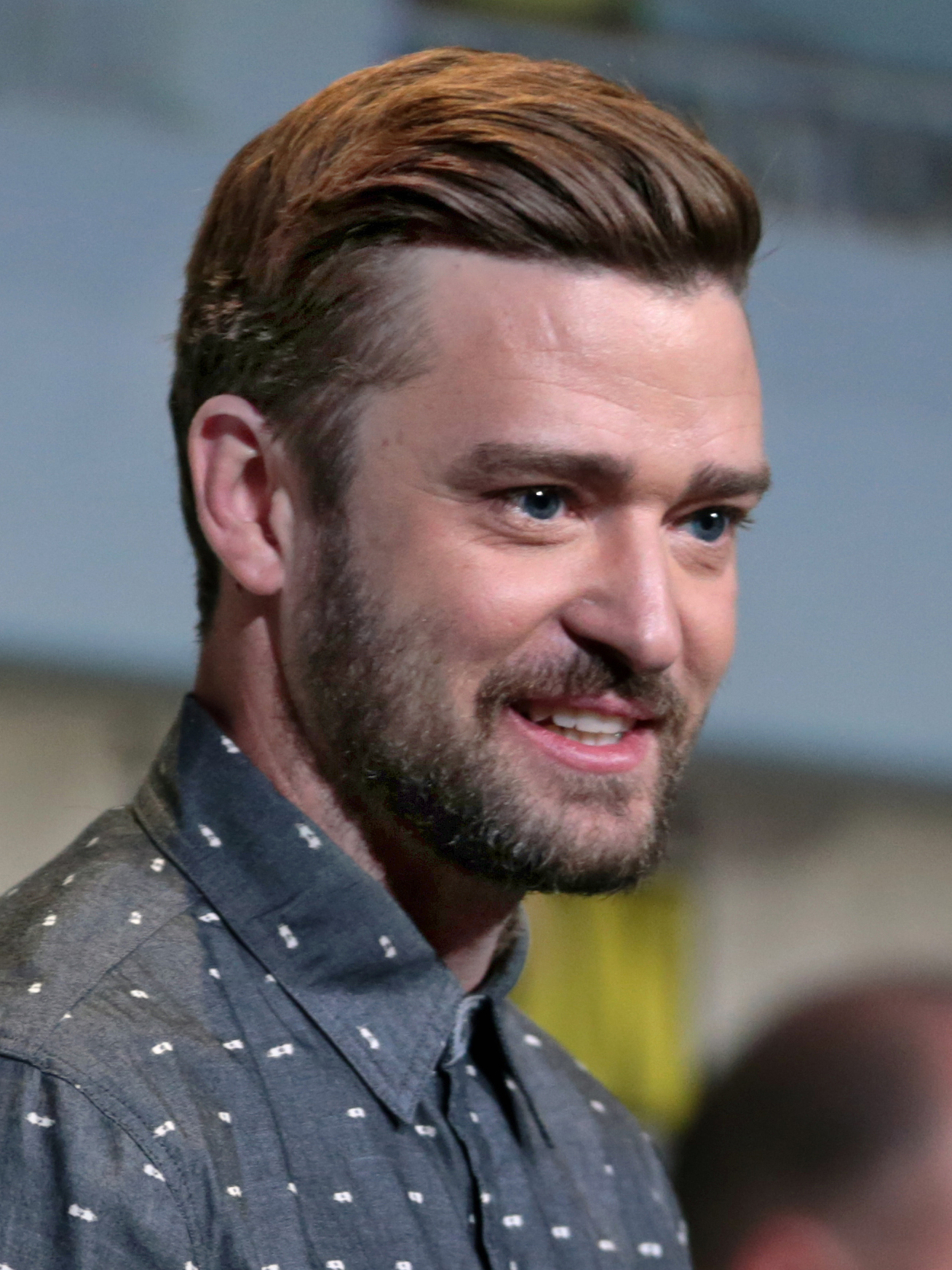
Justin Timberlake

- January 1
  - Kelly Fremon Craig, screenwriter, producer, and film director
  - Eden Riegel, actress
- January 2
  - JT Daly, musician, producer, songwriter, and visual artist, and frontman for Paper Route
  - Kirk Hinrich, basketball player
- January 3 – Eli Manning, football player
- January 4
  - Alicia Garza, civil rights activist and co-founder of Black Lives Matter
  - Aaron Schwartz, actor
- January 5
  - Chris Drake, tennis player
  - Brooklyn Sudano, actress
- January 6
  - Ejiro Evero, English-born football player and coach
  - Betty Gabriel, actress
  - Camila Grey, singer/songwriter and guitarist
  - Mike Jones, rapper
  - Mobetta, jazz trumpeter, producer, and composer
- January 7
  - Marquis Daniels, basketball player
  - Jinxx, guitarist and member of Black Veil Brides
- January 8 – Genevieve Cortese, actress
- January 9
  - Sam Arora, politician
  - Nate Boyer, football player and Army Green Beret
  - Cedric Cobbs, football player
  - Caroline Lufkin, singer
- January 10
  - Matt Brown, mixed martial artist
  - Brian Joo, R&B singer
  - Jared Kushner, investor
- January 11 – Mary Beth Decker, model and television personality
- January 12 – Quentin Griffin, football player
- January 13
  - Reggie Brown, football player
  - Shad Gaspard, wrestler (d. 2020)
- January 14 – Trieste Kelly Dunn, actress
- January 15
  - Elvin Ayala, boxer
  - Charleene Closshey, actress, musician, composer, and producer
  - Alex Cremidan, baseball player
  - Howie Day, singer/songwriter
  - Pitbull, hip-hop musician and record producer
- January 16 – Kurt Sauer, ice hockey player
- January 17
  - Flash Brown, pornographic actor, model, and basketball player
  - Scott Mechlowicz, actor
  - Ray J, rapper and singer
- January 19 – Elizabeth Tulloch, actress
- January 20
  - John Baker, baseball player
  - Annie Black, politician
  - Erika Davies, jazz vocalist and actress
  - Jason Richardson, basketball player
  - Clarke Tucker, politician
- January 21
  - Amanda Aday, actress
  - Damane Duckett, football player
  - Josh Revak, politician
  - Josh Riley, lawyer and politician
- January 22
  - Chantelle Anderson, basketball player
  - Cameron Echols, basketball player
  - Willa Ford, singer, television hostess, and actress
  - Beverley Mitchell, actress
  - Ben Moody, guitarist
  - Raymond Raposa, singer/songwriter and frontman for Castanets (d. 2022)
- January 23
  - Dan Antoniuk, soccer player
  - Nathan Baskerville, politician
  - Chuckie Campbell, musician, poet, fiction writer, editor, publisher, and educator
  - Miss Eighty 6, rapper
- January 24 – Carrie Coon, actress
- January 25 – Alicia Keys, singer, pianist and actress
- January 26 – Ronald Dupree, basketball player
- January 27 – Gorilla Zoe, rapper
- January 28 – Elijah Wood, actor and producer
- January 29 – Jonny Lang, musician
- January 30 – Jonathan Bender, basketball player
- January 31 – Justin Timberlake, singer/songwriter, actor, record producer, and member of NSYNC

=== February ===
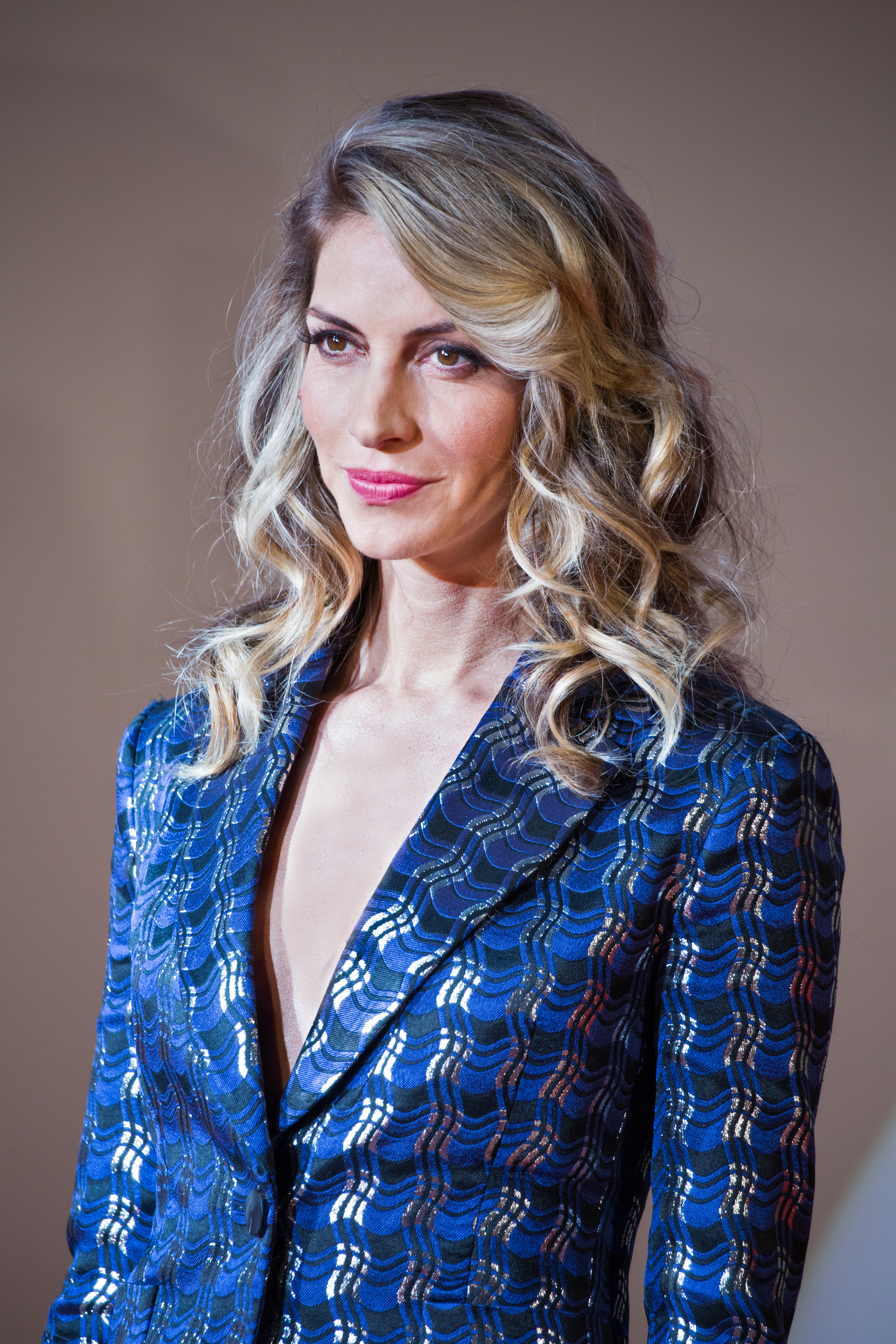
Dawn Olivieri

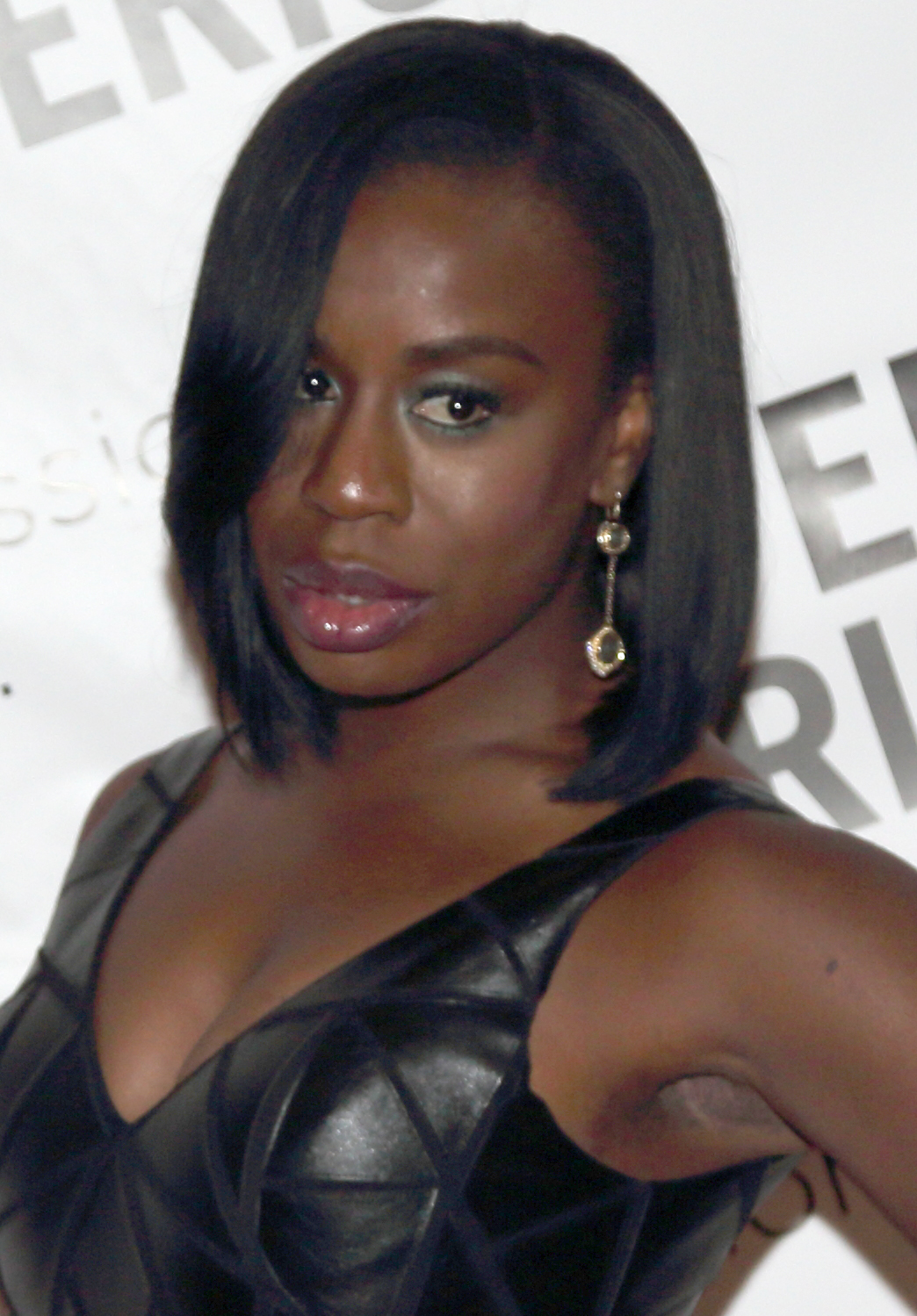
Uzo Aduba

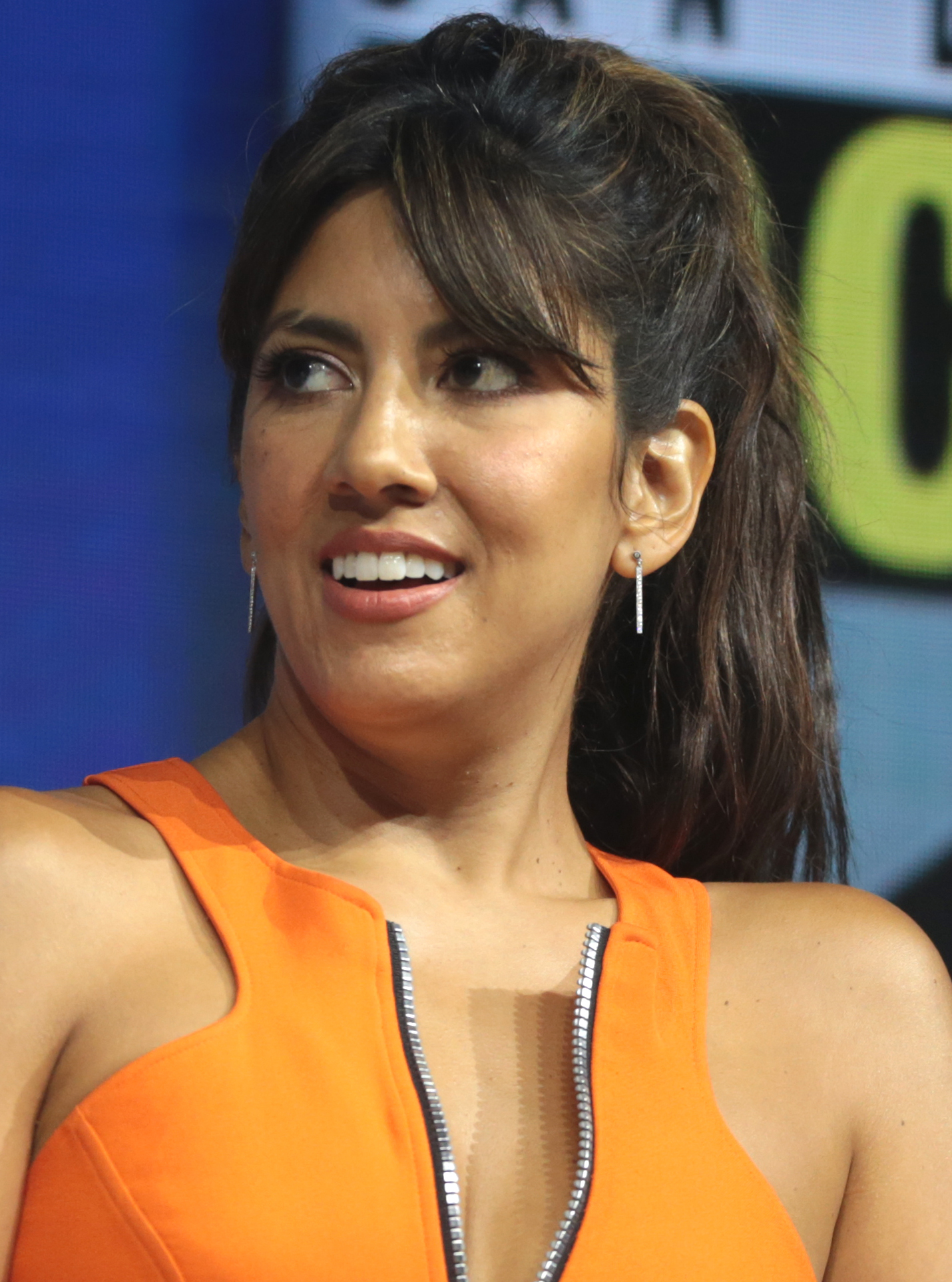
Stephanie Beatriz

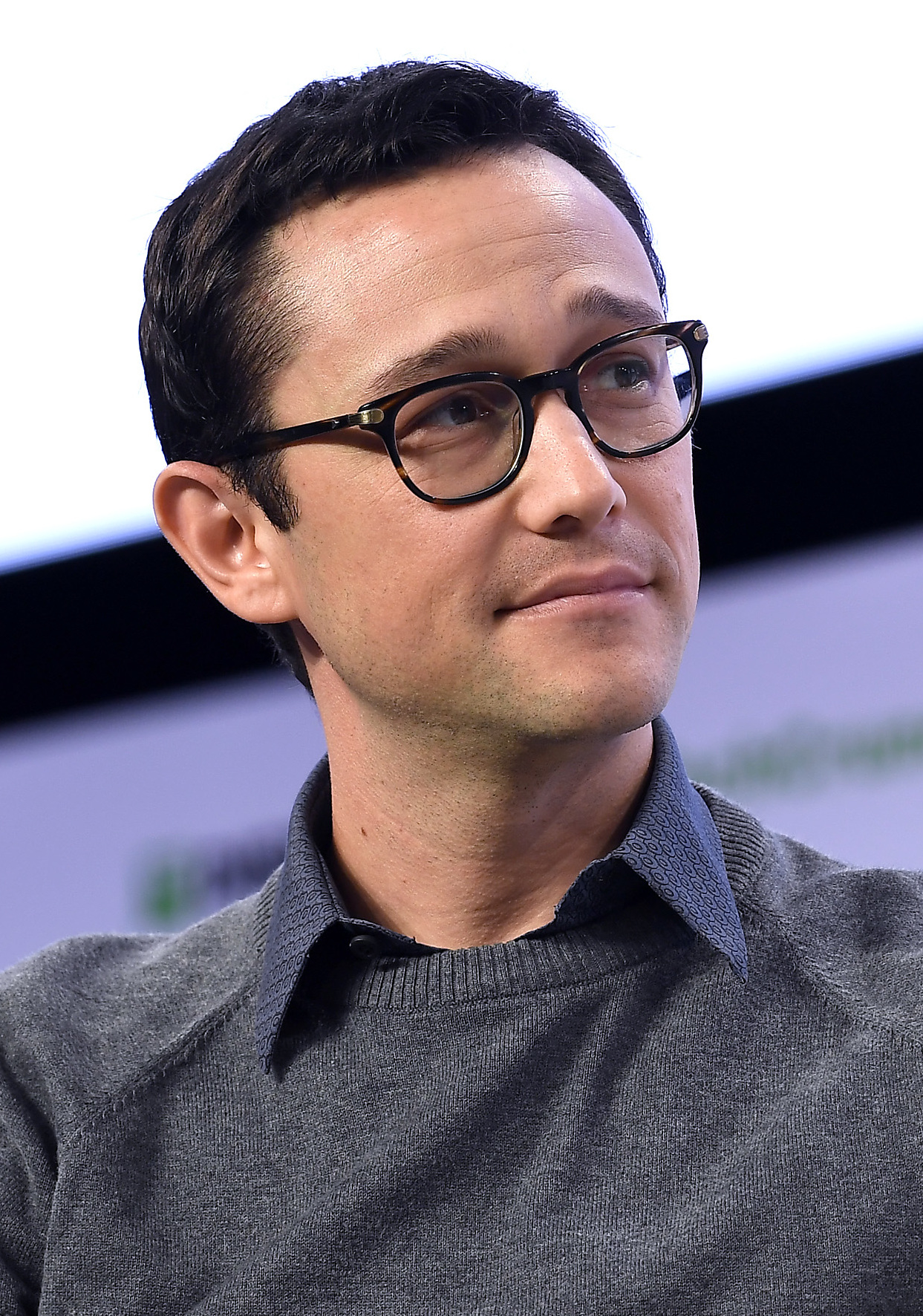
Joseph Gordon-Levitt

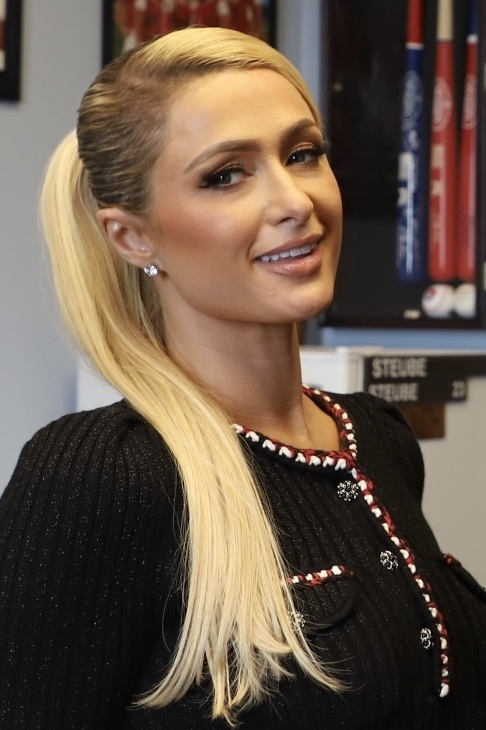
Paris Hilton

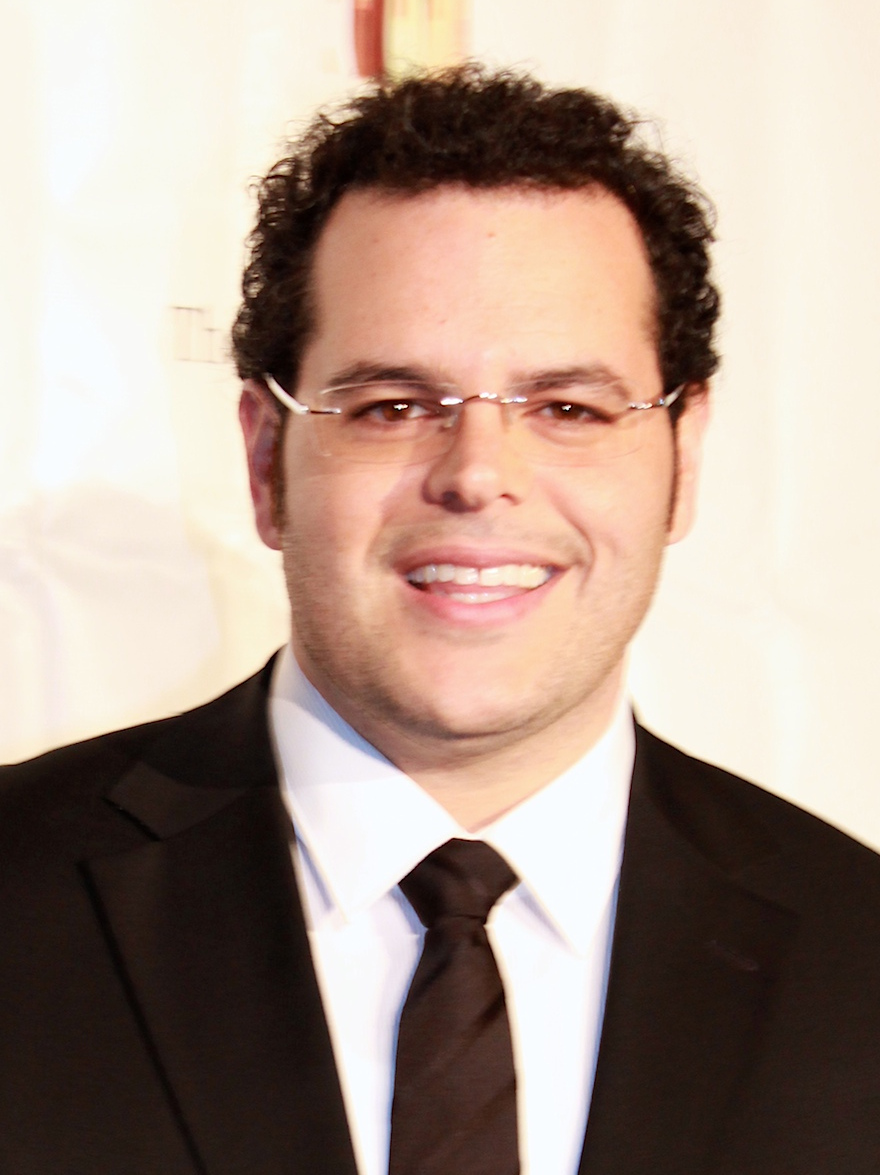
Josh Gad

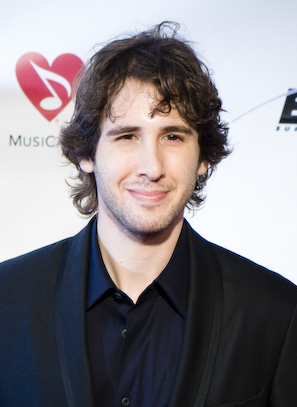
Josh Groban

- February 1
  - Bayard Elfvin, soccer player
  - John Gemberling, actor and comedian
  - Gina Ortiz Jones, politician
- February 2
  - Lance Allred, basketball player
  - Nathan Barnatt, actor, comedian, dancer, YouTuber, and filmmaker
  - Josh Kaul, politician
  - Emily Rose, actress
- February 3
  - Kris Dielman, football player
  - Alisa Reyes, actress
  - Ben Wikler, politician
- February 4 – Dennis Dottin-Carter, football player
- February 5
  - Jarvis Dortch, politician
  - Nora Zehetner, actress
- February 6
  - Ricky Barnes, golfer
  - Calum Best, TV personality
  - Alison Haislip, actress and TV personality
- February 7 – Jim Parrack, actor
- February 8 – Dawn Olivieri, actress
- February 9 – The Rev, drummer for Avenged Sevenfold (d. 2009)
- February 10
  - Uzo Aduba, actress
  - Stephanie Beatriz, actress
  - Eric Dill, singer/songwriter
  - Mike Spreitzer, guitarist for DevilDriver (2004–2024)
- February 11
  - Jake Eaton, football player and athletic director
  - Kelly Rowland, singer and actress
- February 13 – Joshua Deahl, judge
- February 15
  - Matt Hoopes, guitarist and singer/songwriter, (Relient K)
  - Jenna Morasca, TV personality
  - Olivia, singer/songwriter and actress
- February 17
  - Sean Michael Becker, director, producer, and editor
  - T. J. Duckett, football player
  - Joseph Gordon-Levitt, actor, director, producer and writer
  - Paris Hilton, model and socialite
- February 18
  - Jameel Dumas, football player
  - Kamasi Washington, saxophonist
- February 19
  - Beth Ditto, singer/songwriter and actress
  - Blake Elliott, football player
  - Jocko Sims, actor
- February 20
  - Majandra Delfino, actress
  - Cody Donovan, mixed martial artist and Brazilian jiu-jitsu practitioner
  - Fred Jackson, football player
  - Adrian Lamo, convicted computer hacker (died 2018)
  - Chris Thile, mandolinist
- February 21
  - Katie Edwards-Walpole, politician
  - Jason Jorjani, philosopher and writer
- February 23
  - Josh Gad, actor, comedian, and singer
  - Paleo, singer/songwriter
  - Charles Tillman, American football player
- February 24 – Rob Bowen, baseball player
- February 25 – Oliver Celestin, football safety player
- February 26
  - PJ Bianco, songwriter and record producer
  - Kertus Davis, race car driver
  - Demetrius Grosse, actor and producer
  - Maria Sansone, journalist and Internet personality
- February 27
  - Josh Groban, singer
  - Nick Langworthy, politician
- February 28
  - Brian Bannister, baseball player
  - Erik Demaine, professor of Computer Science at MIT and former child prodigy

=== March ===
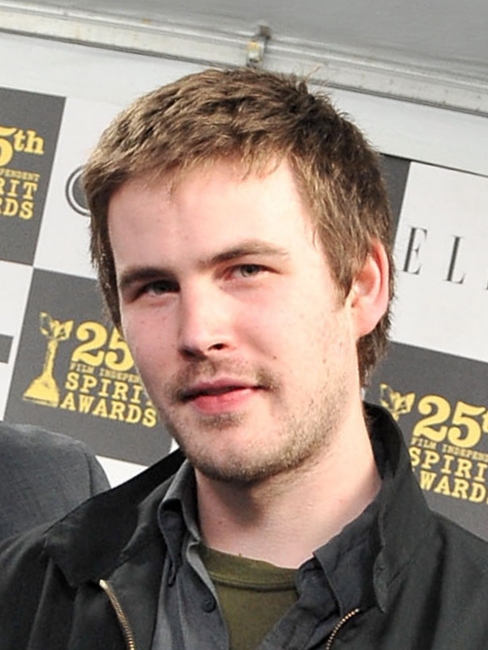
Zach Cregger

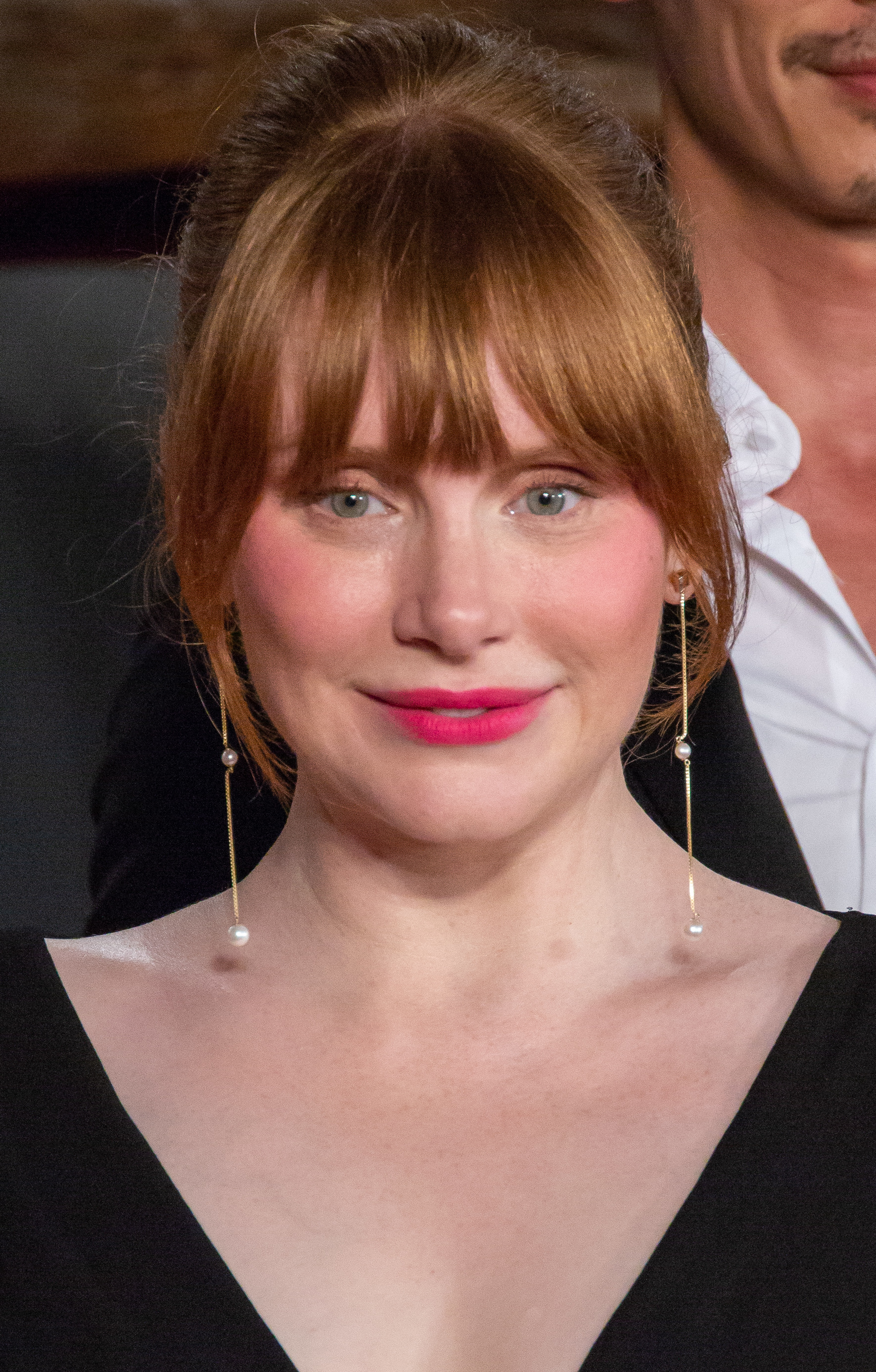
Bryce Dallas Howard

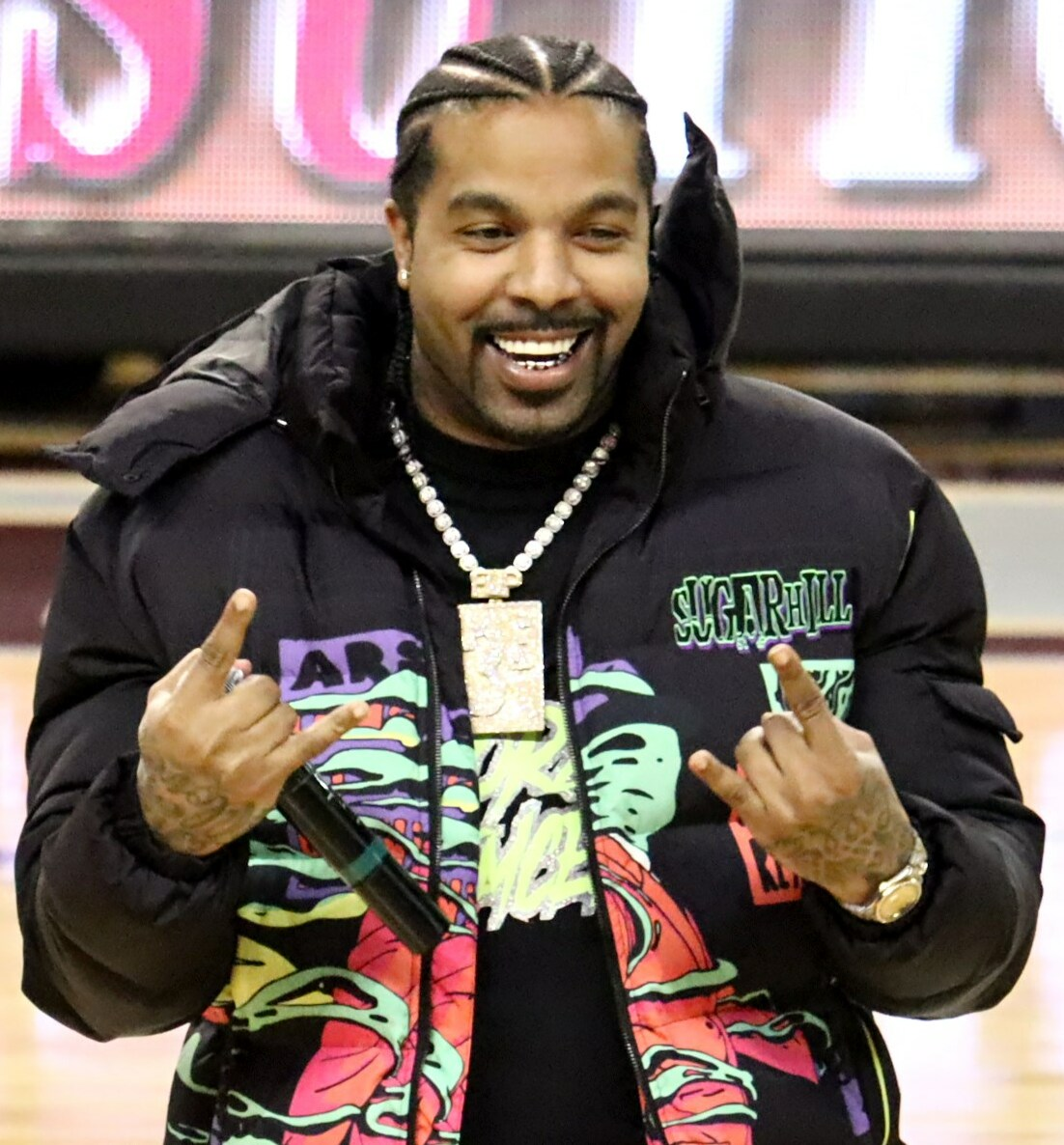
Lil' Flip

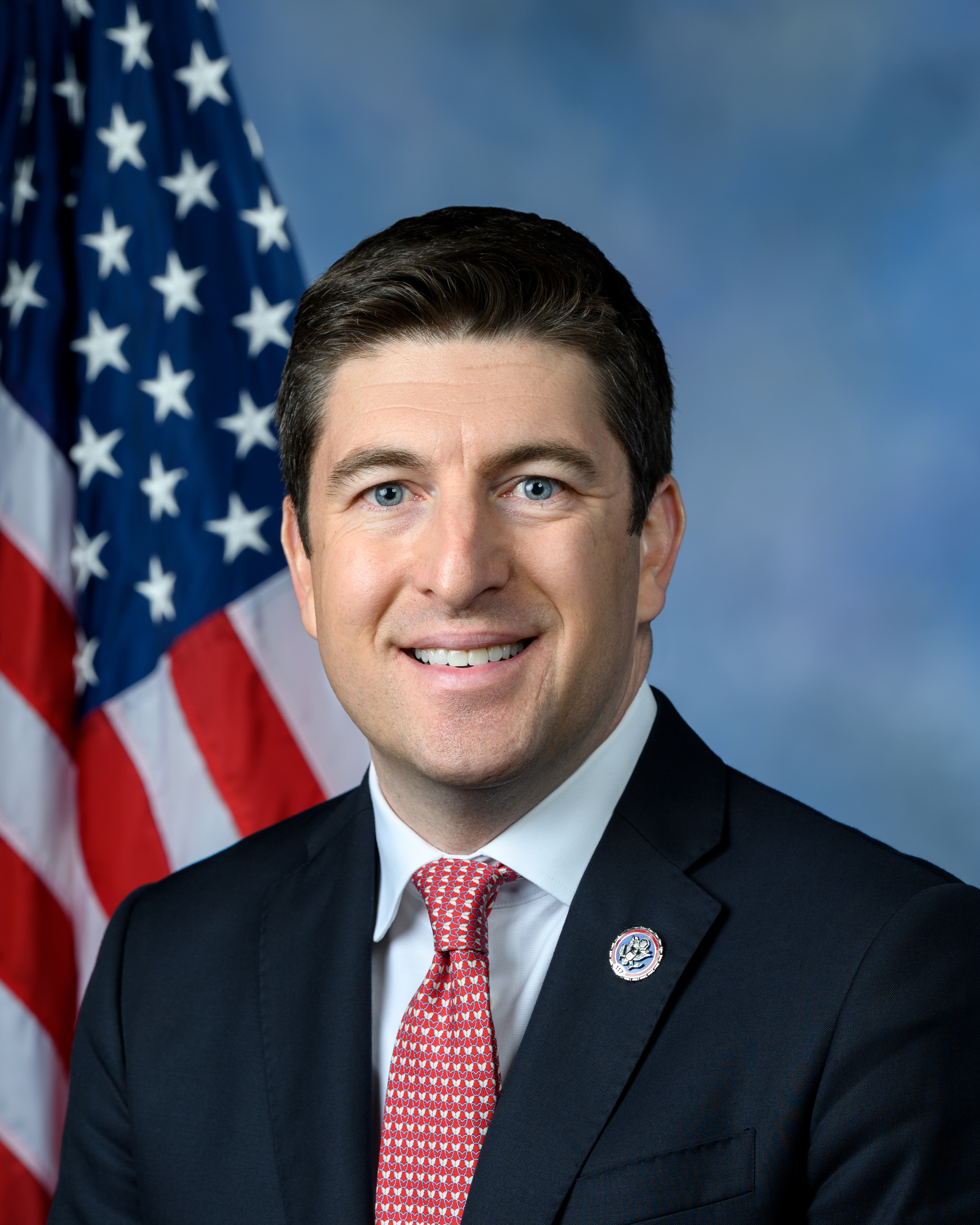
Bryan Steil

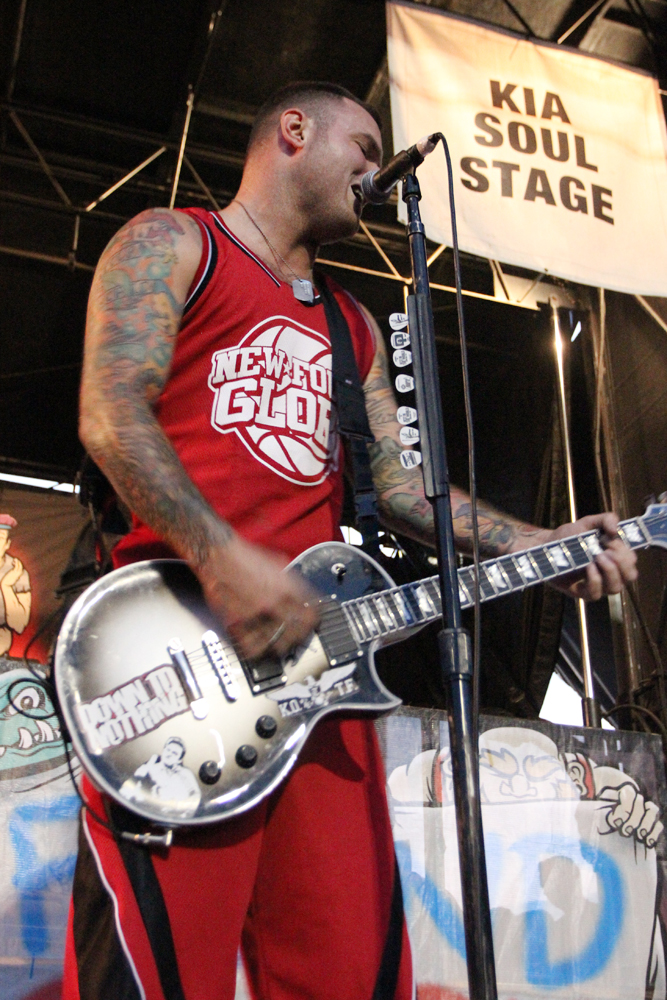
Chad Gilbert

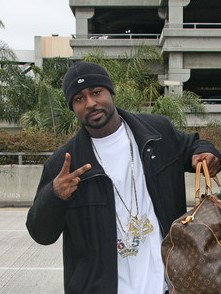
Young Buck

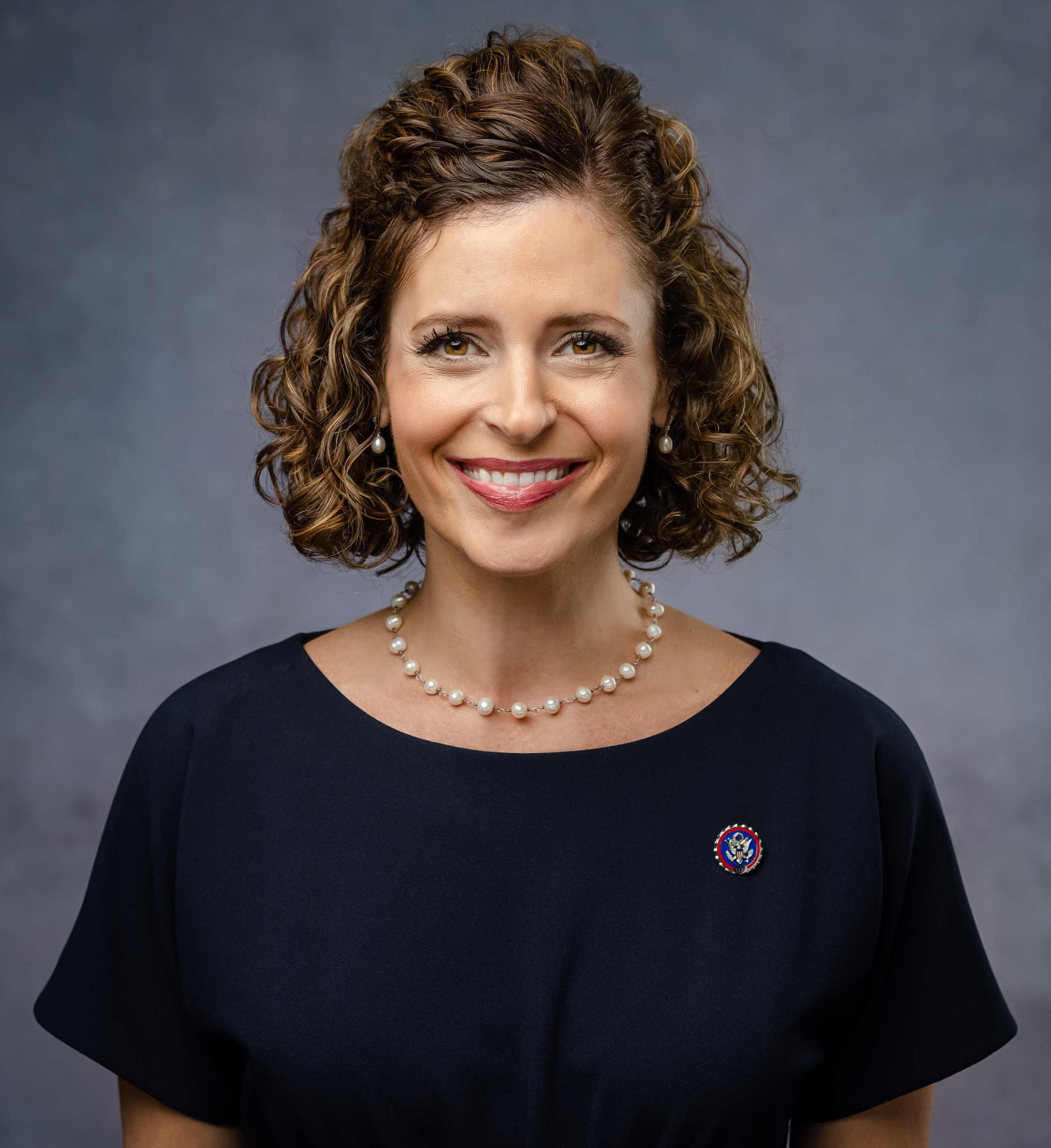
Julia Letlow

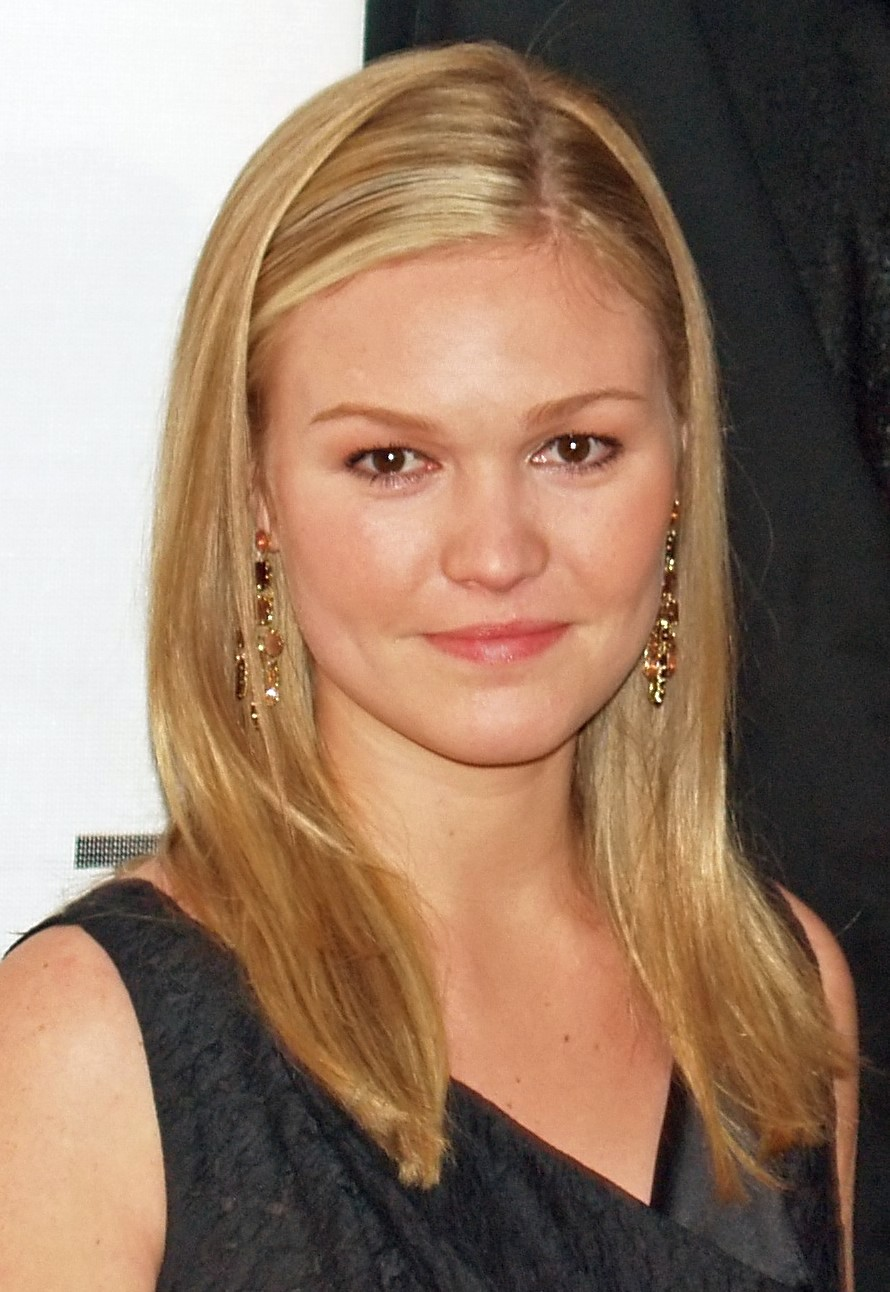
Julia Stiles

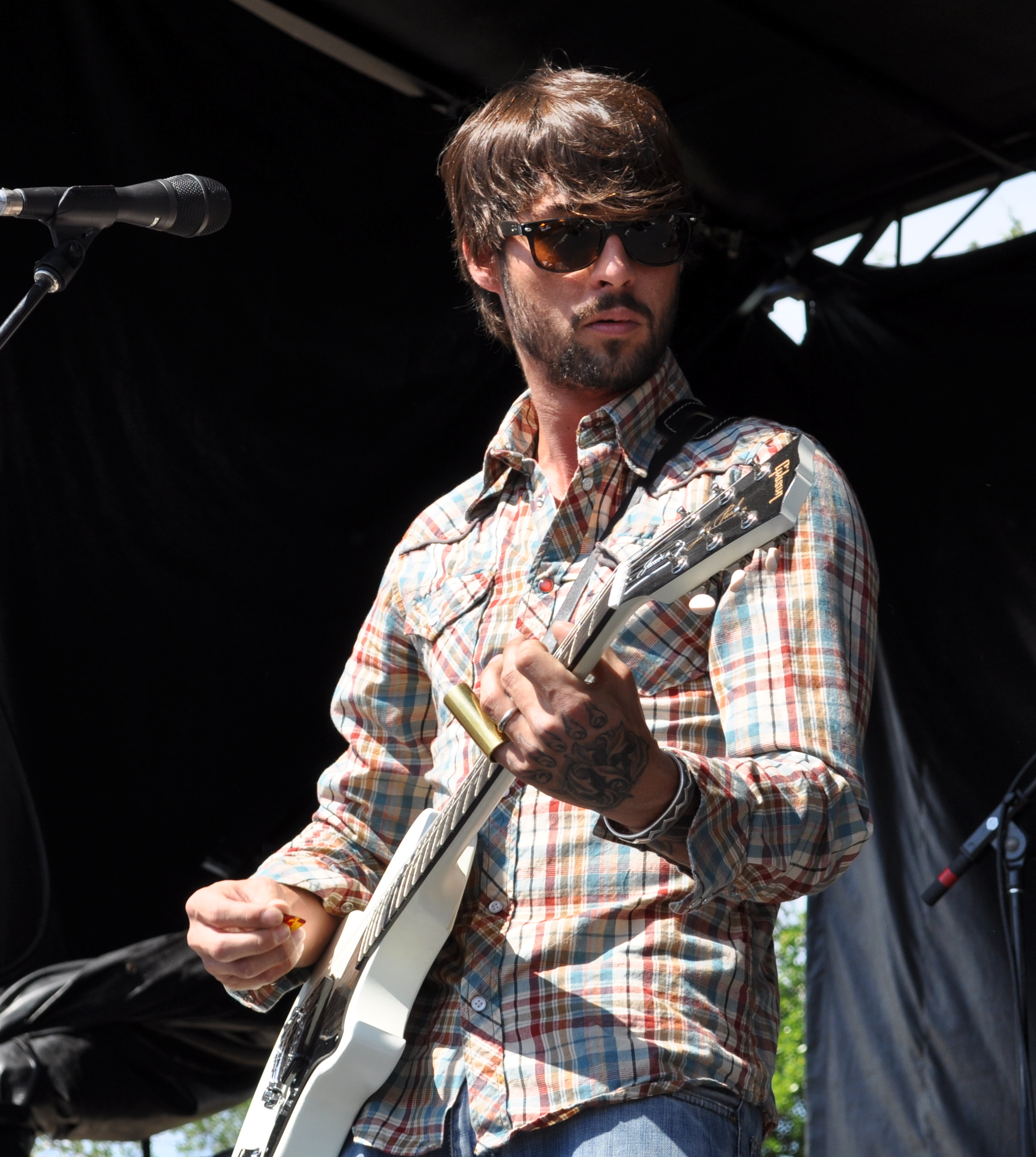
Ryan Bingham

- March 1
  - Zach Cregger, actor, comedian, and filmmaker
  - Adam LaVorgna, actor
  - Brad Winchester, ice hockey player
- March 2
  - Lance Cade, wrestler (d. 2010)
  - Bryce Dallas Howard, actress
  - Danielle Moné Truitt, actress
- March 3
  - David Bailey, basketball player
  - Ed Carpenter, race car driver
  - Lil' Flip, rapper
  - Bryan Steil, politician
- March 4 – James Gallagher, politician
- March 5 – Chris Arreola, boxer
- March 6 – Ellen Muth, actress
- March 8 – B. Dolan, rapper, spoken word artist, activist, screenwriter, and composer
- March 9
  - Antonio Bryant, football player
  - Chad Gilbert, guitarist for New Found Glory (d. 2026)
- March 10 – Kristen Maloney, Olympic gymnast
- March 11
  - David Anders, actor
  - Lee Evans, football player
  - LeToya Luckett, singer
- March 13 – Mike Avilés, baseball player
- March 14 – Bobby Jenks, baseball player and coach (d. 2025)
- March 15 – Young Buck, rapper
- March 16
  - Danny Brown, rapper and songwriter
  - Curtis Granderson, baseball player
  - Julia Letlow, politician and widow of congressman-elect Luke Letlow
- March 17 – Kyle Korver, basketball player
- March 18
  - Amir Abdur-Rahim, basketball player and coach (d. 2024)
  - Vanessa Lee Evigan, actress
- March 19 – Benny Fine, co-founder of React Media, LLC
- March 20
  - Jake Hoffman, actor, director, and writer
  - Levar Stoney, politician, mayor of Richmond, Virginia
- March 21 – Juju Castaneda, media personality, author, actress, and businesswoman
- March 22
  - Will Ainsworth, politician, 31st Lieutenant Governor of Alabama
  - Tiffany Dupont, actress
  - MIMS, rapper
- March 23
  - Jenn Brown, sports broadcaster and television host
  - Erin Crocker, race car driver and broadcaster
  - Brett Young, country singer/songwriter
- March 24
  - Mike Adams, football player
  - Mike Doss, football player
  - Philip Winchester, actor
- March 25 – Casey Neistat, YouTube personality
- March 27
  - Cory Butner, bobsledder
  - Cesilie Carlton, diver
  - Carey Davis, football player
  - Keith Rodden, NASCAR crew chief
- March 28
  - Lindsay Frimodt, model
  - Michael Sarver, musician
  - Julia Stiles, actress
- March 29
  - Jasmine Crockett, politician
  - Megan Hilty, actress and singer
  - PJ Morton, musician, singer, and producer
  - Willie Taylor, singer/songwriter, record producer, and member of Day26
- March 30
  - Jammal Brown, football player
  - Jon DiSalvatore, ice hockey player
  - Katy Mixon, actress
- March 31
  - Ryan Bingham, actor and singer/songwriter
  - Mark Ellebracht, politician
  - Reggie Moore, American-born Angolan basketball player (d. 2023)

=== April ===
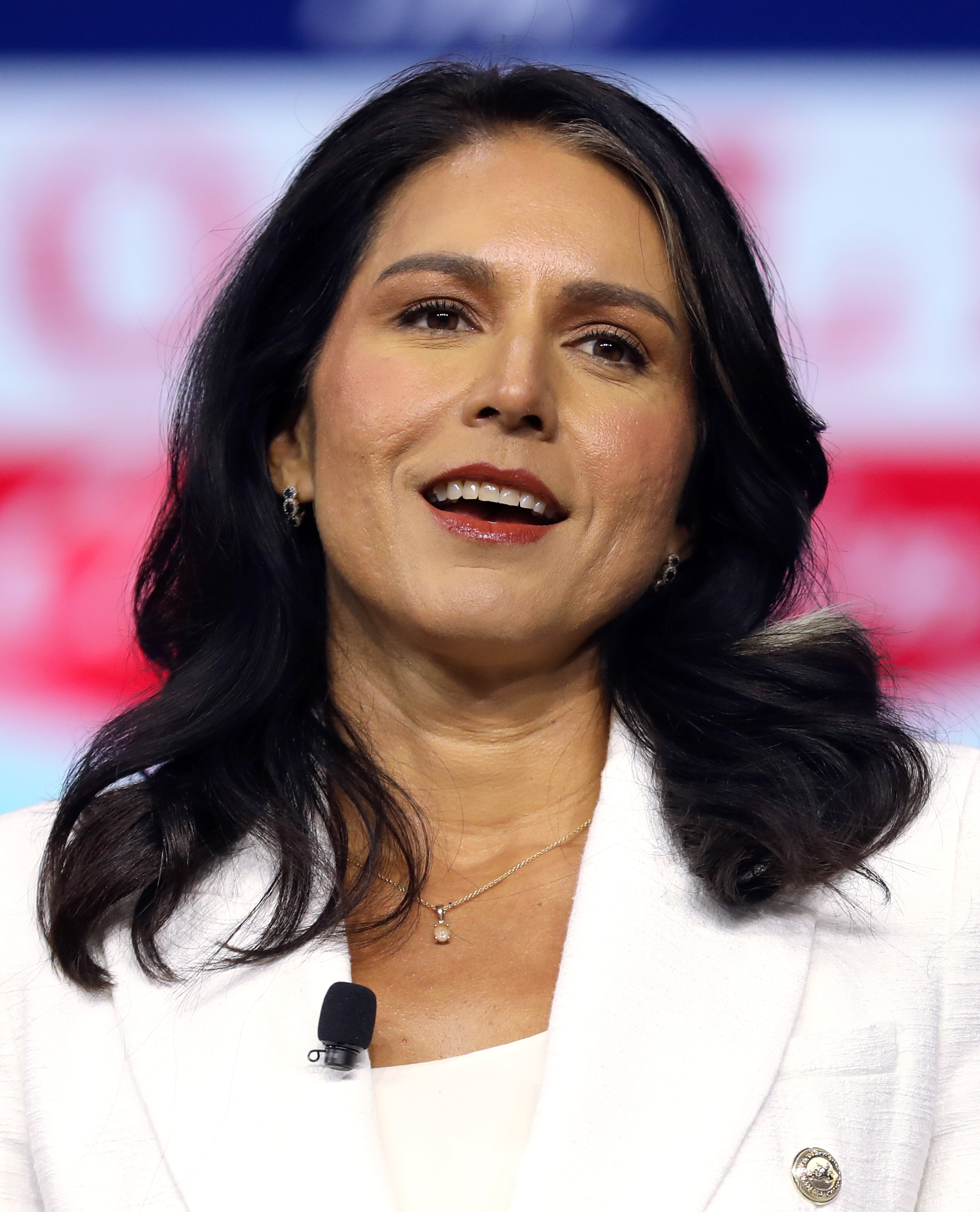
Tulsi Gabbard

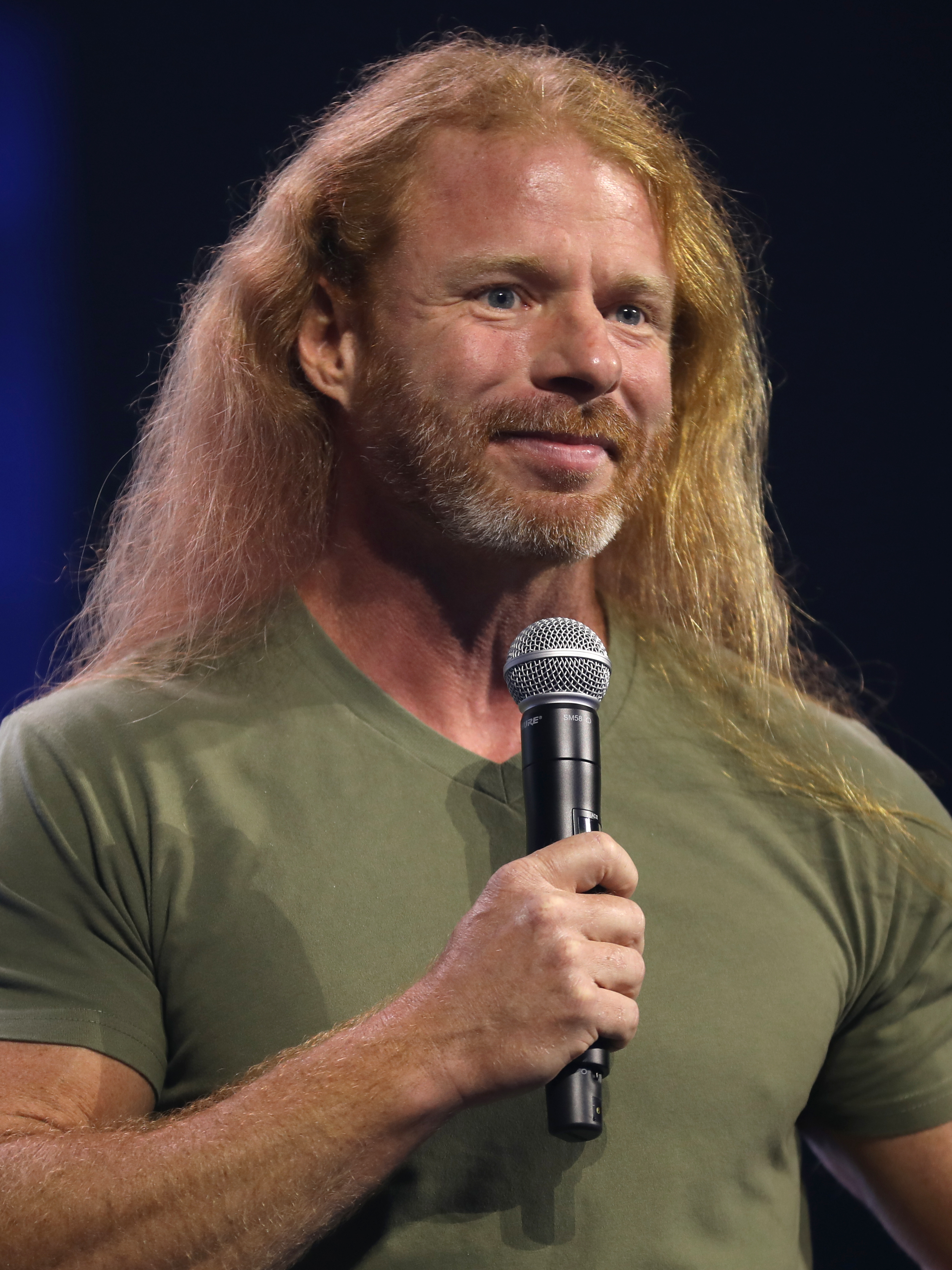
JP Sears

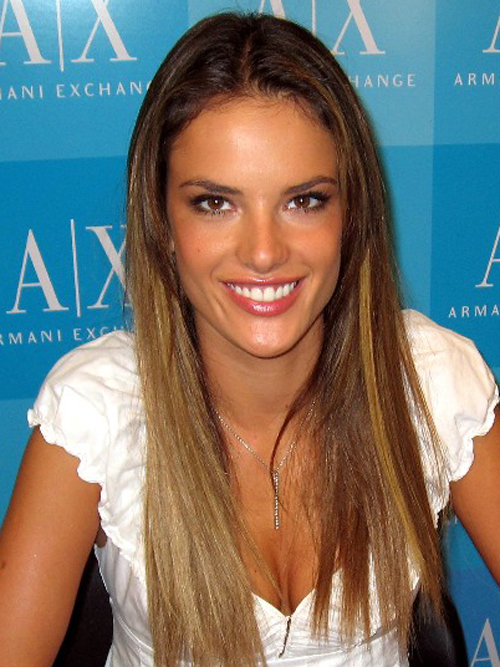
Alessandra Ambrósio

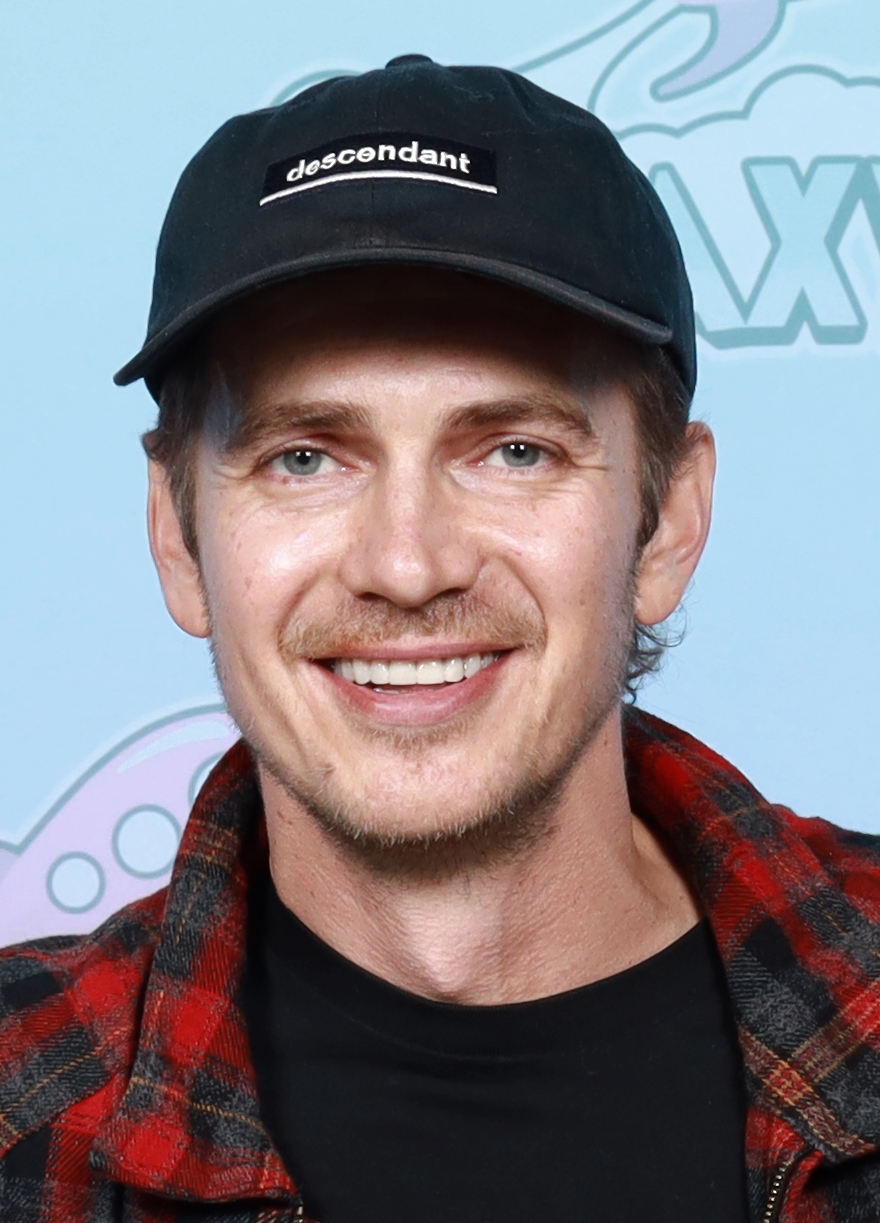
Hayden Christensen

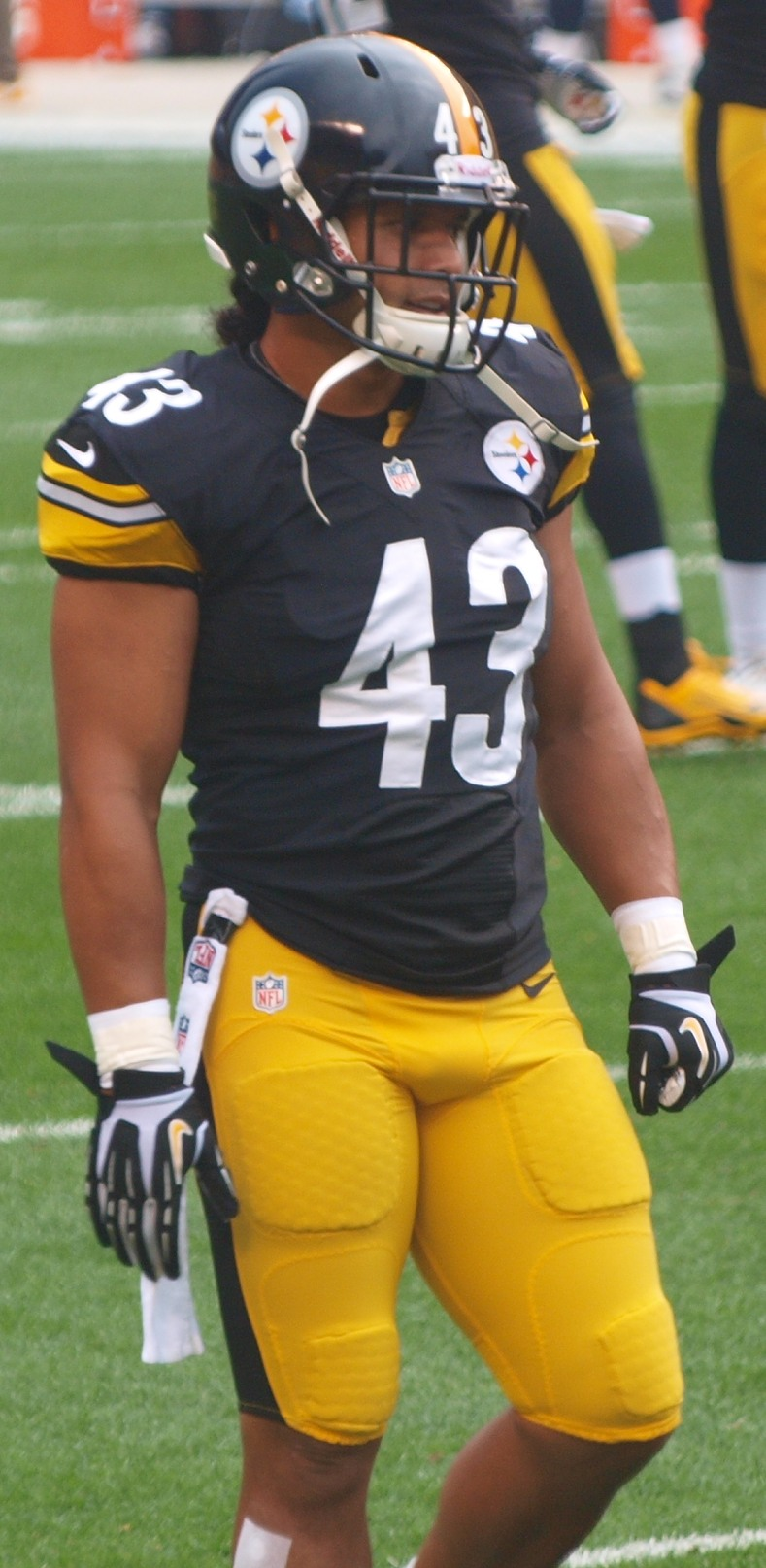
Troy Polamalu

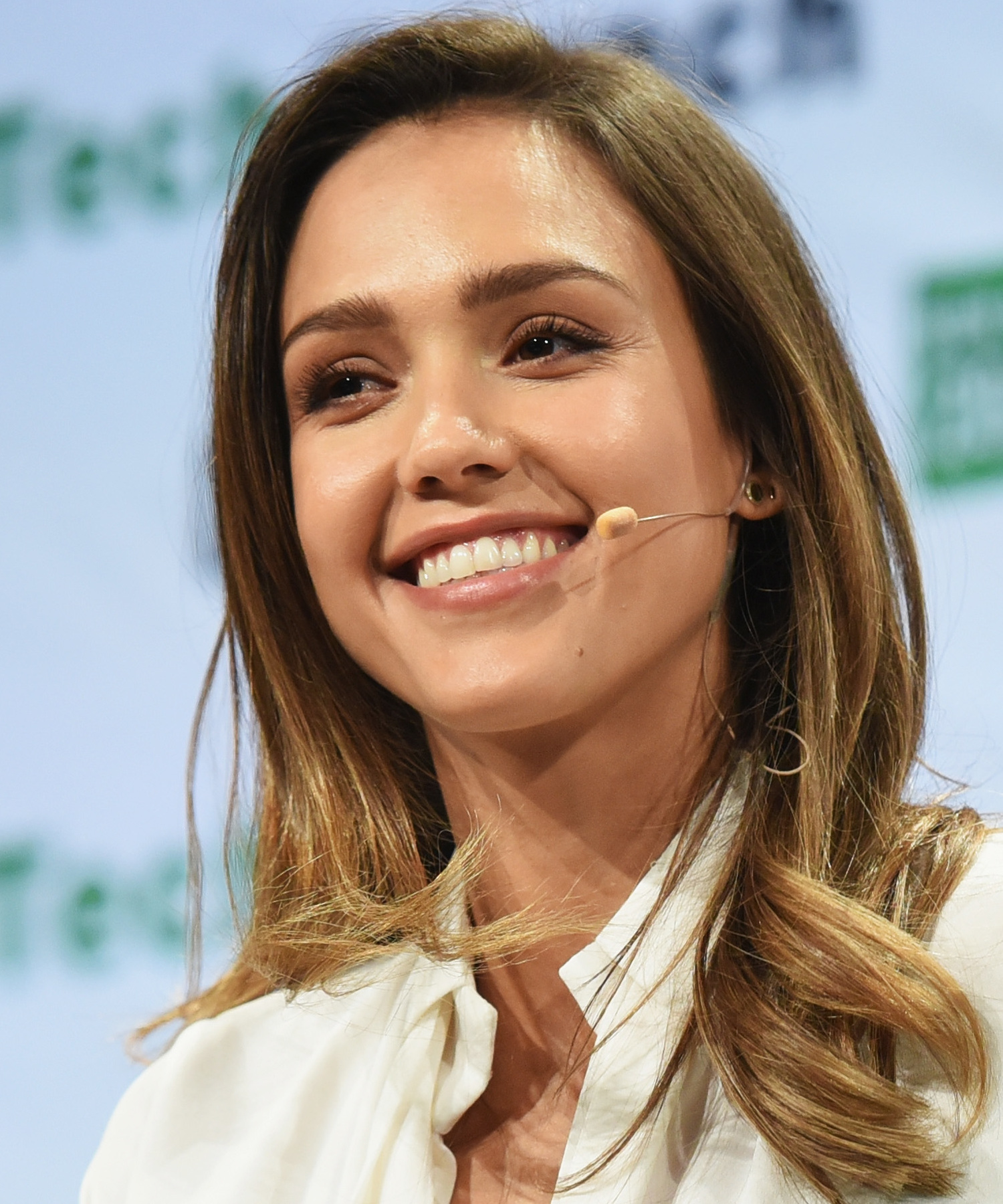
Jessica Alba

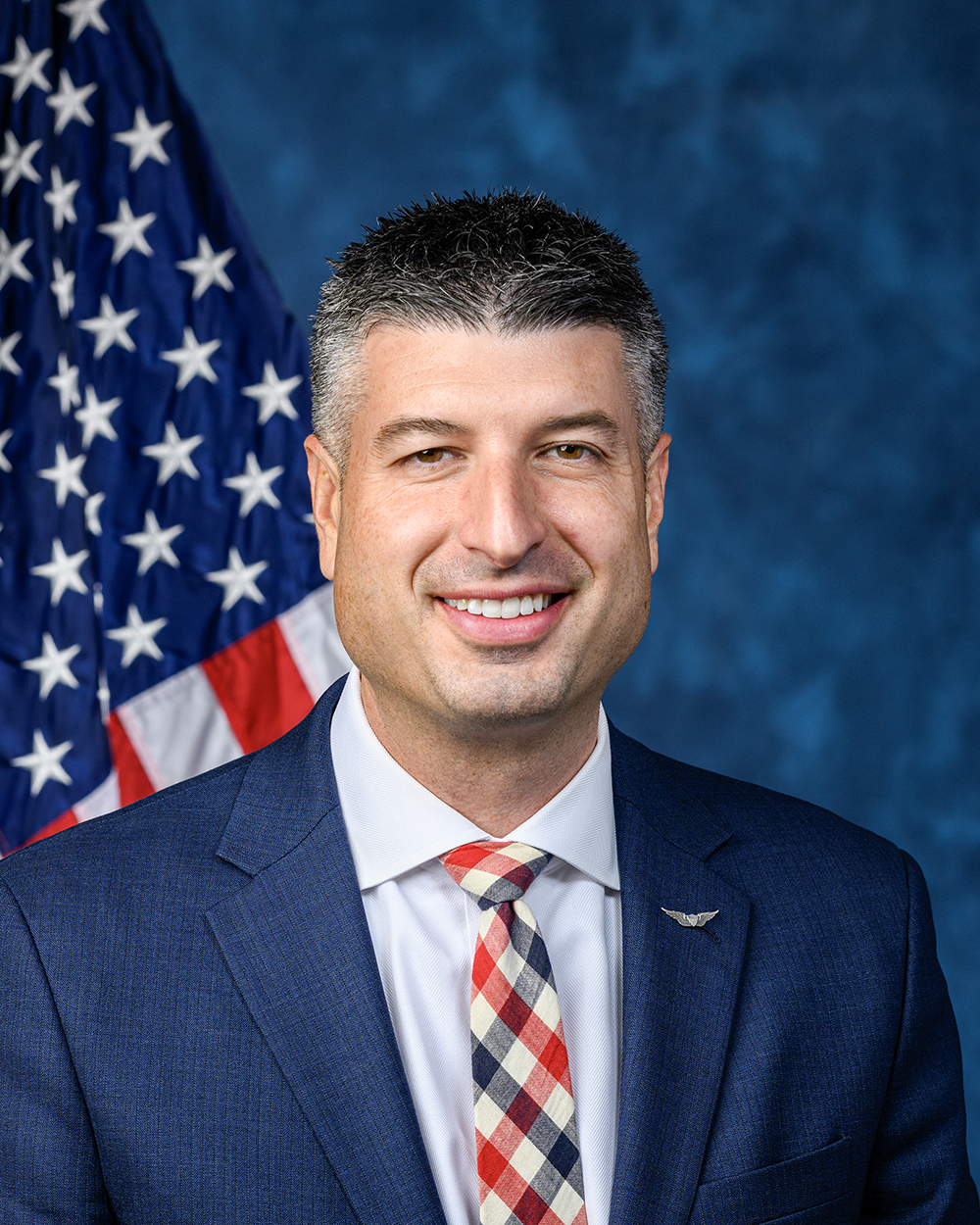
Tom Barrett

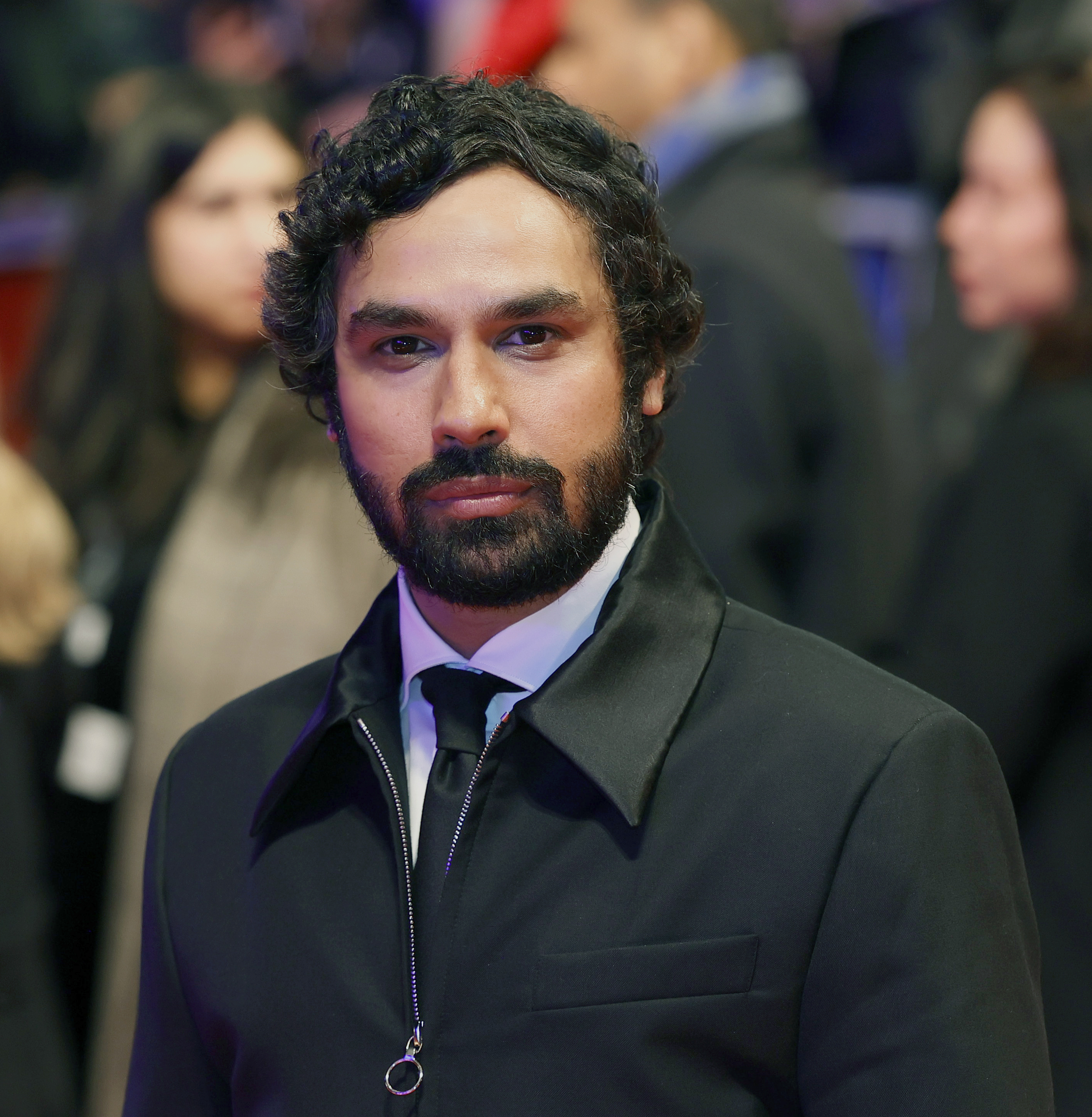
Kunal Nayyar

- April 1 – Dewitt Ellerbe, football player
- April 2
  - Rod Davis, football player
  - Josephine Decker, actress, filmmaker, and performance artist
  - Bethany Joy Lenz, actress and singer
  - Nicole Steinwedell, actress
- April 3
  - David Carlucci, politician
  - Ryan Doumit, baseball player
- April 4
  - Currensy, rapper
  - Casey Daigle, baseball player
  - Heather Edelson, politician
- April 5
  - T.V. Carpio, actress
  - Matthew Emmons, Olympic rifle shooter
  - Michael A. Monsoor, Navy SEAL and Medal of Honor recipient (d.2006)
- April 6
  - Eliza Coupe, actress
  - Kari Jobe, Christian singer/songwriter
  - Alex Suarez, musician/multi instrumentalist, producer, songwriter, DJ, remixer and mixing/mastering engineer for Cobra Starship and This is Ivy League
- April 7
  - Brian Dux, basketball player
  - Vanessa Olivarez, singer
  - Terrell Roberts, football player (d. 2019)
- April 8
  - Lamon Archey, actor
  - Brian Burres, baseball player
  - Jeff Dugan, football player
- April 9
  - Moran Atias, Israeli-born actress and model
  - A. J. Ellis, baseball player
  - Clay Fuller, politician
  - Eric Harris, mass murderer (died 1999)
- April 10
  - Gretchen Bleiler, Olympic snowboarder
  - Laura Bell Bundy, actress and singer
  - Jax Dane, wrestler
  - Michael Pitt, actor
  - Timmy Williams, actor and comedian
- April 12
  - Tulsi Gabbard, politician
  - Paul Rust, actor and comedian
  - JP Sears, comedian and internet personality
- April 13
  - Bryan Davis, inventor and distiller
  - Courtney Peldon, actress
  - Brenden Shucart, HIV/AIDS and LGBT rights activist, actor, and writer
- April 16
  - Russell Harvard, deaf actor
  - Jake Scott, football player
- April 18
  - Alessandra Ambrosio, Brazilian-born model, actress, fashion designer, businesswoman, and television personality
  - Brian Buscher, baseball player
  - Cameron Carpenter, organist and composer
- April 19
  - Hayden Christensen, Canadian-born actor
  - Troy Polamalu, football player
  - Jonas Neubauer, tetris player
- April 21 – Paul Curtman, politician
- April 22
  - Lindsay Nicole Chambers, actress
  - Ken Dorsey, football player
- April 24 – Taylor Dent, tennis player
- April 26 – Michael Dorman, New Zealand-born actor
- April 27 – Drew Elliott, fashion model and television personality
- April 28
  - Jessica Alba, actress and businesswoman
  - Lester Estelle II, drummer and backing vocalist for Pillar
  - Alex Riley, wrestler and commentator
- April 29
  - Guy Blakeslee, psychedelic and stoner rock musician
  - Alex Vincent, actor
- April 30
  - Tom Barrett, politician
  - Tom Goss, singer/songwriter and actor
  - Kunal Nayyar, British-born Indian-raised American actor

=== May ===
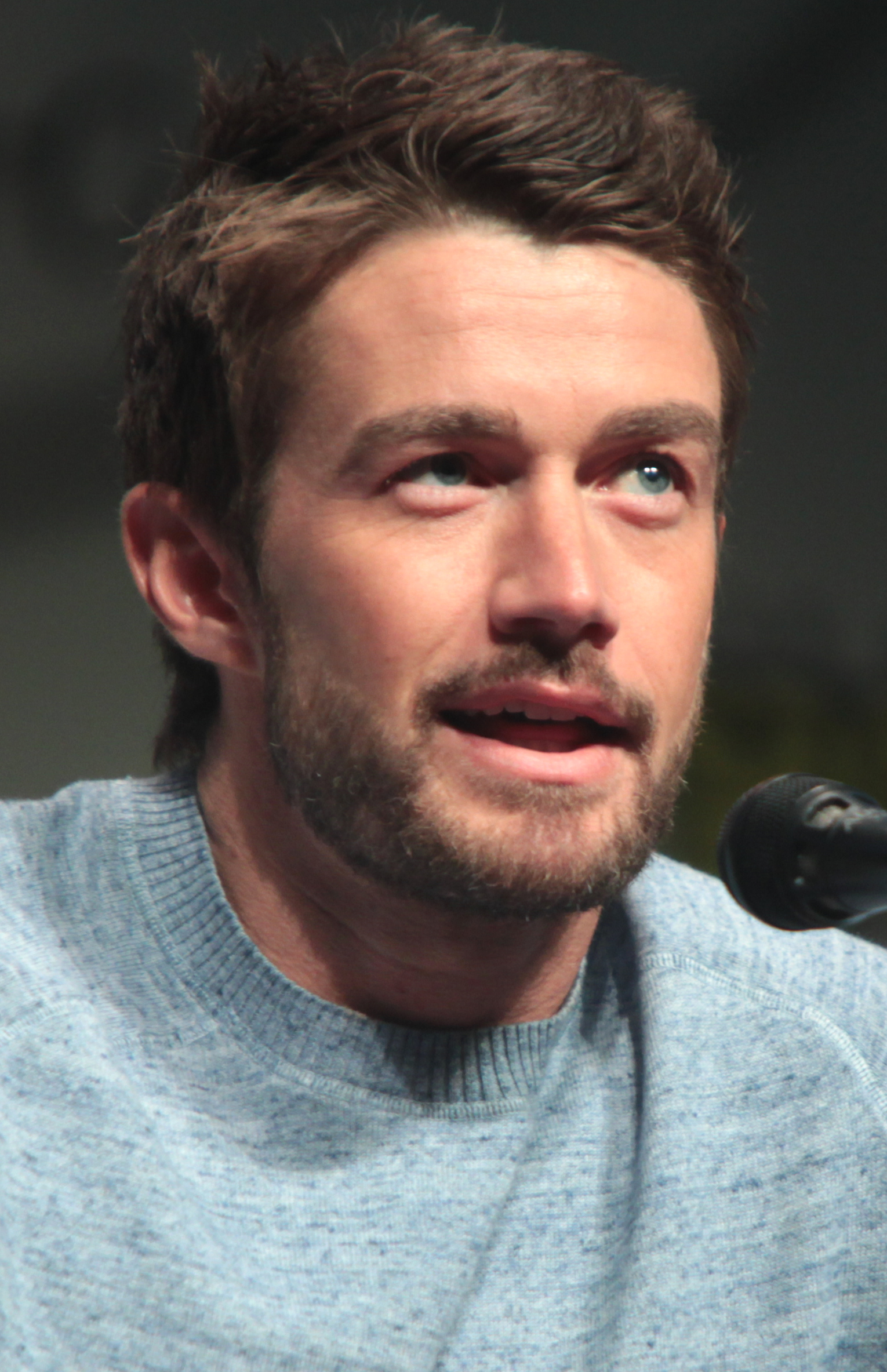
Robert Buckley

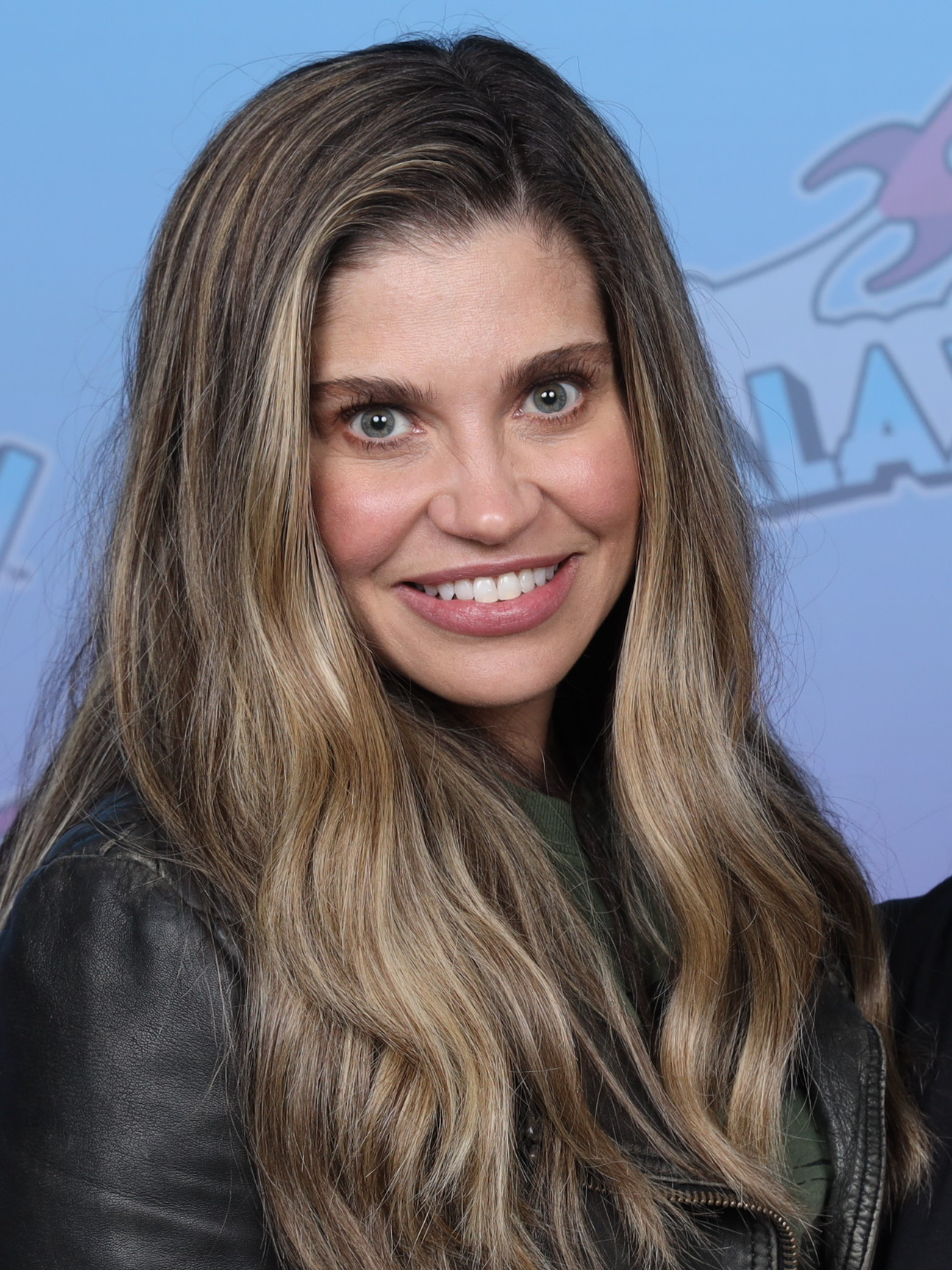
Danielle Fishel

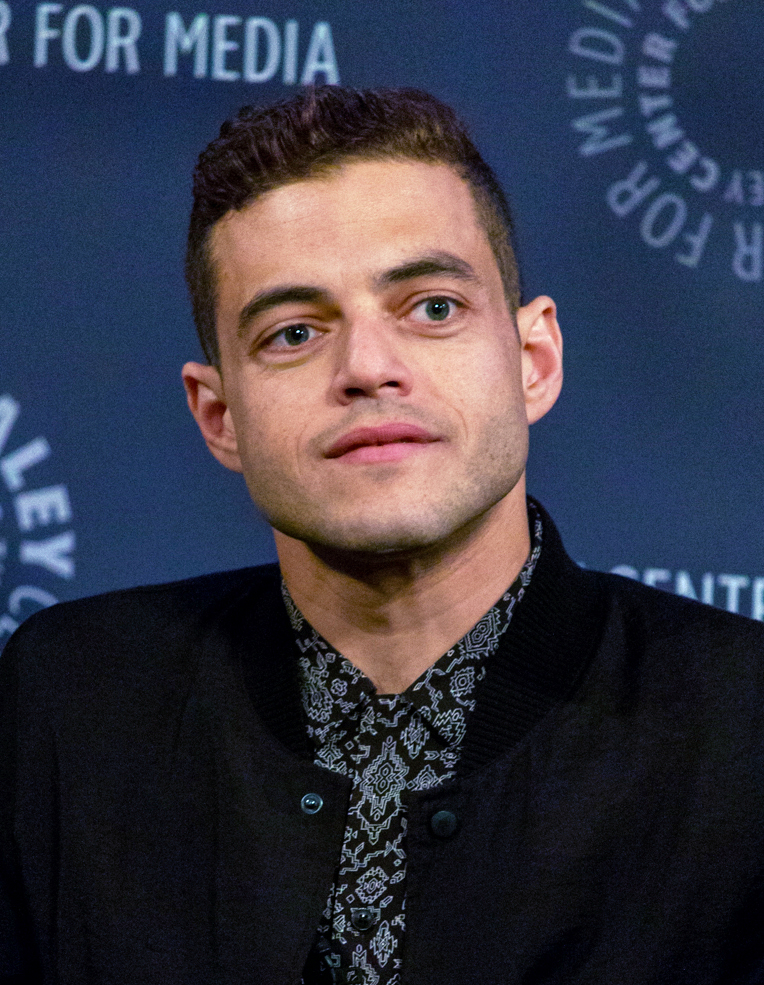
Rami Malek

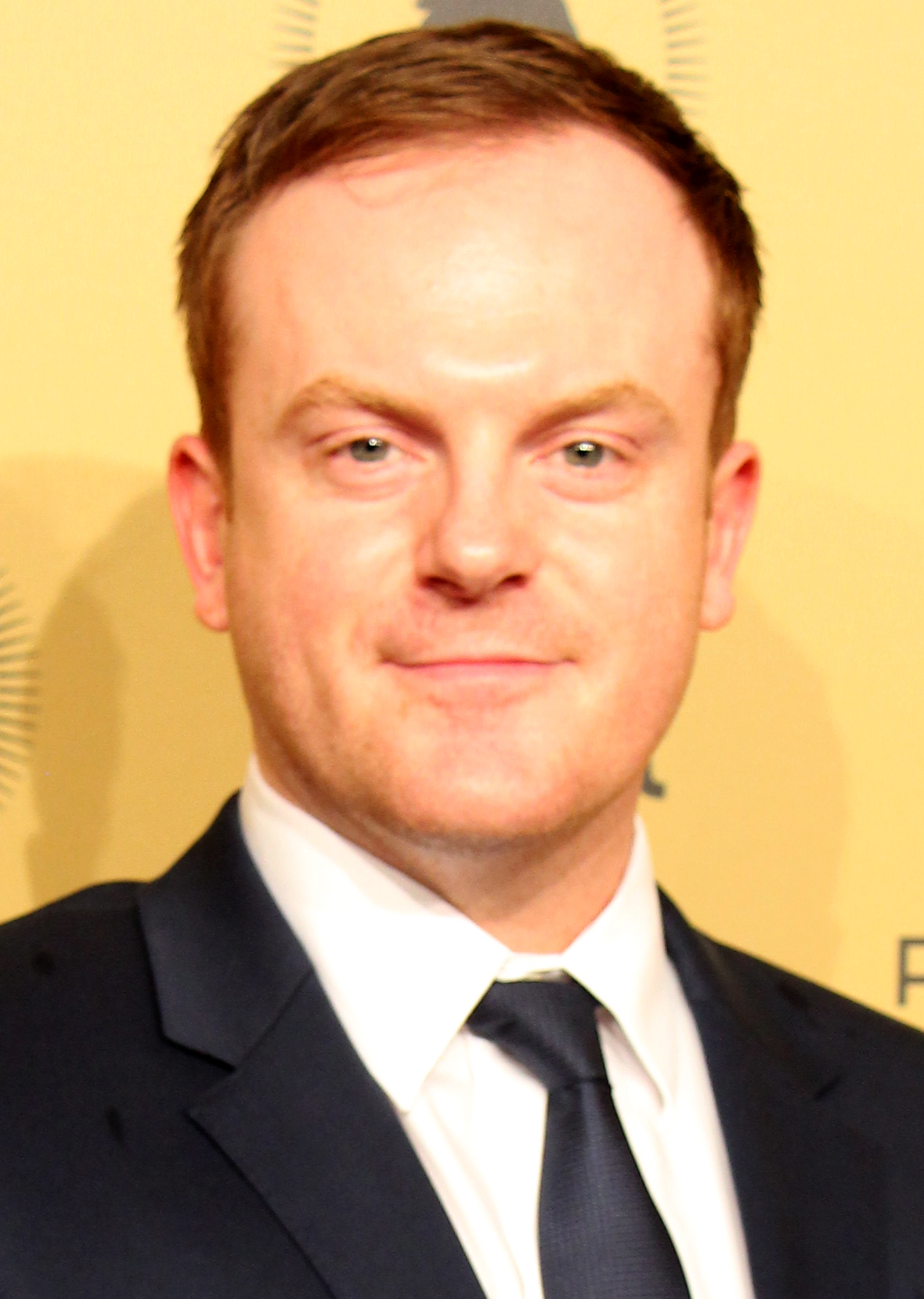
Jeremy Bobb

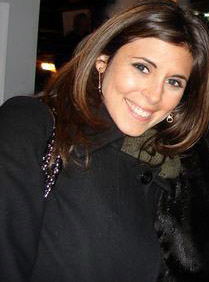
Jamie-Lynn Sigler

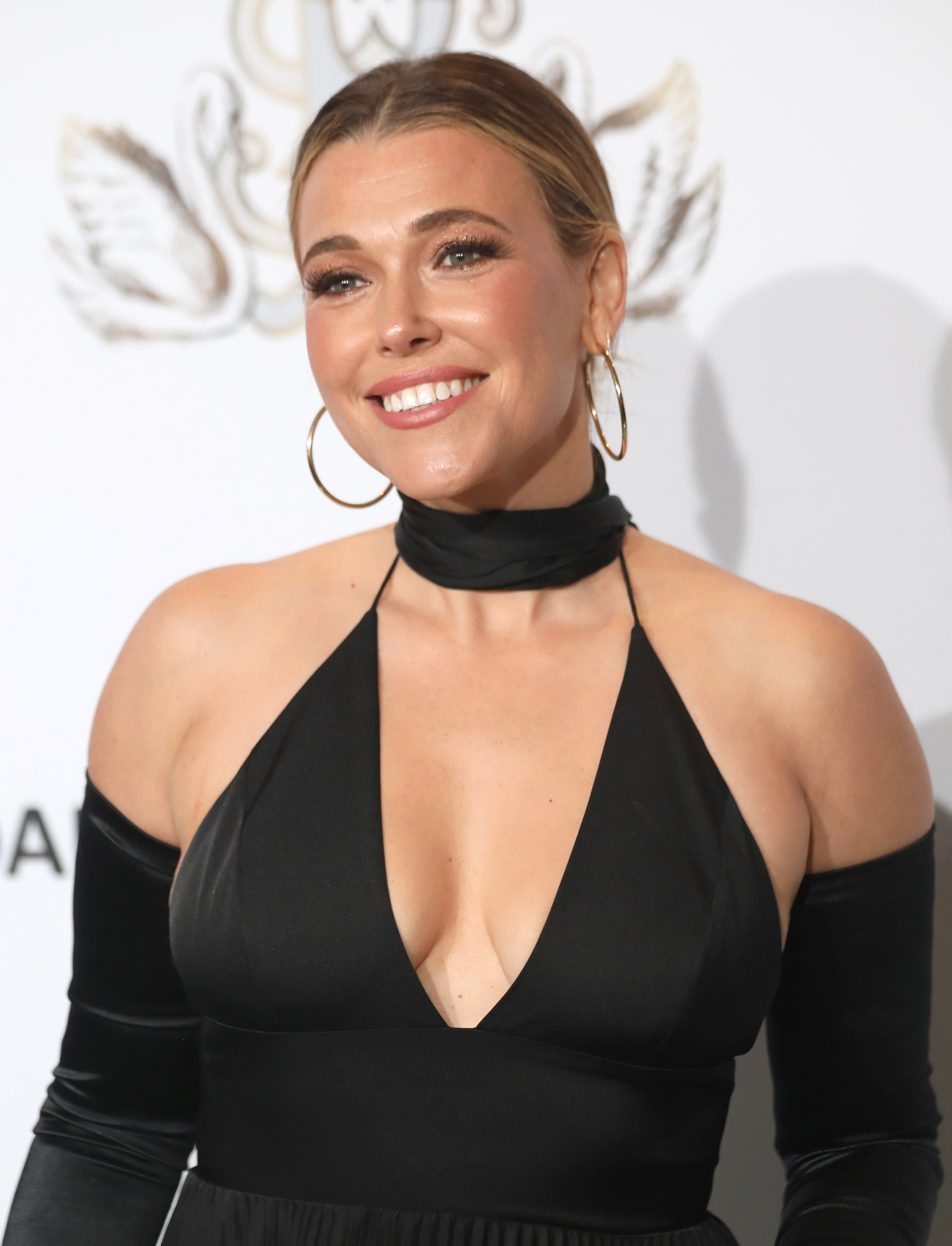
Rachel Platten

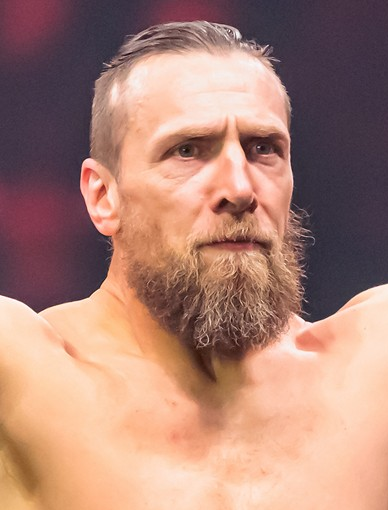
Bryan Danielson

Laura Bailey

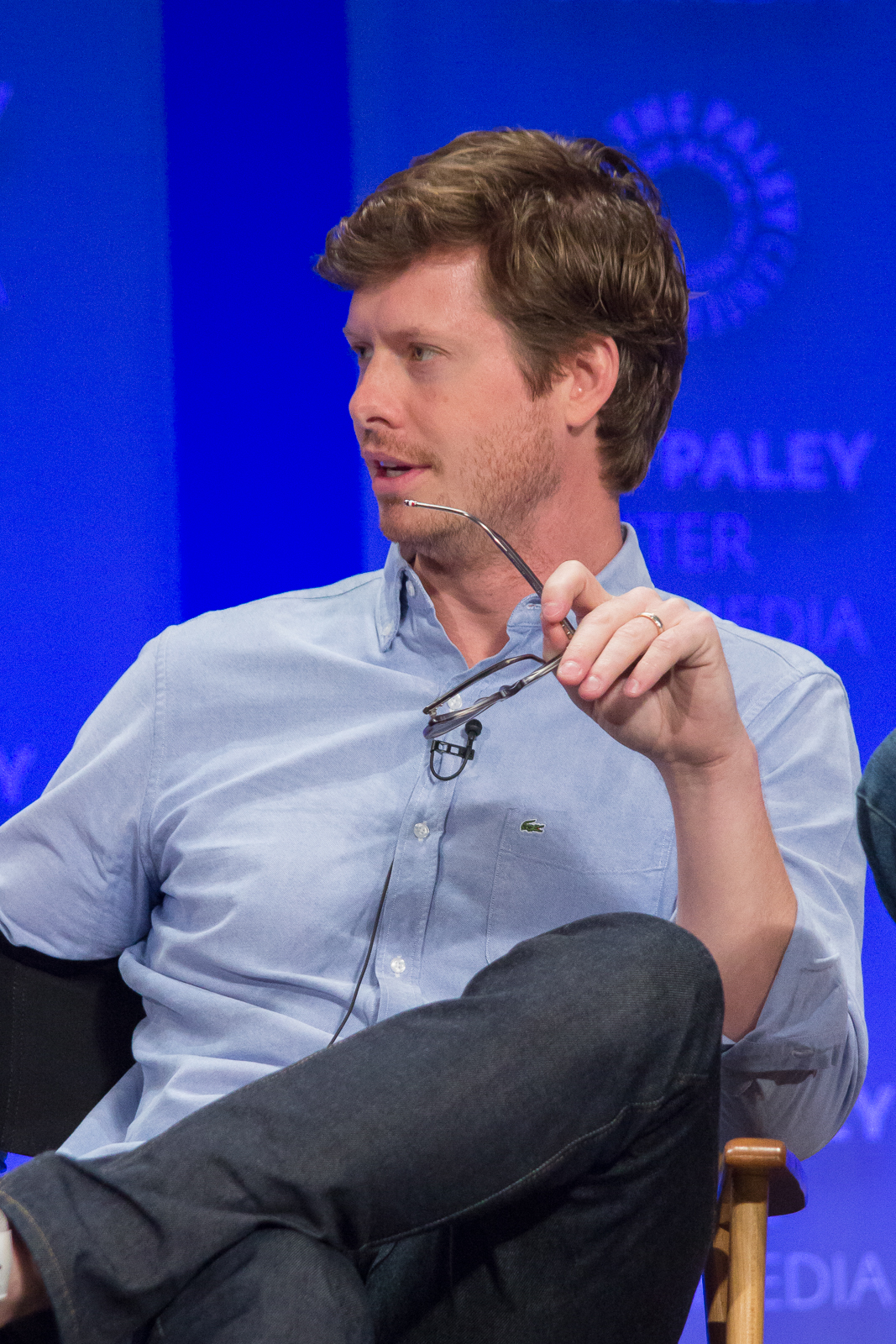
Anders Holm

- May 1 – Wes Welker, football player
- May 2 – Robert Buckley, actor
- May 3
  - Farrah Franklin, singer
  - Trevor Strnad, singer and frontman for The Black Dahlia Murder (d. 2022)
- May 4
  - Matt DeMarchi, American-born Italian ice hockey player
  - Jason Kander, politician and podcaster
  - Dallon Weekes, musician
- May 5
  - Chris Duncan, baseball player (died 2019)
  - Danielle Fishel, actress
  - Shane Landrum, television personality
- May 6 – Bubba Dickerson, golfer
- May 7
  - Dave Canales, football coach
  - Monzavous Edwards, American-born Nigerian sprinter
- May 10 – Koko Archibong, Nigerian-born basketball player
- May 11
  - Heidi Cortez, entrepreneur, coach, model, and writer
  - JP Karliak, actor, voice actor and comedian
  - Austin O'Brien, actor and photographer
  - Daniel Ortmeier, baseball player
- May 12 – Rami Malek, actor
- May 13
  - Jeremy Bobb, actor
  - Herman Cornejo, Argentine-born ballet dancer
  - Jimmy Yang, wrestler
- May 15
  - Laurel Libby, politician
  - Jamie-Lynn Sigler, actress
- May 16 – Dwan Edwards, football player
- May 17
  - Bronwen Dickey, author, journalist, and lecturer
  - R. J. Helton, singer
- May 18
  - Jesse Cox, YouTube gaming personality, comedian, voice actor, and media commentator
  - Desus Nice, television, YouTube, and Twitter personality
  - Adam Green, singer/songwriter
- May 20
  - Wally Adeyemo, Nigerian-born politician
  - Rachel Platten, singer/songwriter
  - Lindsay Taylor, basketball player
- May 21
  - Scott Aaronson, theoretical computer scientist
  - Craig Anderson, ice hockey player
  - Belladonna, actress, director, producer, model, and pornographic and erotic actress
  - Josh Hamilton, baseball player
- May 22
  - Eric Butorac, tennis Player
  - Bryan Danielson, wrestler
  - Melissa Gregory, figure skater
  - Celeste Maloy, lawyer and politician
- May 23
  - Dessa, rapper, singer/songwriter, record executive, and member of Doomtree
  - Tim Robinson, actor and comedian
  - Charles Rogers, football player (died 2019)
- May 24
  - Elijah Burke, wrestler
  - Jerod Mixon, actor, comedian, writer, and producer
- May 25 – Logan Tom, Olympic volleyball player
- May 26
  - Craig Callahan, American-born Italian basketball player
  - Anthony Ervin, Olympic swimmer
  - Isaac Slade, singer/songwriter and pianist
  - Ben Zobrist, baseball player
- May 27
  - Nick Barnett, football player
  - Darnell Dockett, football player
- May 28
  - Laura Bailey, voice actress
  - Aaron Schock, politician
- May 29
  - Justin Chon, actor
  - Alton Ford, basketball player (died 2018)
  - Anders Holm, actor and comedian
  - Brian Simnjanovski, football player (died 2009)
  - Randall Woodfin, politician, mayor of Birmingham, Alabama
- May 30
  - Devendra Banhart, singer/songwriter and visual artist
  - Blake Bashoff, actor
  - Frankie Delgado, Mexican-born actor, producer, and television personality
- May 31 – Jake Peavy, baseball player

=== June ===
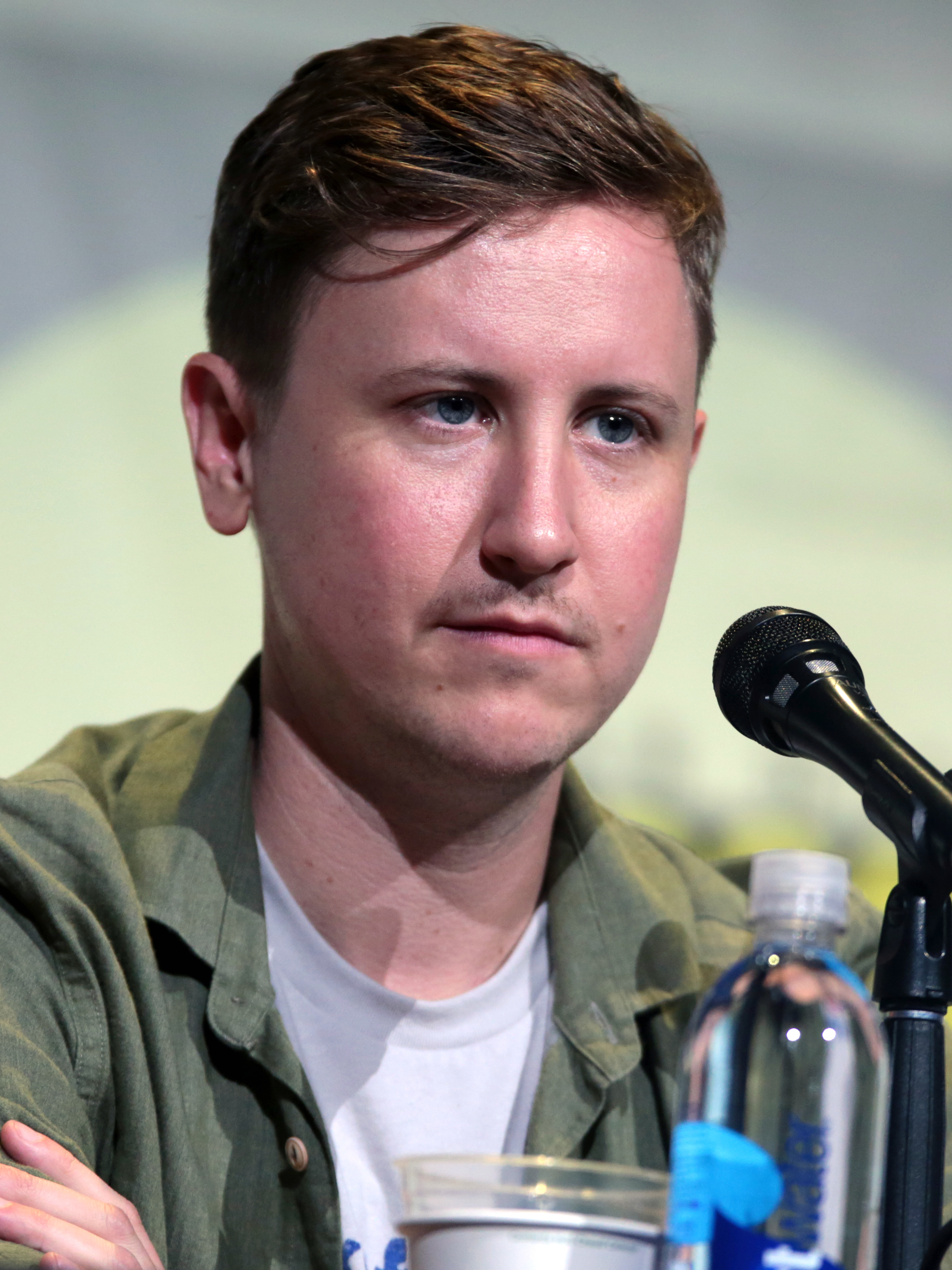
Johnny Pemberton

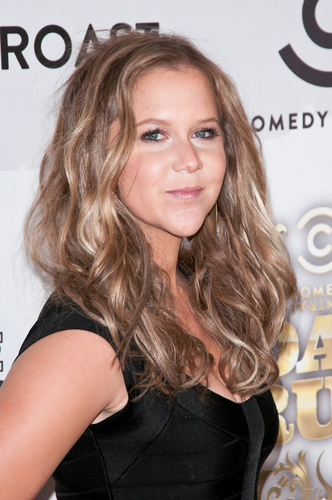
Amy Schumer

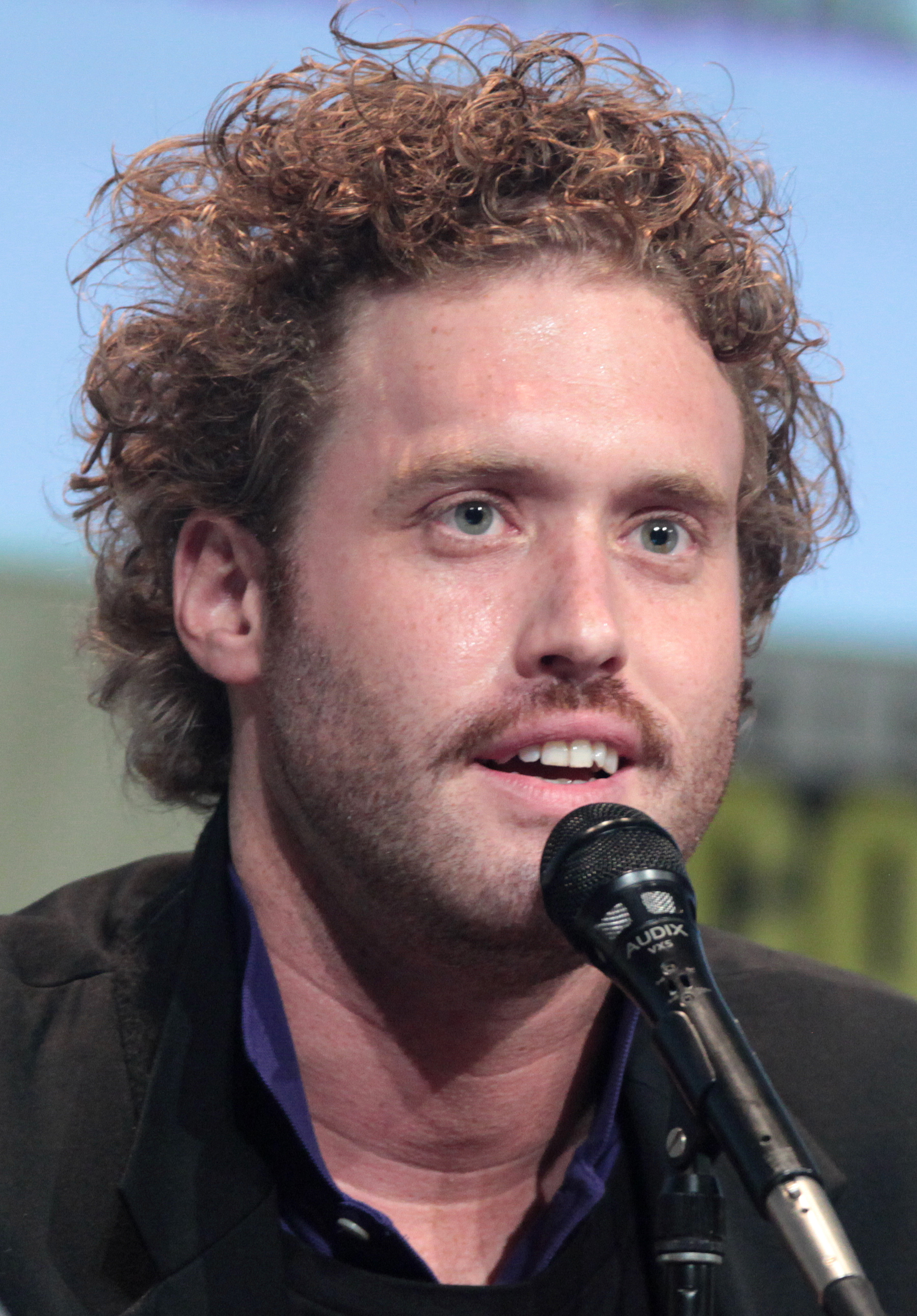
T.J. Miller

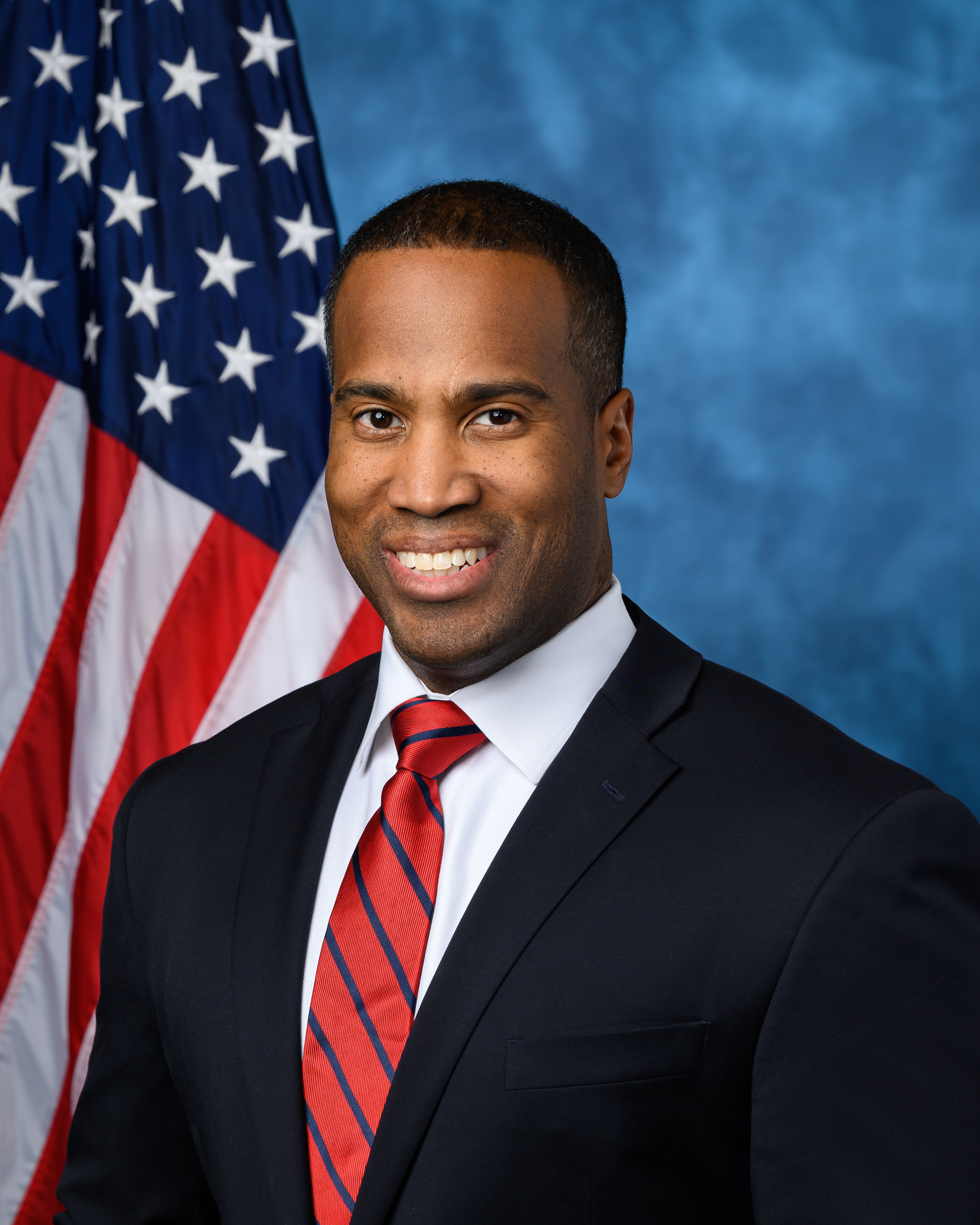
John E. James

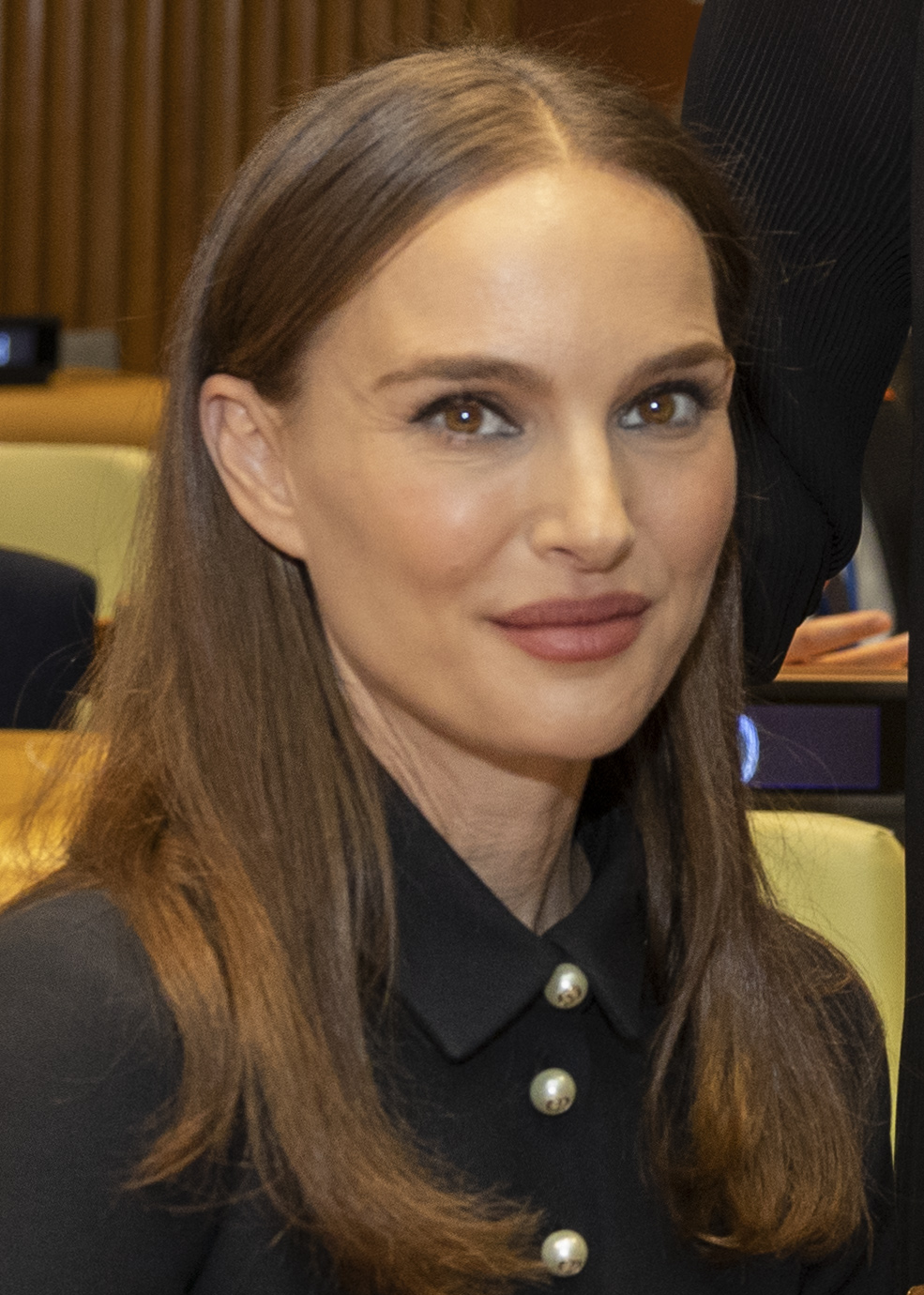
Natalie Portman

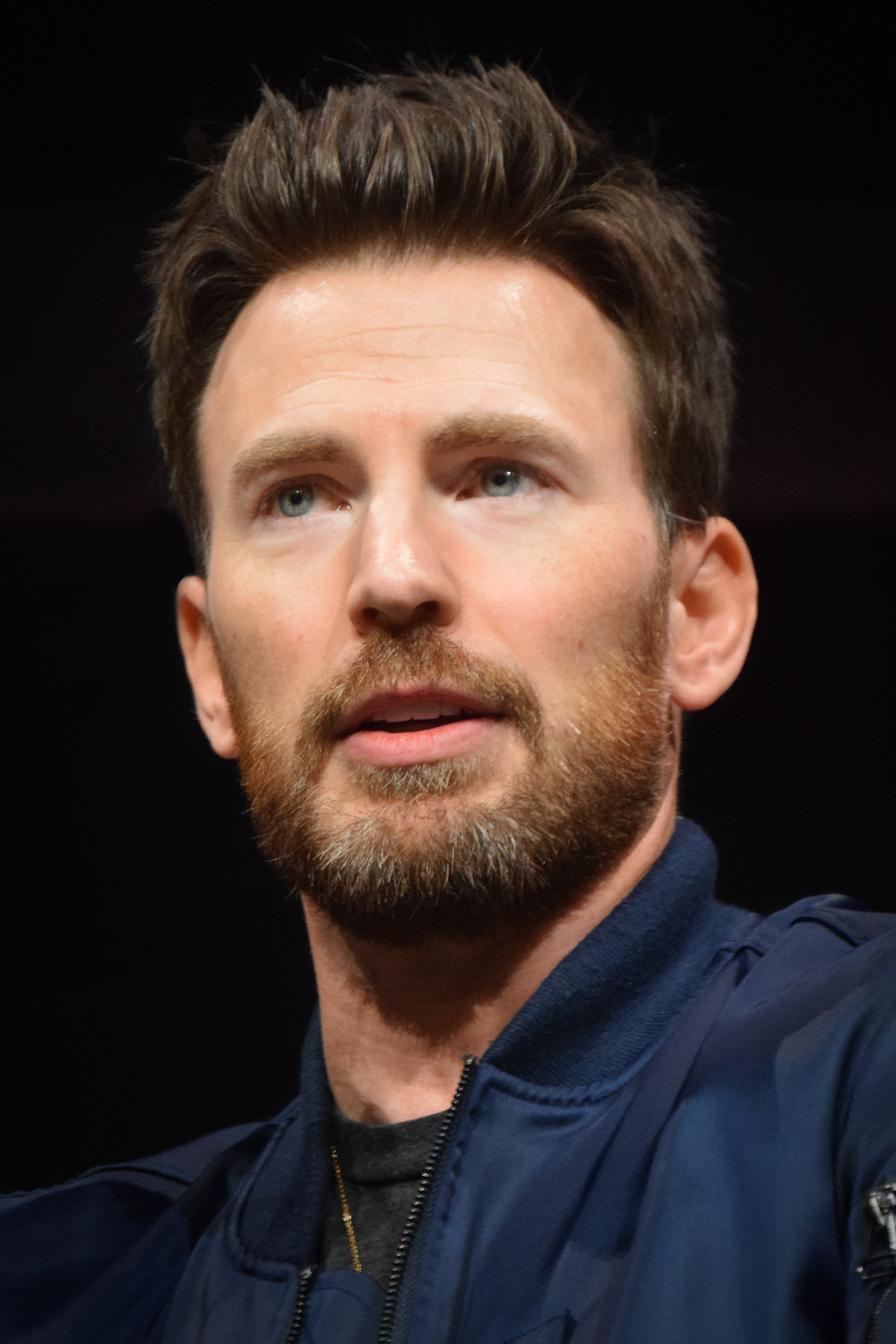
Chris Evans

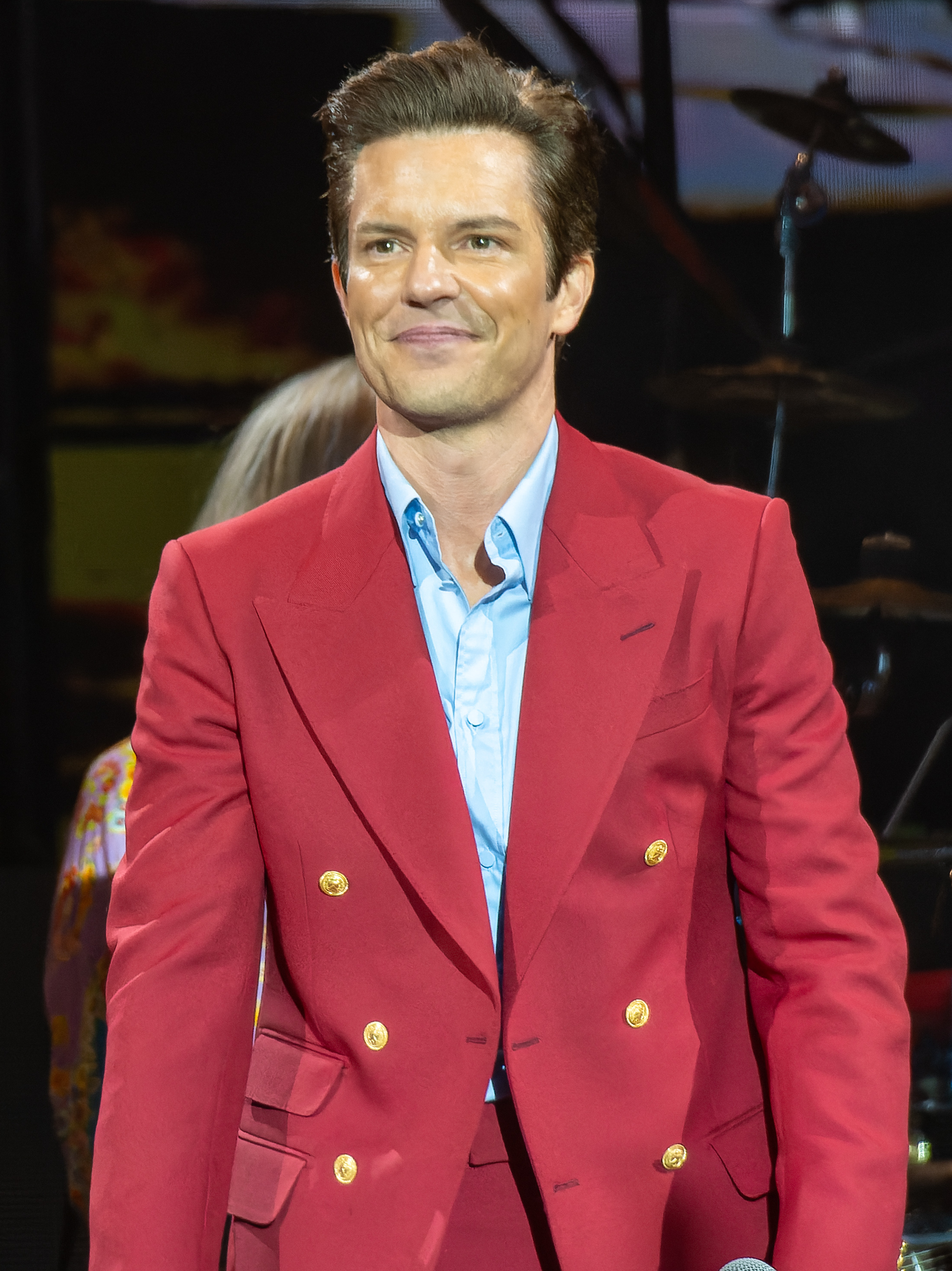
Brandon Flowers

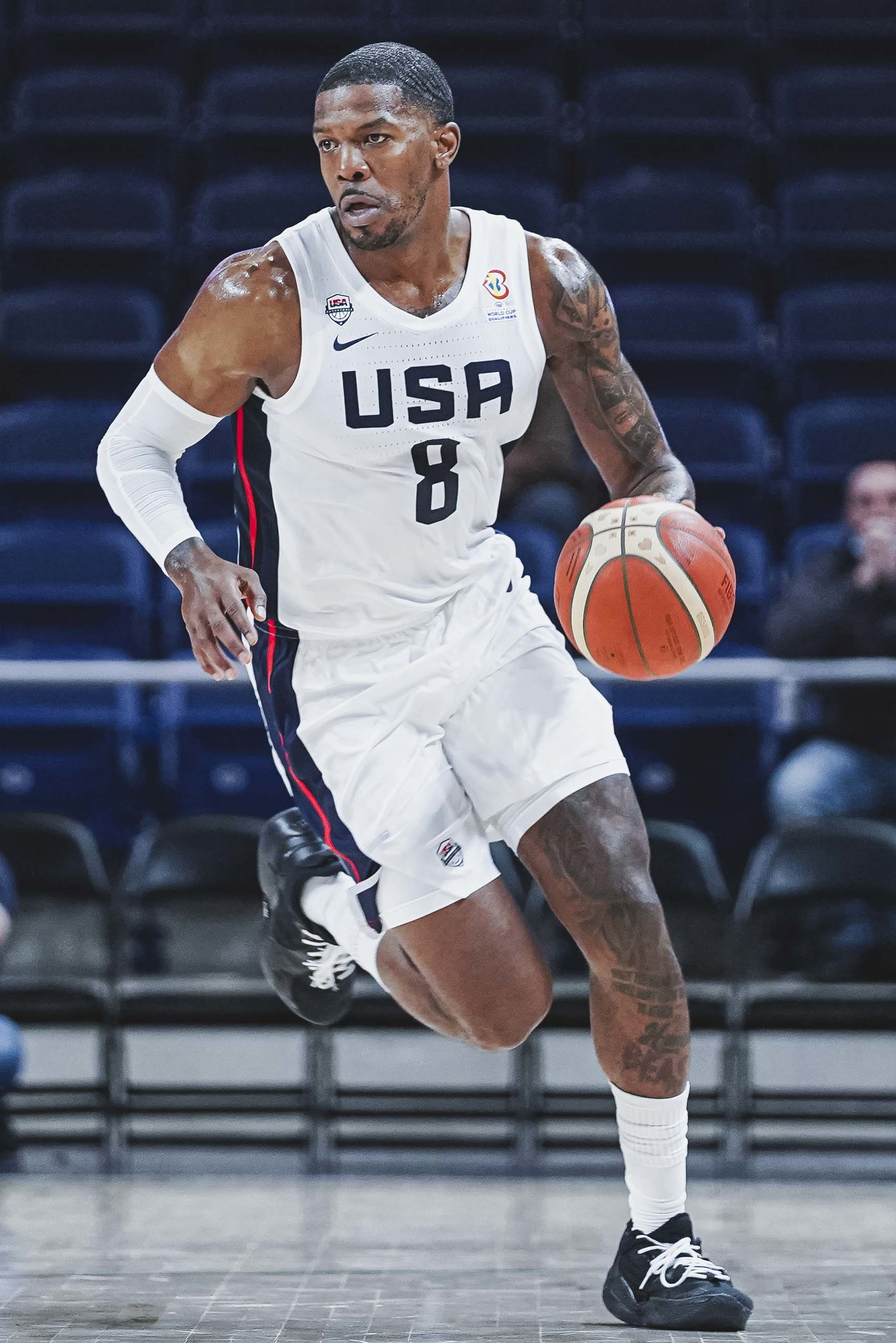
Joe Johnson

- June 1
  - Brandi Carlile, singer/songwriter
  - David Eastman, politician
  - Smush Parker, basketball player
  - Johnny Pemberton, actor and comedian
  - Amy Schumer, comedian, actress, and screenwriter
- June 2
  - Jared Burton, baseball player
  - Velvet Sky, wrestler
- June 3
  - Sam Amidon, singer/songwriter and multi-instrumentalist
  - Rich Rundles, baseball player (d. 2019)
- June 4
  - Paul Daniels, rower
  - Tonya Evinger, mixed martial artist
  - T.J. Miller, comedian, actor, and screenwriter
- June 6
  - Brent Darby, basketball player
  - Johnny Pacar, actor
- June 7
  - Shireen Ghorbani, politician
  - Tyler Johnson, baseball player
  - Larisa Oleynik, actress
- June 8
  - Alex Band, singer and frontman for the Calling
  - Ashley Biden, social worker, activist, philanthropist, fashion designer, and daughter of U.S. President Joe Biden
  - DJ Cobra, deejay
  - Rachel Held Evans, Christian columnist, blogger and author (died 2019)
  - John E. James, businessman, veteran, and political candidate
  - Sara Watkins, violinist
- June 9
  - Drew Anderson, baseball player
  - Natalie Portman, Israeli-born actress
- June 10
  - Jonathan Bennett, actor and model
  - Joshua Claybourn, attorney, author, and historian
  - Glenn Earl, football player
- June 11 – Andy Dean, radio talk show host, political commentator, and media executive
- June 12
  - John Gourley, musician and singer
  - Jeremy Howard, actor
- June 13 – Chris Evans, actor
- June 15
  - Marie Harf, political commentator
  - Billy Martin, guitarist, songwriter, and illustrator
  - Jeremy Reed, baseball player
  - Haley Scarnato, singer
  - Nick Sirianni, football player and coach
  - Maxey Whitehead, voice actress
- June 16
  - Ben Kweller musician
  - Joe Saunders, baseball player
- June 17
  - Kyle Boller, football player
  - Danny Core, baseball player
- June 18 – Scooter Braun, media proprietor, record executive, and investor
- June 19
  - Mario Duplantier, French-born drummer for Gojira
  - Melissa McMorrow, boxer
- June 20 – Demarco Castle, singer and rapper
- June 21
  - Jeff Baker, baseball player
  - Wesley Duke, football player
  - Brandon Flowers, singer/songwriter and vocalist for The Killers
- June 22 – Monty Oum, animator, director, and screenwriter (d. 2015)
- June 24
  - Harvey Dahl, football player
  - Tilky Jones, singer and actor
  - Cris Lankenau, actor
  - Vanessa Ray, actress and singer
- June 27
  - DJ Cassidy, record producer and MC
  - John Driscoll, actor
- June 28
  - Antoine Becks, Canadian-born musician, singer, producer, and actor
  - Josh Christy, politician (d. 2025)
  - Jon Watts, director, producer, and screenwriter
- June 29
  - Anthony Crawford, bassist, songwriter, producer, and recording artist
  - Joe Johnson, basketball player
- June 30
  - Andrew Alberts, ice hockey player
  - Anna Slotky, actress and attorney

=== July ===
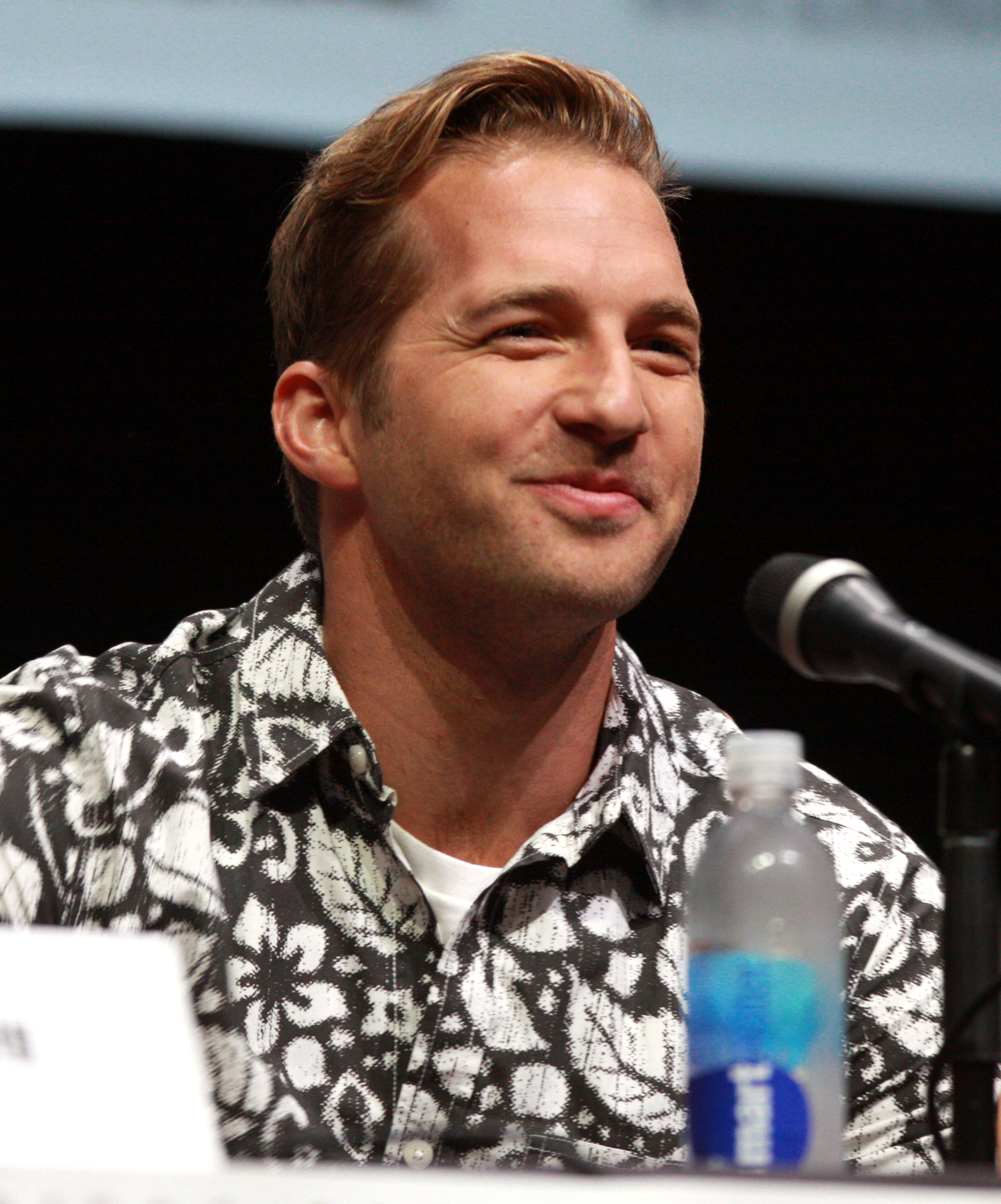
Ryan Hansen

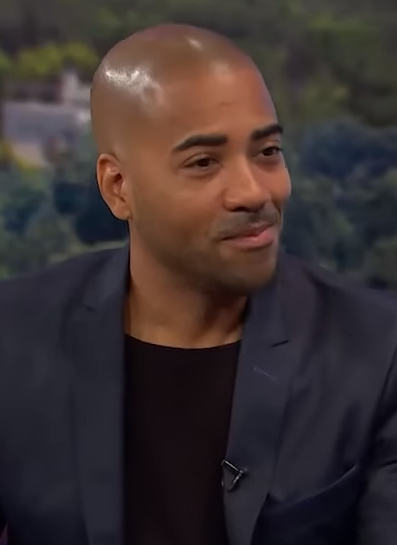
Brad James

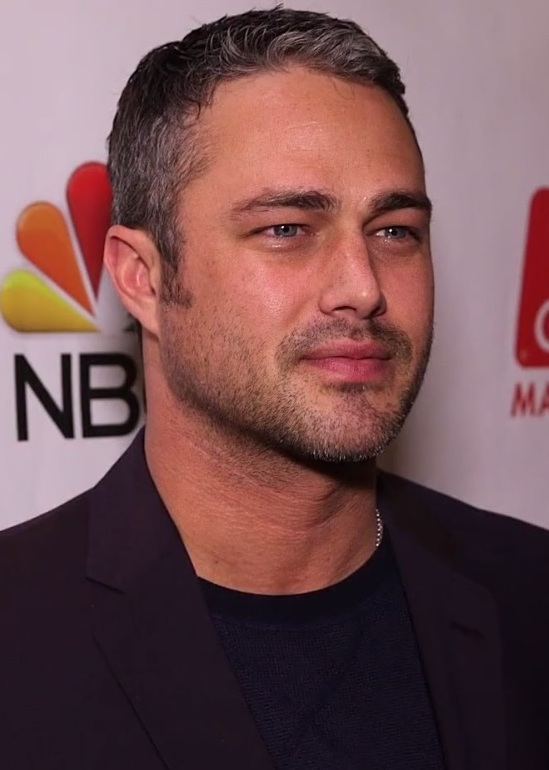
Taylor Kinney

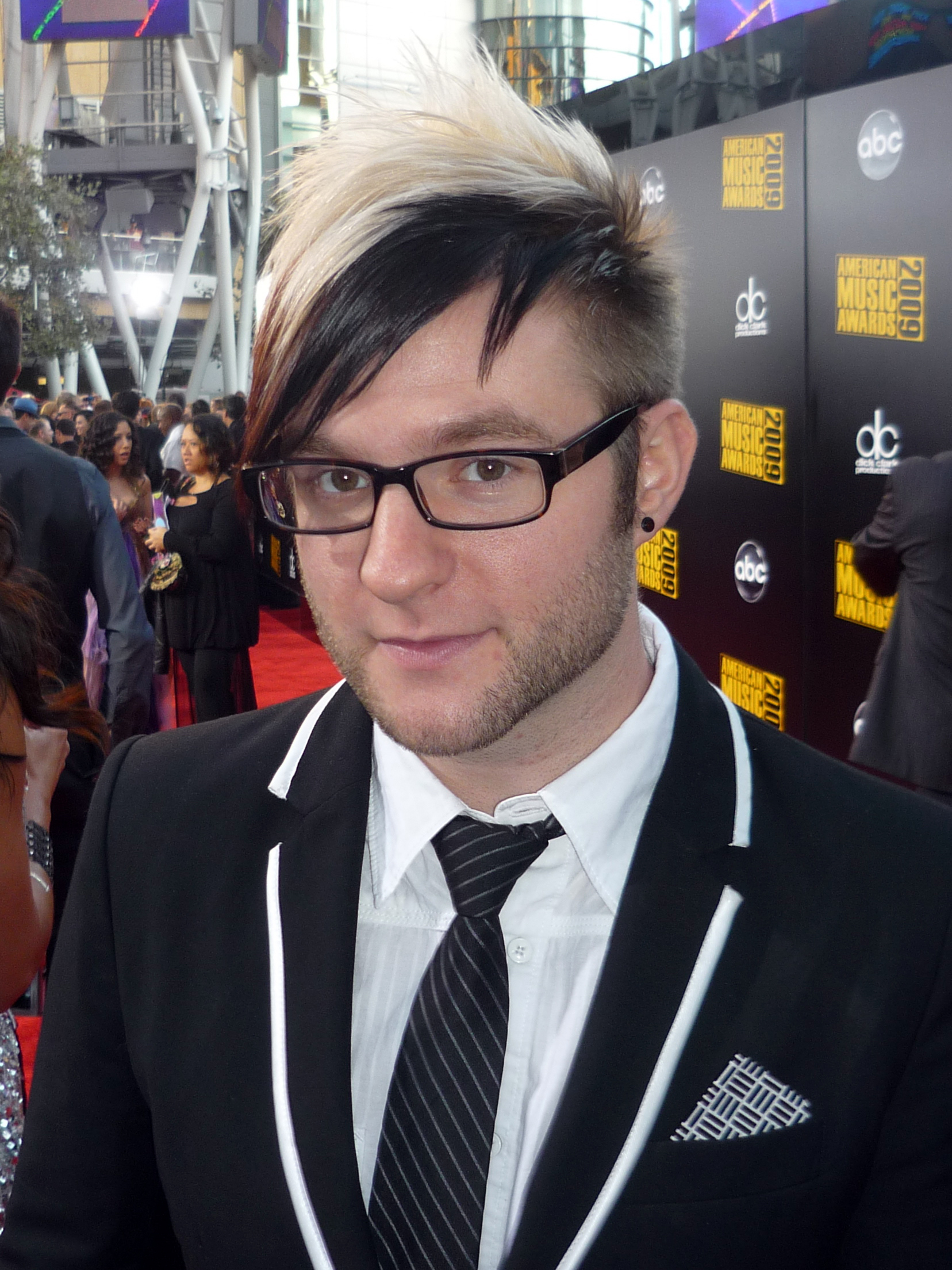
Blake Lewis

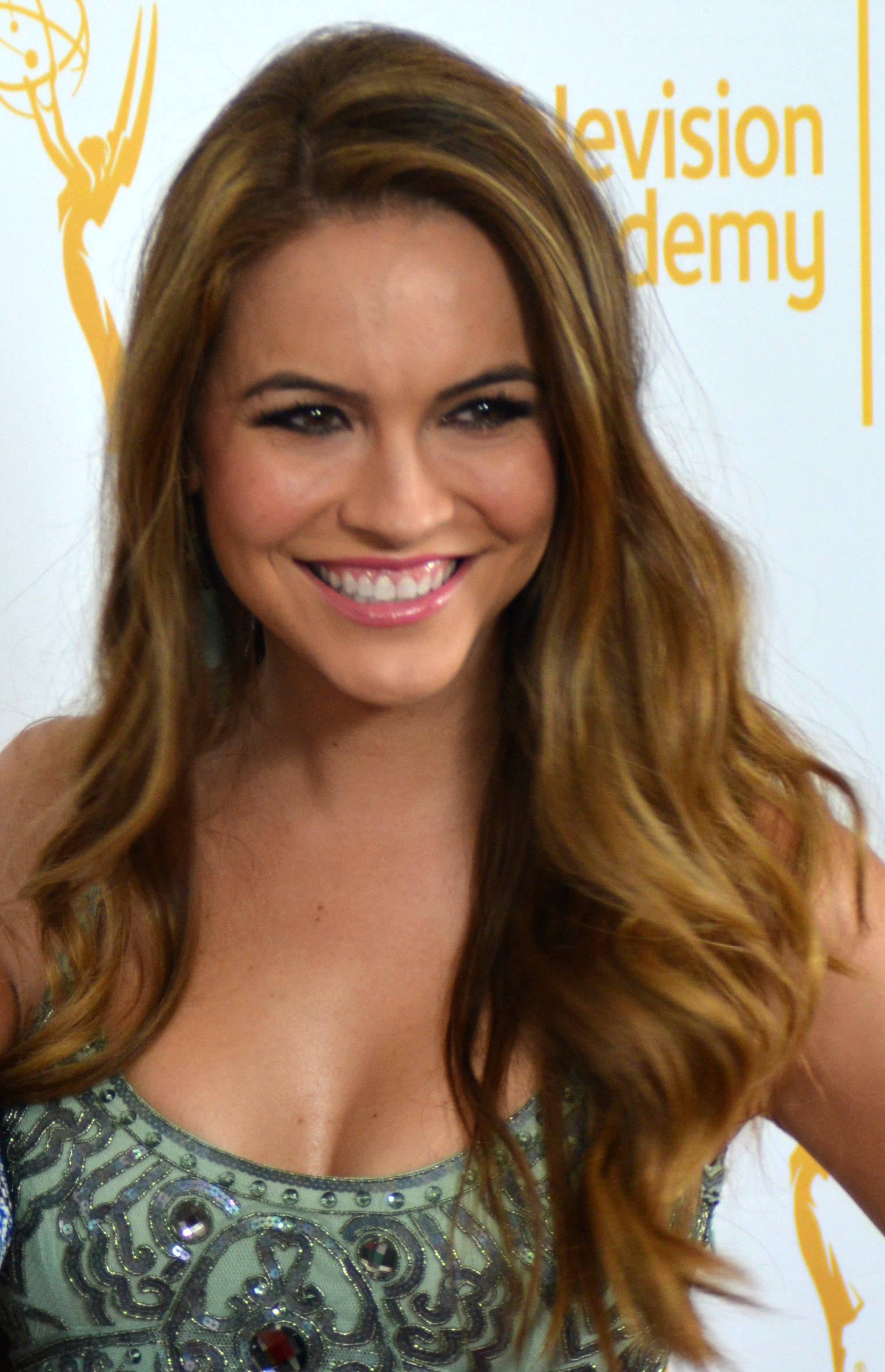
Chrishell Stause

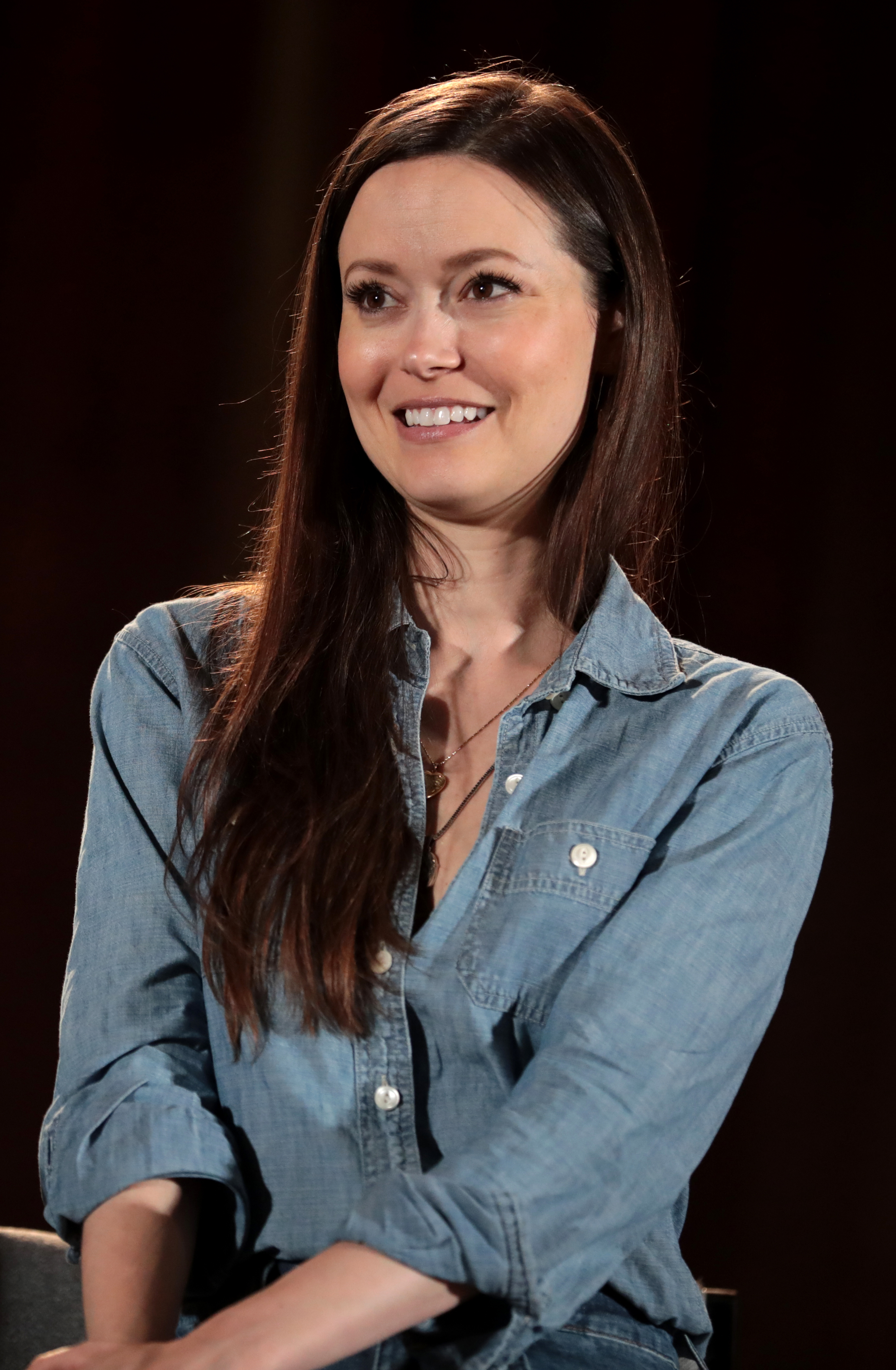
Summer Glau

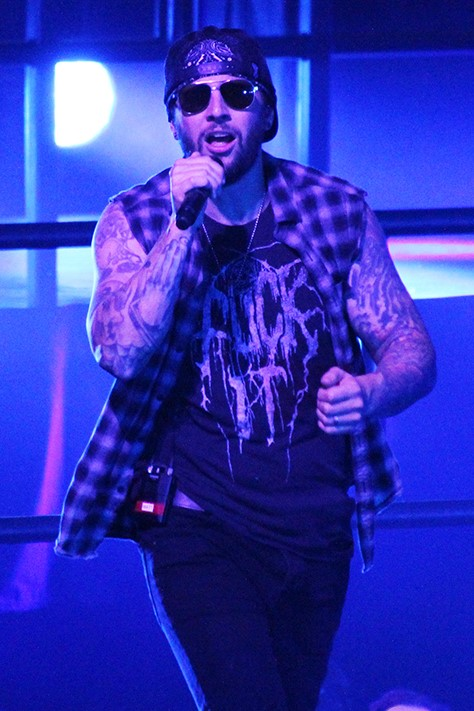
M. Shadows

- July 1
  - Jenna Arnold, businessperson, entrepreneur, and co-founder of ORGANIZE
  - Matt Carson, baseball player
  - Amanda Seales, comedian, actress, rapper and songwriter
- July 2
  - Yeti Beats, record producer and songwriter
  - Alex Koroknay-Palicz, activist
- July 3 – Colin Frangicetto, guitarist
- July 4
  - Brock Berlin, football player
  - Will Smith, football player (d. 2016)
- July 5 – Ryan Hansen, actor
- July 6
  - Nnamdi Asomugha, football player
  - Eddie Bonine, baseball player
  - John Cox, Venezuelan-born basketball player
  - Charles Drake, football player
  - Mike Karney, football player
  - Synyster Gates, guitarist for Avenged Sevenfold
- July 7
  - Brad James, actor
  - Synyster Gates, guitarist for Avenged Sevenfold
  - Tasha Cobbs Leonard, gospel musician and songwriter
- July 8 – Lance Gross, actor, model and photographer
- July 9 – Michelle Collins, comedian
- July 11 – Andre Johnson, football player
- July 12 – Phil Dumatrait, baseball player
- July 13
  - Monica Byrne, playwright and science fiction author
  - Fran Kranz, actor
- July 14
  - Mark Evitts, composer, producer, string arranger, and multi-instrumentalist
  - Teri Reeves, actress
- July 15
  - Lowell Bailey, Olympic biathlete
  - Taylor Kinney, actor and model
- July 17
  - Chris Brown, politician
  - Leila Djansi, Ghanaian-born filmmaker
  - Josh Scogin, singer and vocalist for '68
- July 18 – Luke Dowler, songwriter, performer, and producer
- July 19
  - Scott Clements, poker player
  - Josh Dobson, politician
  - Angela Trimbur, actress, writer, dancer, choreographer, and television personality
- July 20
  - Jessica de la Cruz, politician
  - James Dolan, computer security expert and co-developer of SecureDrop (d. 2017)
- July 21
  - Gregory Chaney, politician
  - Blake Lewis, singer/songwriter and beatboxer
  - Chrishell Stause, actress
- July 22 – Kevin Eakin, football player
- July 23 – Jacob Frey, politician, mayor of Minneapolis, Minnesota (2018–present)
- July 24
  - Mohammed Amer, Kuwaiti-born comedian
  - Steven Anderson, evangelist and founder of the New Independent Fundamentalist Baptist movement
  - Liz Climo, cartoonist, animator, children's book author, and illustrator
  - Summer Glau, actress
  - Vanessa Ray, actress
- July 26
  - Peter Depp, stand-up comedian, gay rights activist, anti-bullying activist, writer, and actor
  - Clifford Dukes, football player
- July 27 – Dash Snow, artist (died 2009)
- July 28
  - Billy Aaron Brown, actor
  - Jen Day, politician and weightlifter
  - Nithya Raman, Indian-born politician
  - Cole Williams, actor
- July 29
  - Jenna Edwards, beauty pageant title holder
  - Mark Estelle, American-born Canadian football player
  - Dyana Liu, actress
- July 30
  - Rob Emerson, mixed martial artist
  - Nicky Hayden, motorcycle racer (d. 2017)
- July 31
  - Vernon Carey, football player
  - Donald Cumming, actor, musician, and singer/songwriter
  - John Edwards, basketball player
  - M. Shadows, singer and frontman for Avenged Sevenfold
  - Eric Lively, actor

=== August ===
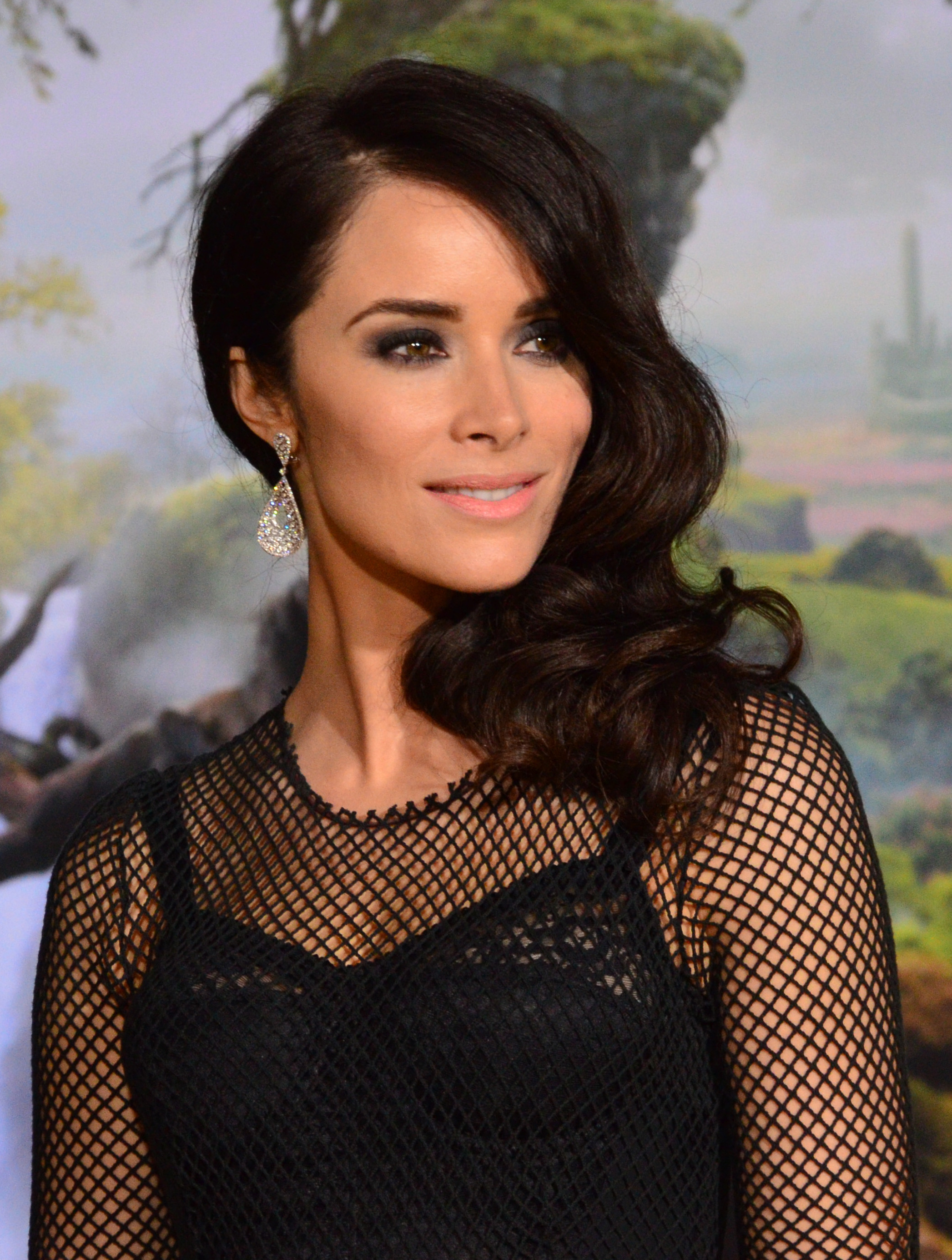
Abigail Spencer

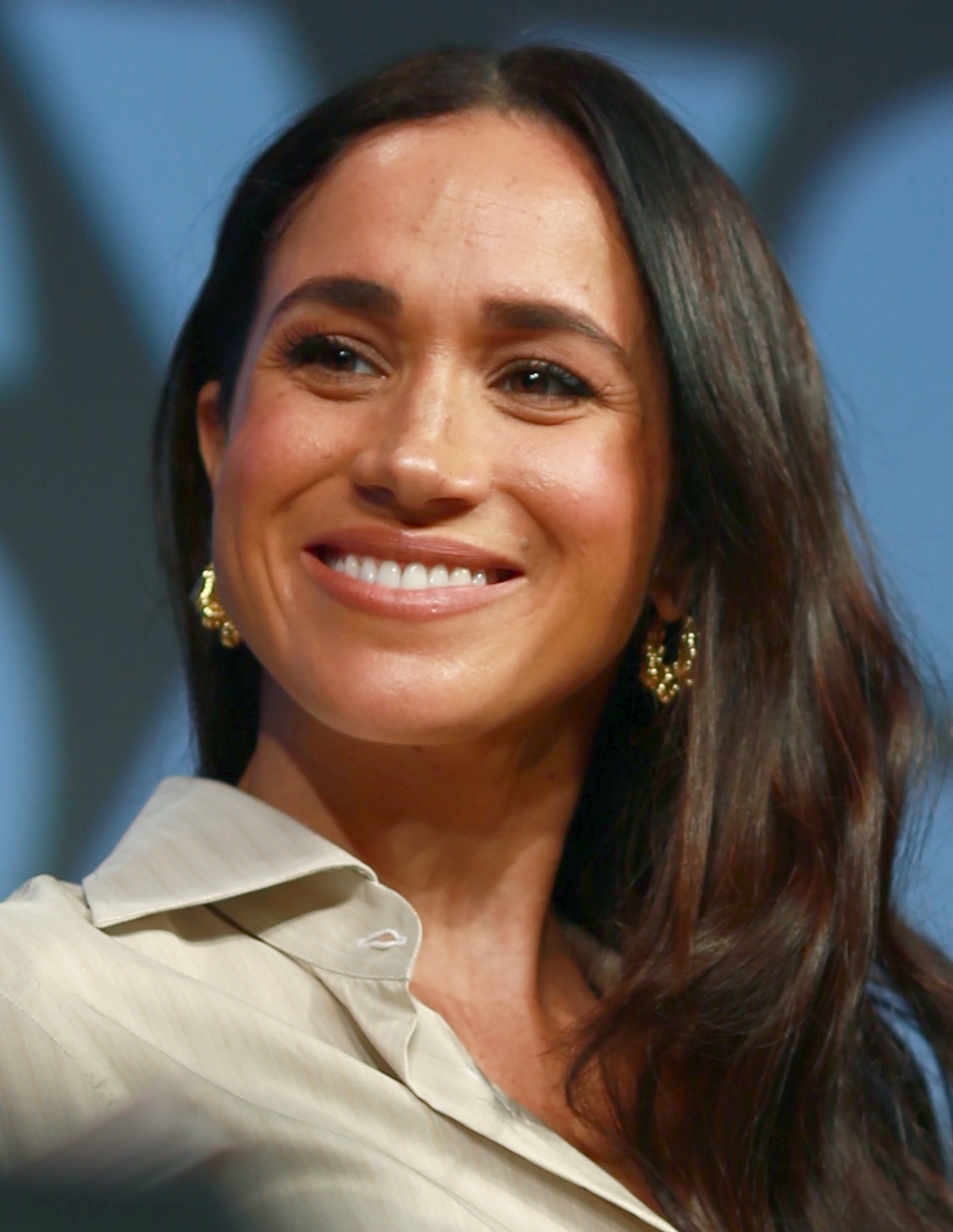
Meghan, Duchess of Sussex

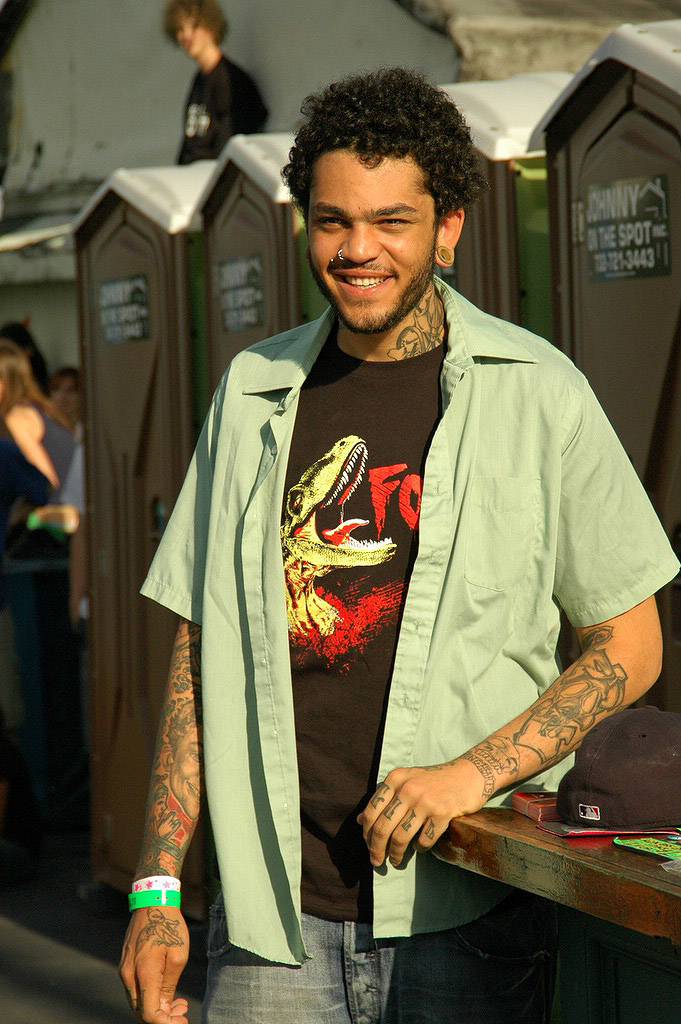
Travis McCoy

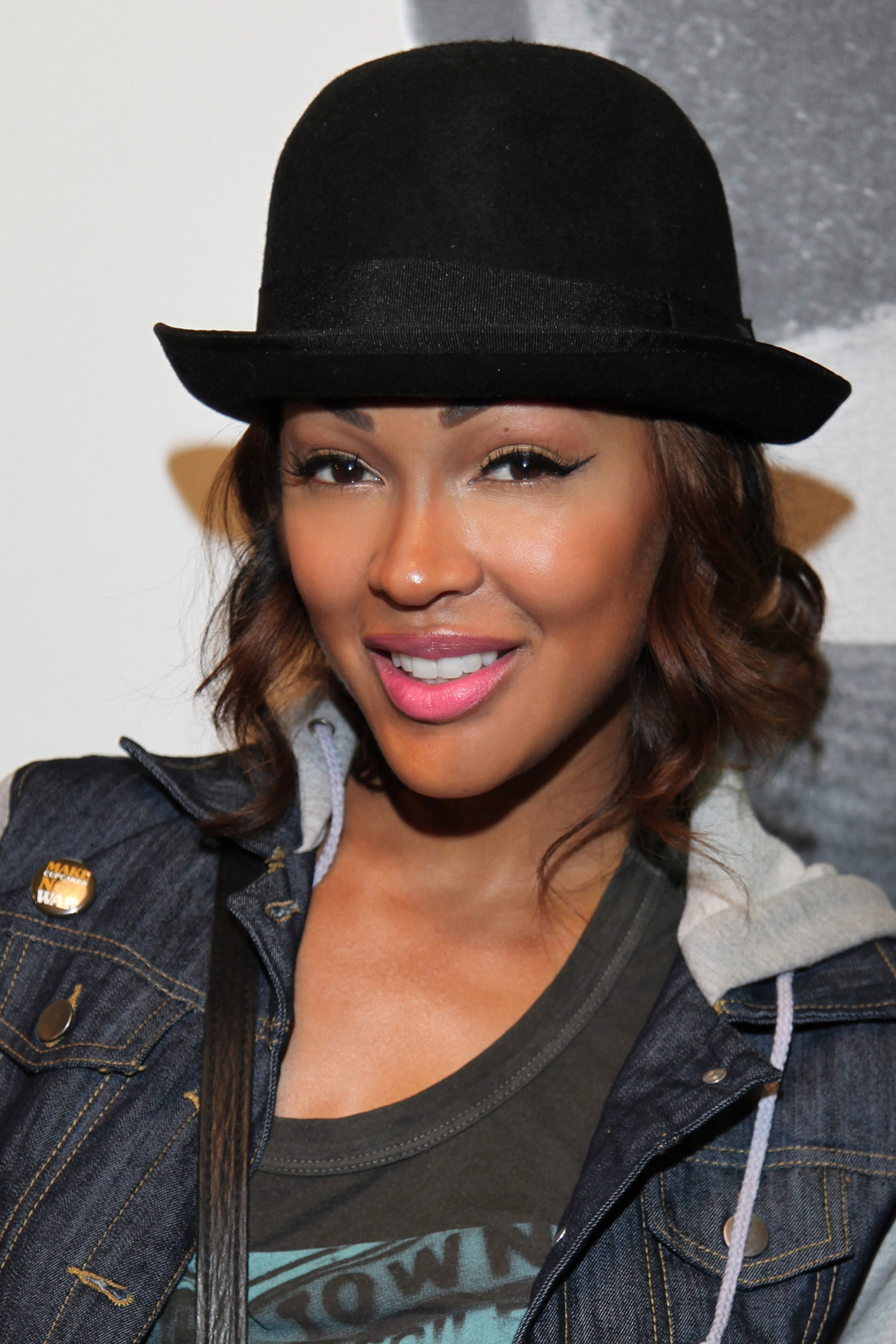
Meagan Good

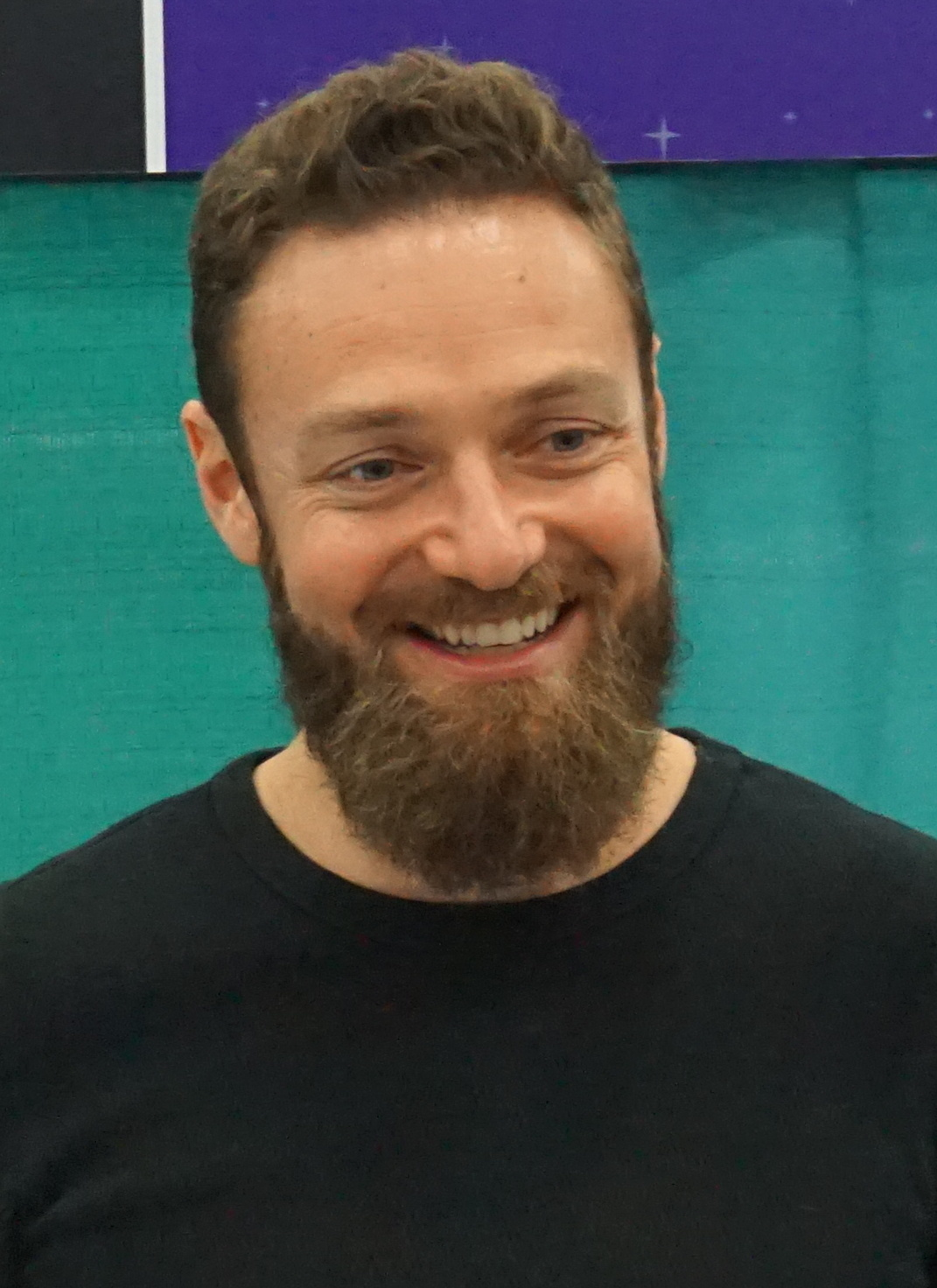
Ross Marquand

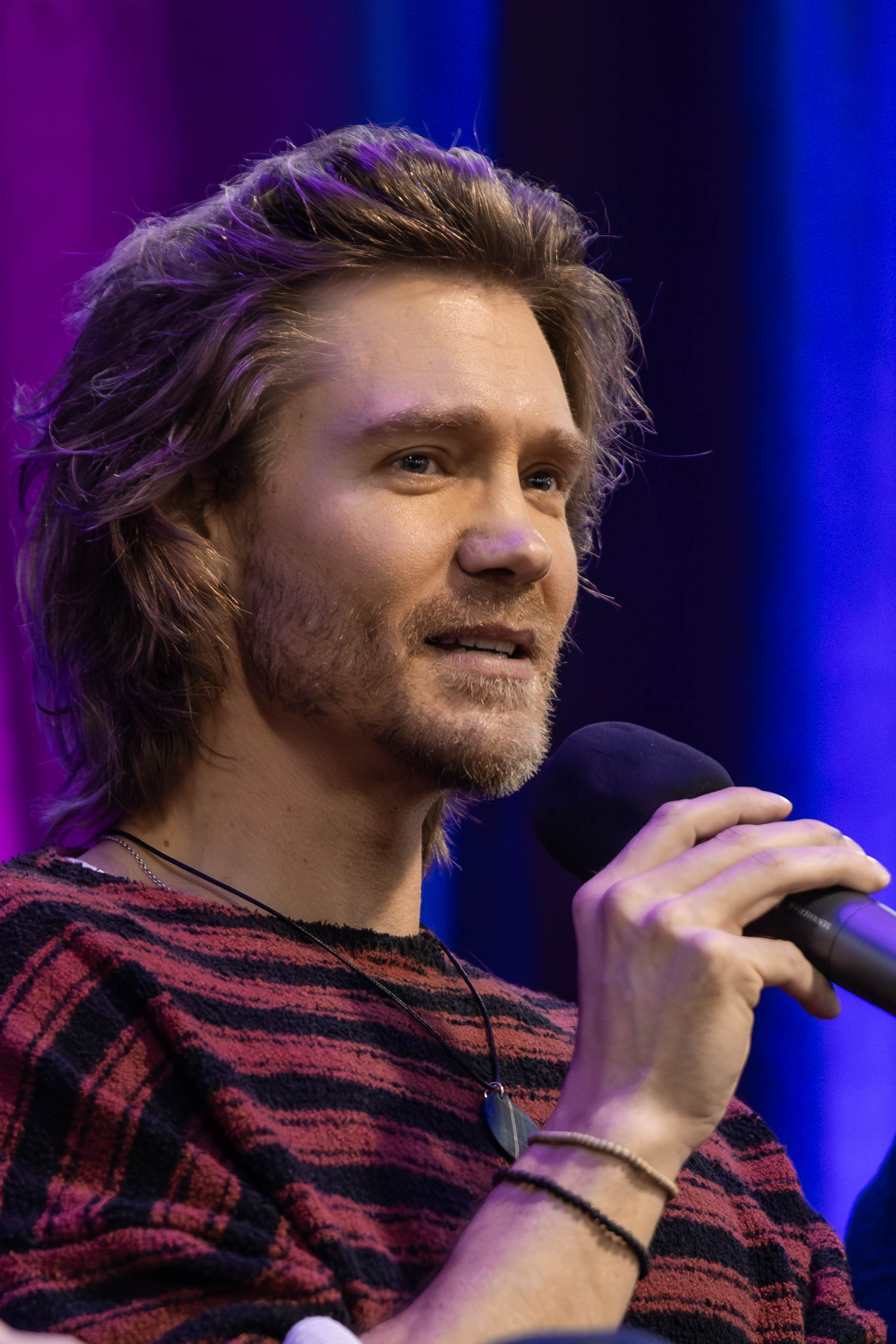
Chad Michael Murray

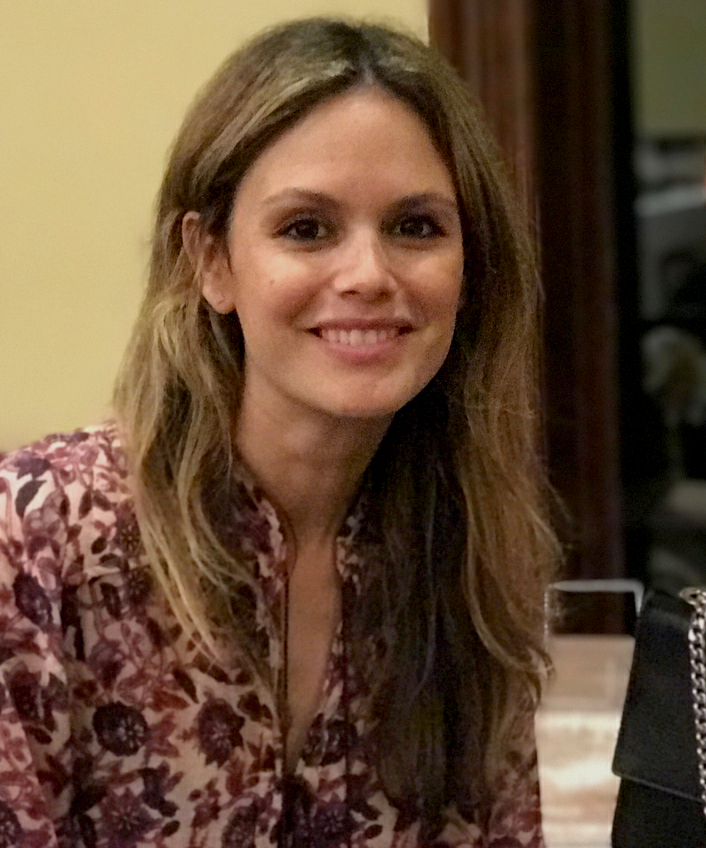
Rachel Bilson

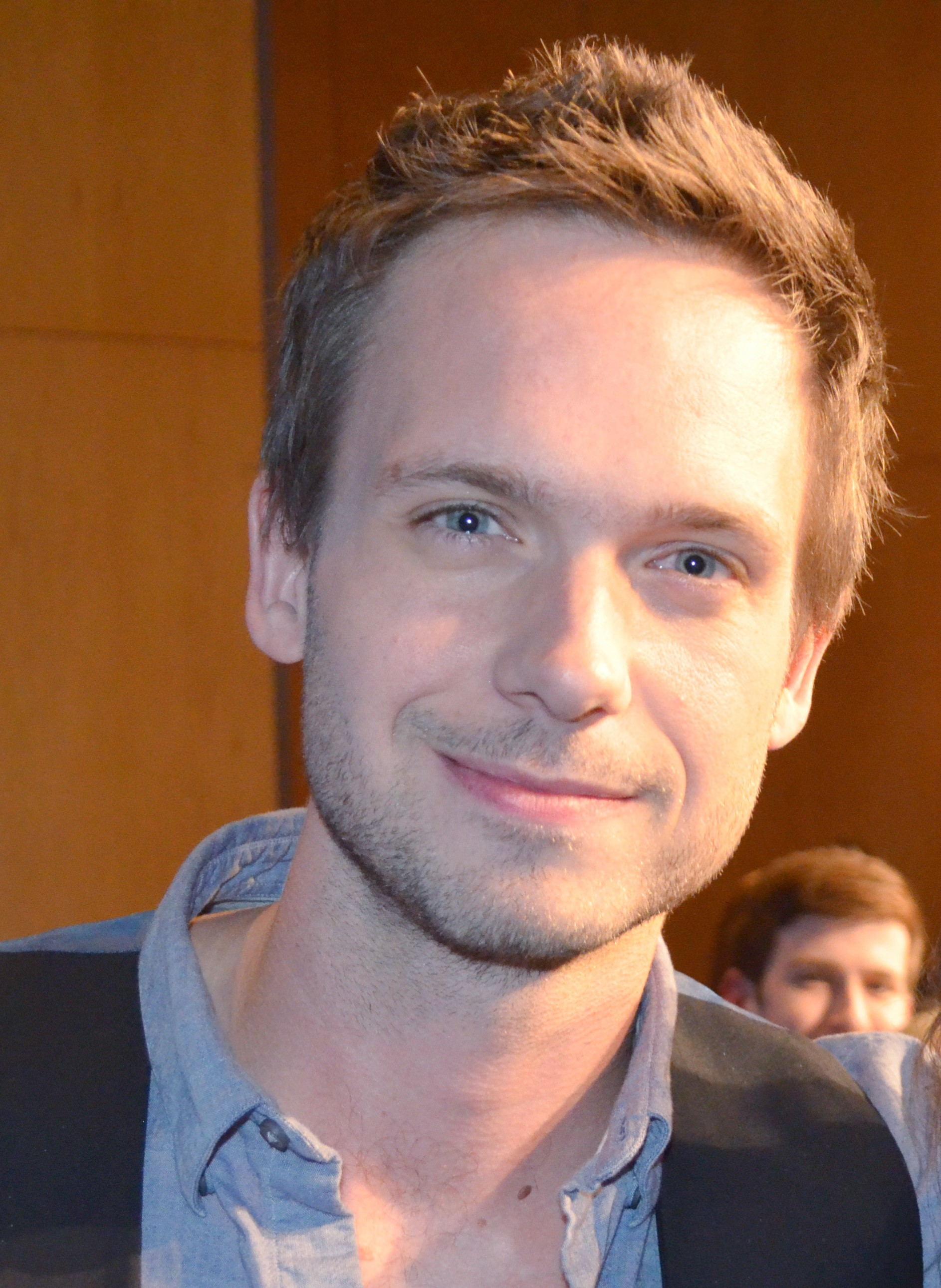
Patrick J. Adams

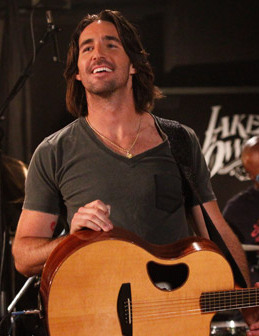
Jake Owen

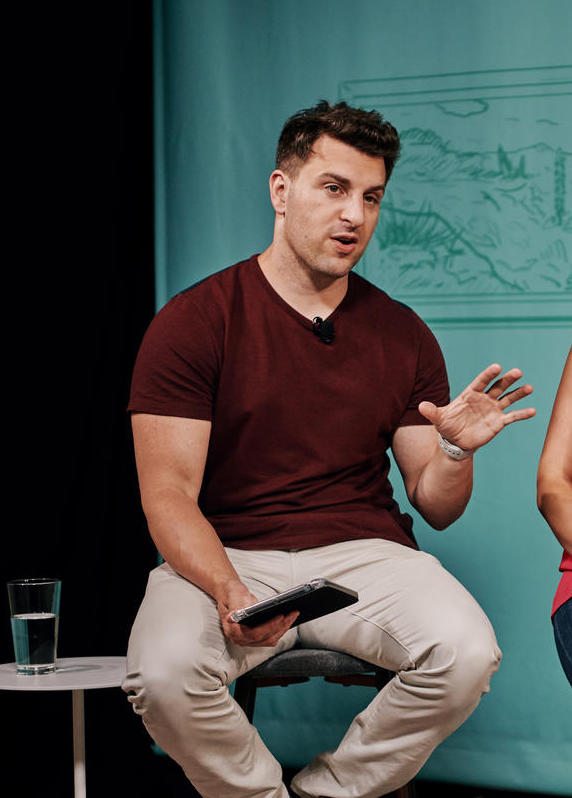
Brian Chesky

- August 1
  - Jeremy Cooney, politician
  - Jordan Wall, actor
- August 2
  - Dylan Dreyer, television meteorologist and news correspondent
  - Rich Edson, journalist for Fox News
  - Ebi Ere, American-born Nigerian basketball player
- August 3 – Travis Willingham, voice actor
- August 4
  - Amanda Congdon, vlogger and internet host
  - Andy Dillard, basketball player
  - Marques Houston, singer and actor (IMx)
  - Abigail Spencer, actress
  - Meghan, Duchess of Sussex, American-born actress and member of the British royal family
- August 5
  - Reilly Brown, comic book artist and writer
  - Carl Crawford, baseball player
  - Travie McCoy, alternative hip-hop artist and frontman for Gym Class Heroes
  - Rachel Scott, murder victim (d. 1999)
  - Jesse Williams, actor, director, producer, and activist
- August 6
  - Marc Cavosie, ice hockey player
  - Leslie Odom Jr., actor and singer
- August 7 – Randy Wayne, actor
- August 8
  - Meagan Good, actress
  - Henry Dillon, politician
- August 9 – Pam Dreyer, ice hockey player
- August 12
  - Matt Caldwell, politician
  - Steve Talley, actor
- August 13
  - Jarrod Alexander, rock drummer
  - Cory Doyne, baseball player
- August 14
  - Earl Barron, basketball player
  - Barrett Brown, journalist and founder of Project PM
  - Scott Lipsky, tennis player
  - Ray William Johnson, actor, comedian, rapper and YouTuber
- August 15
  - Nate Butler, songwriter, music producer, vocal producer, and recording artist
  - Adam Craig, mountain bike cyclist
- August 17 – Clinton Romesha, U.S. Army Veteran in the Afghan War and Medal of Honor recipient
- August 18 – Jeff Bourns, amputee tennis player
- August 19 – Percy Watson, wrestler and football player
- August 20
  - Epiphany, wrestler
  - Michael Rady, actor
  - Byron Saxton, wrestler, ring announcer, and commentator
- August 21
  - John Beck, football player and coaching consultant
  - Ross Thomas, actor
  - Cameron Winklevoss, investor, Olympic rower, and co-founder of Winklevoss Capital Management, Gemini cryptocurrency exchange, and ConnectU
  - Tyler Winklevoss, investor, Olympic rower, and co-founder of Winklevoss Capital Management, Gemini cryptocurrency exchange, and ConnectU
- August 22
  - Olivier Busquet, poker player
  - Justin R. Cox, soccer player and entrepreneur
  - Frank Davis, football player
  - Ross Marquand, actor
- August 23
  - Tony Dobbins, American-born Italian basketball player
  - Jaime Lee Kirchner, German-born actress
- August 24 – Chad Michael Murray, fashion model, actor and spokesperson
- August 25
  - Bobby Berk, reality star and interior designer
  - Rachel Bilson, actress
  - Andrew Chambliss, television writer and producer
- August 26
  - Jon Condo, football player
  - Kosha Dillz, rapper
  - Derek Edwardson, ice hockey player
  - Nico Muhly, contemporary classical composer
  - Karla Mosley, actress and singer
- August 27
  - Patrick J. Adams, Canadian-born actor
  - Sahba Aminikia, Iranian-born composer, artistic director, performer and educator
  - Allison Ball, politician
  - Aaron Espe, singer/songwriter, instrumentalist, and record producer
- August 28
  - Dan Deacon, electronic music composer
  - Ben Ferguson, political commentator
  - Charlie Frye, football player
  - Jake Owen, country singer
- August 29
  - Brian Chesky, co-founder and CEO of Airbnb
  - Brandon Trost, cinematographer, screenwriter, and director
- August 30 – Cole Escovedo, mixed martial artist
- August 31
  - T. J. Cummings, basketball player
  - Dennis Dove, baseball player
  - ForBiddeN, cosmetologist and MySpace Internet celebrity (d. 2017)

=== September ===
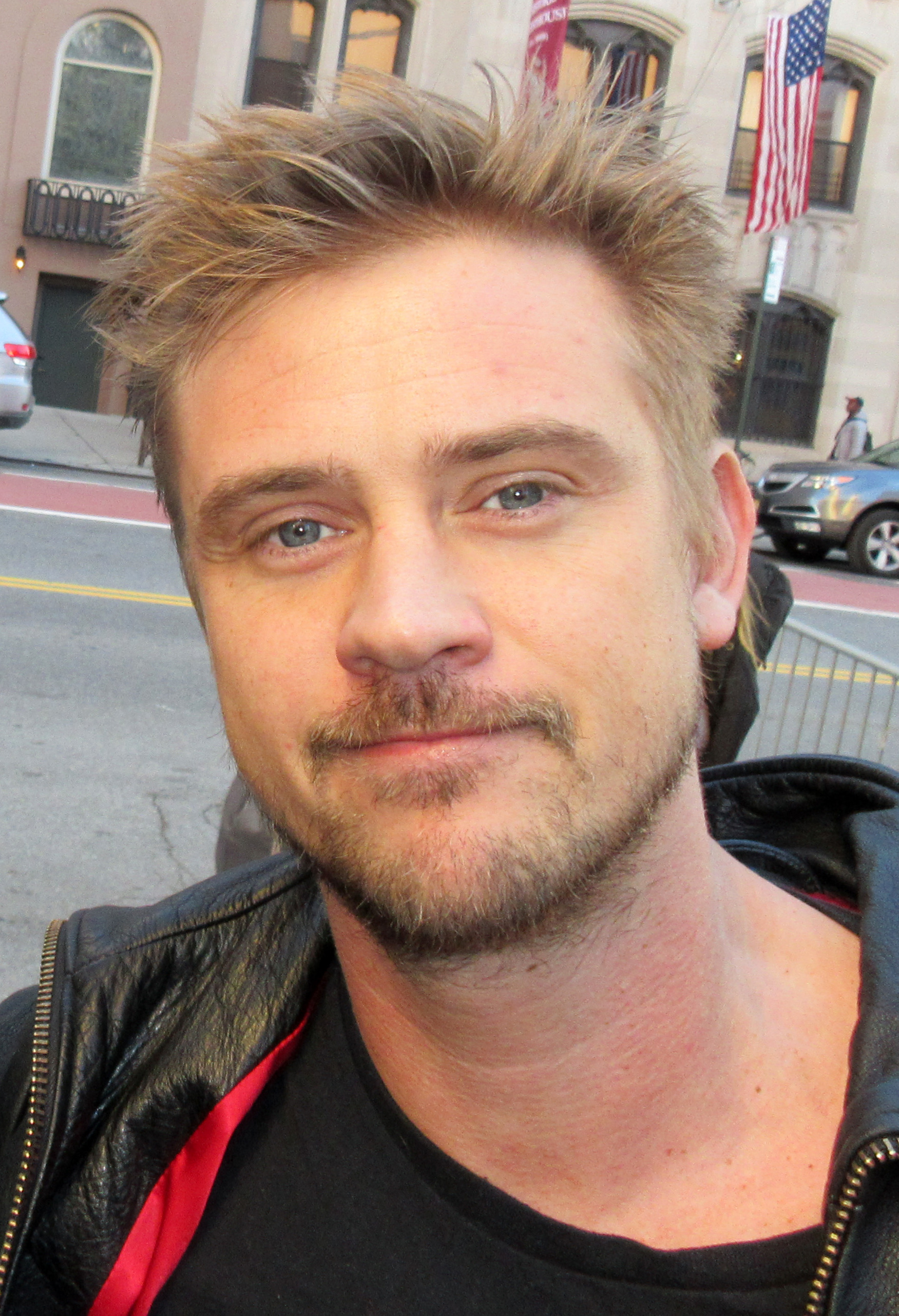
Boyd Holbrook

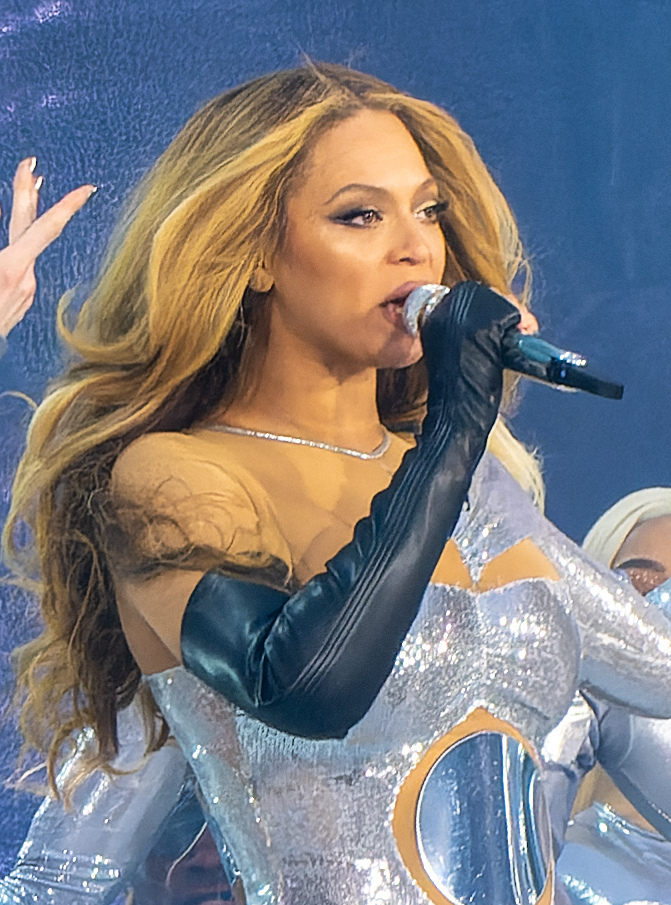
Beyoncé

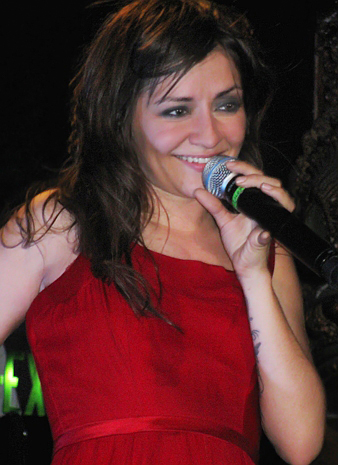
Lacey Sturm

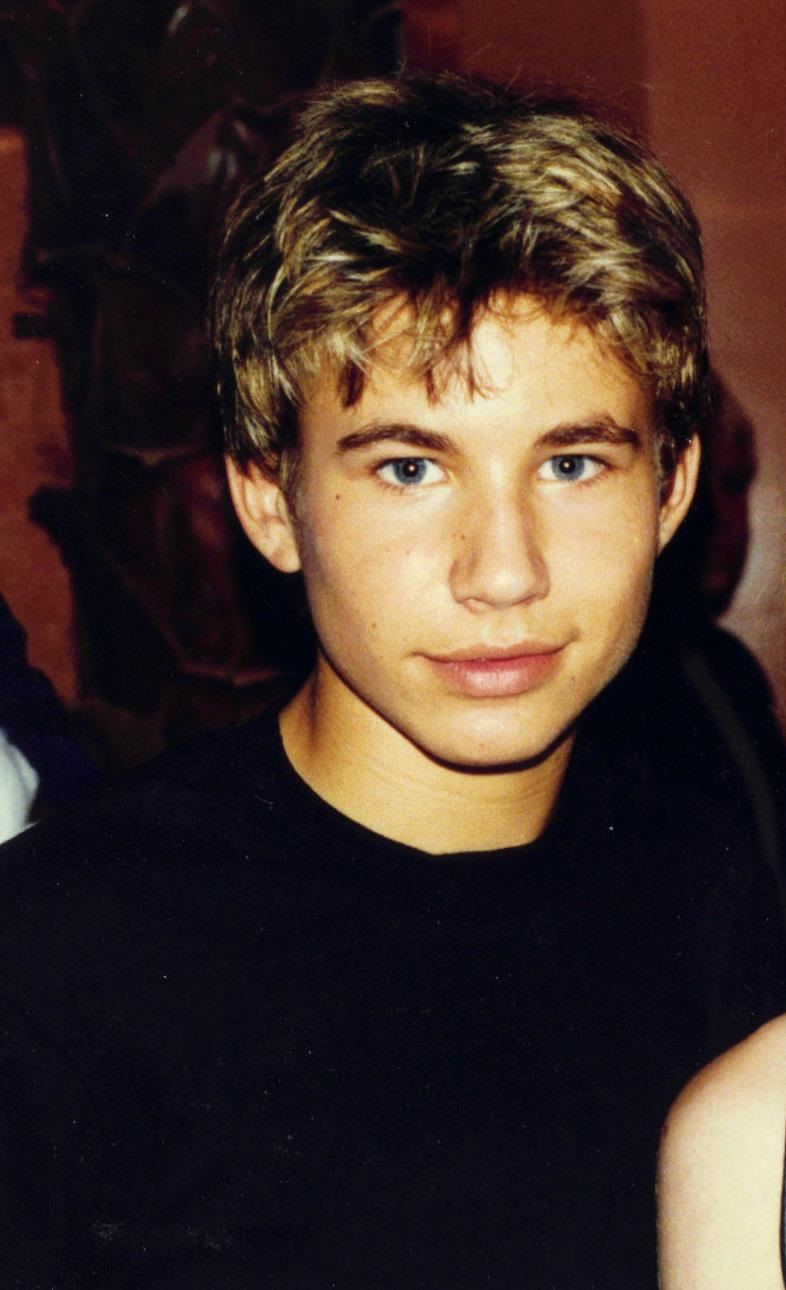
Jonathan Taylor Thomas

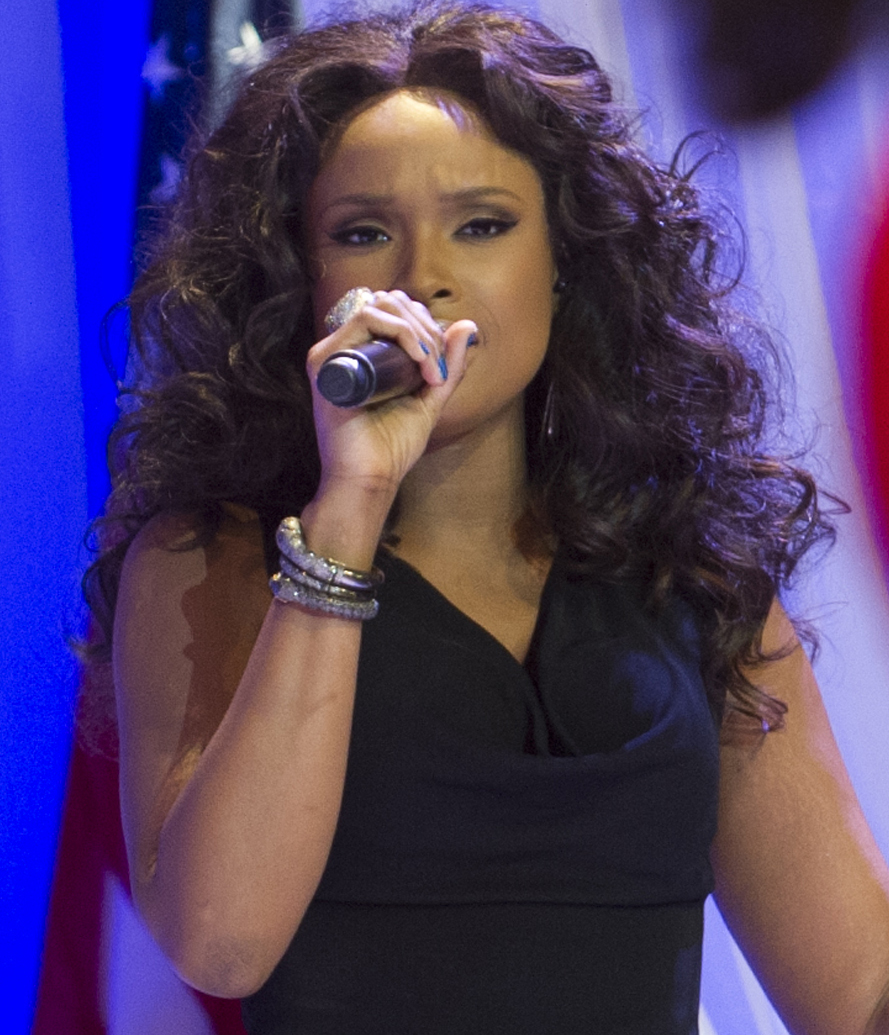
Jennifer Hudson

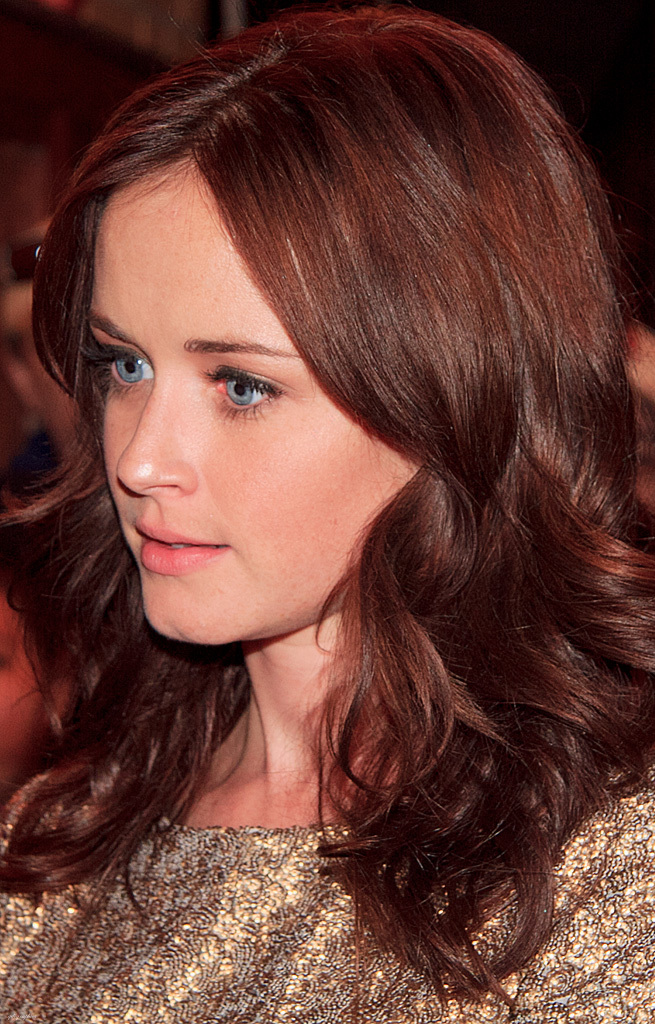
Alexis Bledel

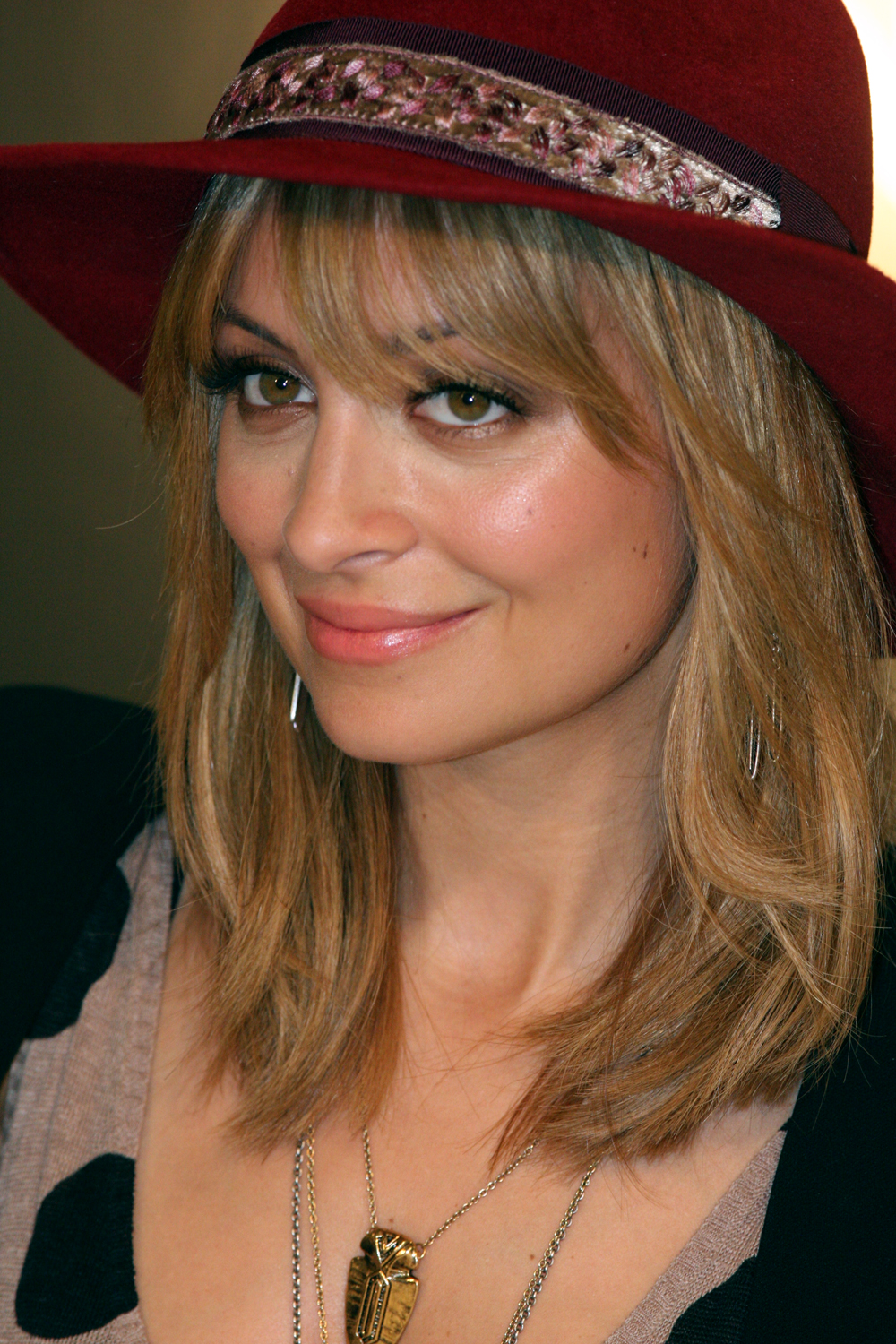
Nicole Richie

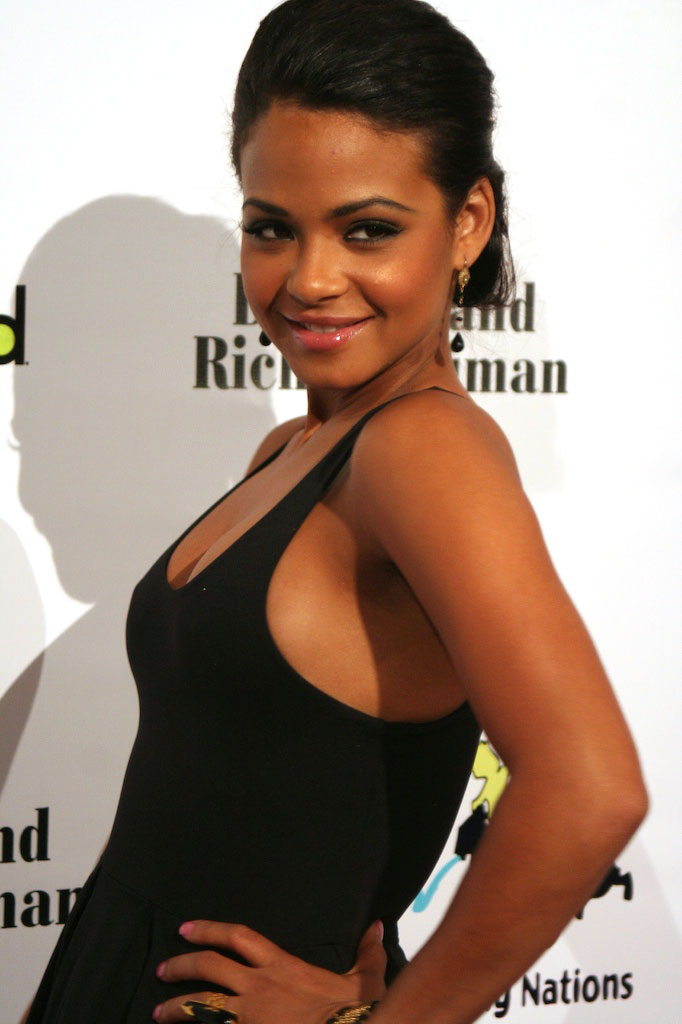
Christina Milian

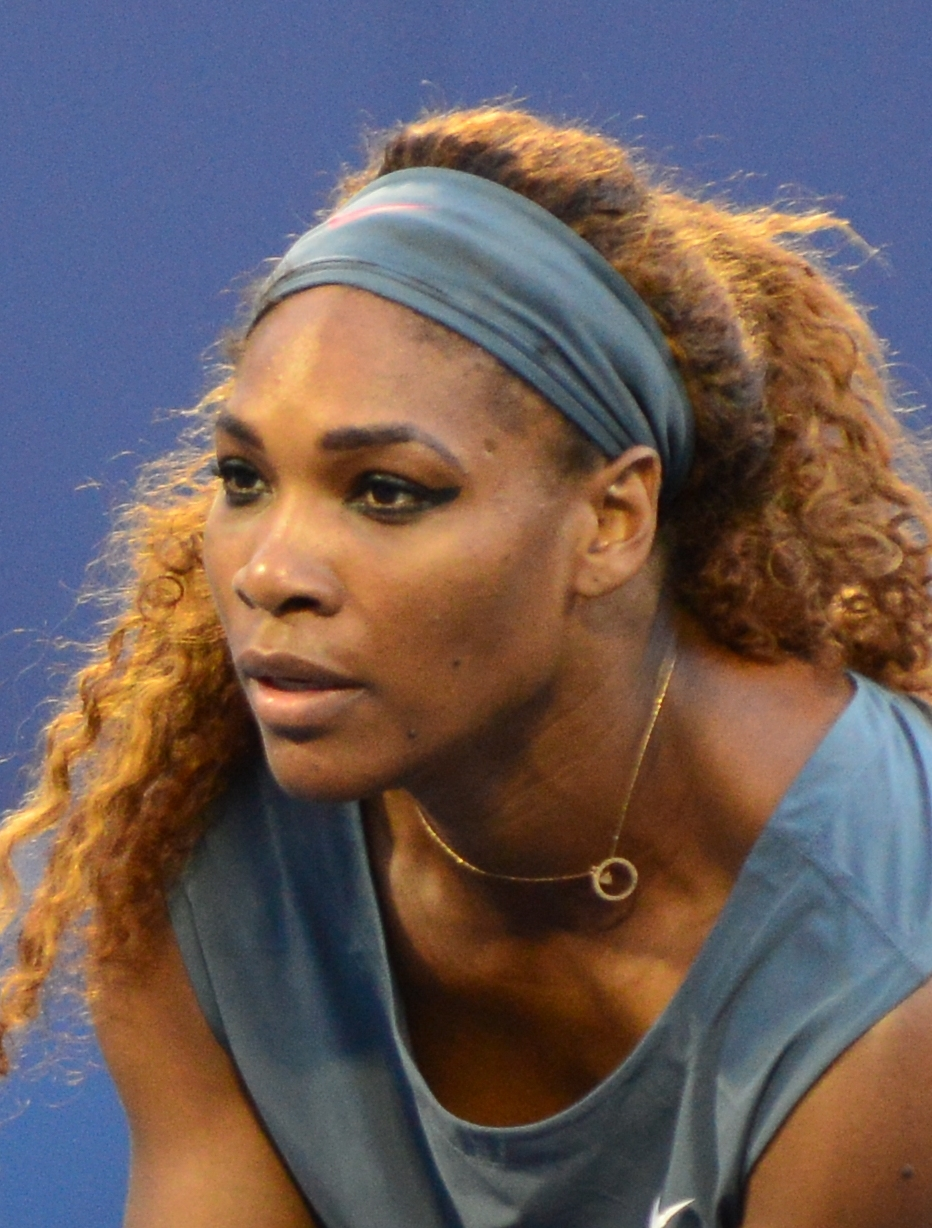
Serena Williams

- September 1
  - Boyd Holbrook, actor
  - Coyote Peterson, internet personality and wildlife educator
  - Clinton Portis, football player
- September 2 – Dan Ramos, politician (d. 2023)
- September 4
  - Beyoncé, singer/songwriter and member of Destiny's Child
  - Hagar Chemali, political satirist, writer, producer, television personality, and political commentator
  - Jero, American-born Japanese enka singer
  - Lacey Mosley, vocalist for Flyleaf
- September 5
  - Aaron Bay-Schuck, music industry executive and CEO and co-chairman of Warner Records
  - Lukas Biewald, entrepreneur and founder and CEO of Figure Eight Inc.
- September 7 – Jeremy Arel, YouTuber and Brazilian jiu-jitsu artist
- September 8
  - Dan Fredinburg, Google executive
  - Jonathan Taylor Thomas, actor
- September 9
  - Jessica D. Aber, attorney (d. 2025)
  - Basil Dannebohm, politician
  - Julie Gonzalo, Argentine-born actress and producer
- September 11
  - Benjamin Downing, politician
  - Aneesa Ferreira, television personality
  - Hallowicked, wrestler
  - Dylan Klebold, mass murderer (died 1999)
  - Charles Kelley, country singer/songwriter and founding member of Lady Antebellum
- September 12
  - Jennifer Hudson, singer and actress
  - Hosea Chanchez, actor
- September 13 – EJay Day, singer/songwriter
- September 14
  - Cody Clark baseball player
  - Ashley Roberts, singer and dancer for The Pussycat Dolls
- September 15
  - Daniel Brummel, singer/songwriter, composer, producer, and multi-instrumentalist
  - Ben Schwartz, actor, voice actor, comedian, writer, director, and producer
- September 16
  - Alexis Bledel, actress and model
  - Patrick Dideum, freestyle swimmer
- September 18 – Jennifer Tisdale, actress
- September 19
  - Ahmad Abousamra, Syrian-born terrorist (d. 2017)
  - Scott Baker, baseball player
  - Atari Bigby, football player
  - Scott Bradlee, musician, pianist, and YouTuber
- September 20 – Shemia Fagan, politician
- September 21 – Nicole Richie, actress, singer, and socialite
- September 22
  - Silas Daniels, football player
  - Ashley Eckstein, actress, voice actress, and fashion designer
  - Adam Lazzara, singer/songwriter and frontman for Taking Back Sunday
- September 23
  - Evan Brewer, bassist
  - Brandon Victor Dixon, actor, singer, and theatrical producer
  - Misti Traya, actress
- September 24
  - Leigh Bodden, football player
  - Ryan Briscoe, Australian-born racing driver
  - Andrew Leeds, actor, comedian, and writer
  - Kris McCray, mixed martial artist
- September 25
  - Rocco Baldelli, baseball player
  - Jason Bergmann, baseball player
  - Nat Cassidy, actor, writer, and musician
  - Jennifer Carroll Foy, politician
  - Van Hansis, actor
  - Lee Norris, actor
  - Perfume Genius, singer/songwriter and musician
  - Shane Tutmarc, singer/songwriter and frontman for Dolour
- September 26
  - Alondra Cano, politician
  - Christina Milian, R&B singer and actress
  - Serena Williams, tennis player
- September 27
  - Cytherea, pornographic actress and model
  - Mike Esposito, baseball player
  - Anand Giridharadas, writer
- September 28
  - Greg Anderson, pianist, composer, video producer, and writer
  - David Baas, football player
  - Melissa Claire Egan, actress
- September 29
  - Shay Astar, actress and singer/songwriter
  - Atiyyah Ellison, football player
- September 30
  - Parks Bonifay, wakeboarder
  - Rachael Eubanks, politician
  - Dominique Moceanu, Romanian-born gymnast
  - Ashleigh Aston Moore, child actress (d. 2007)

=== October ===
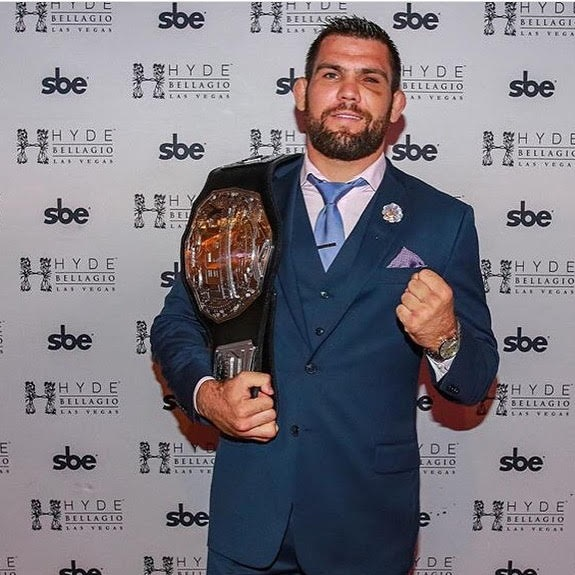
Robert Drysdale

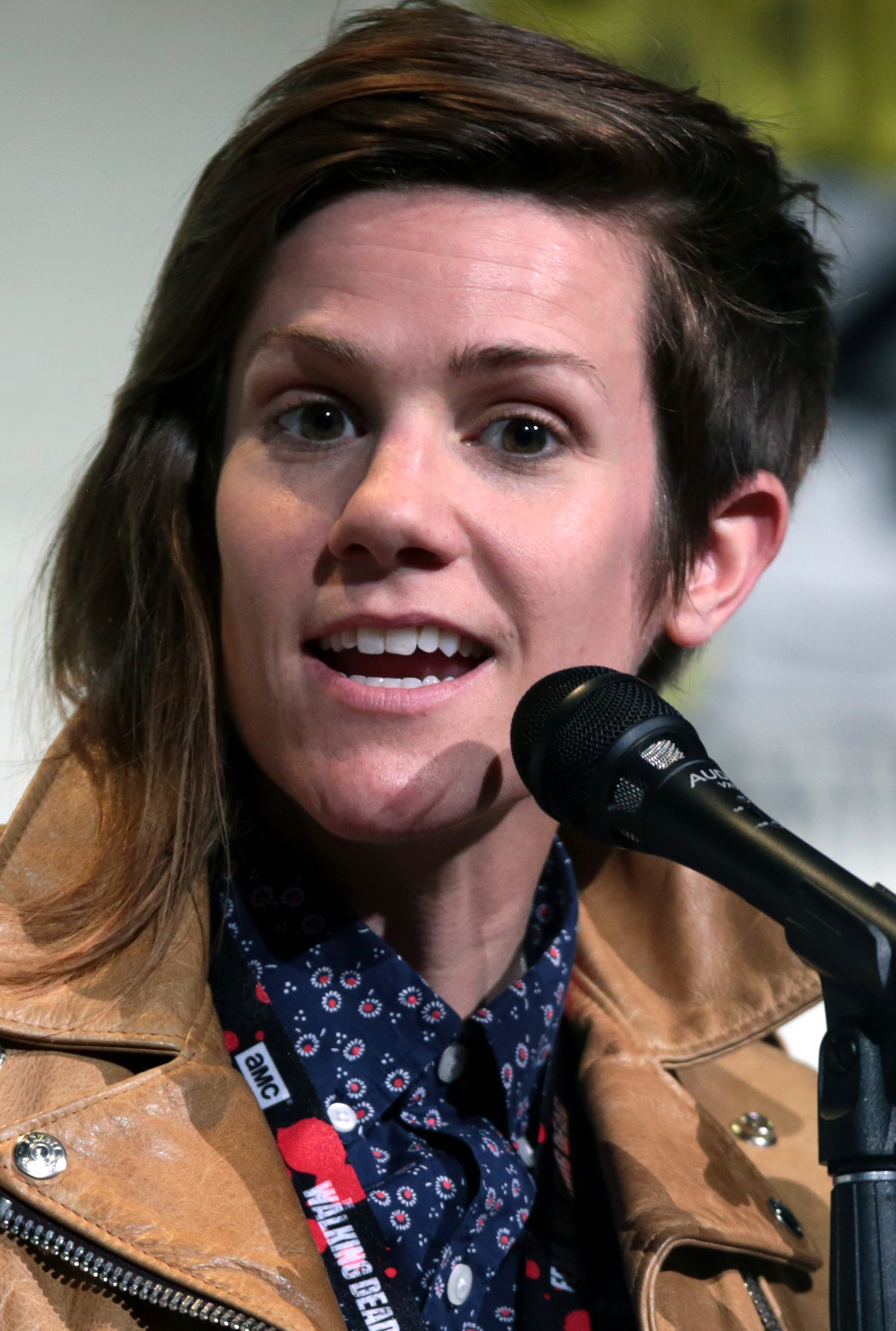
Cameron Esposito

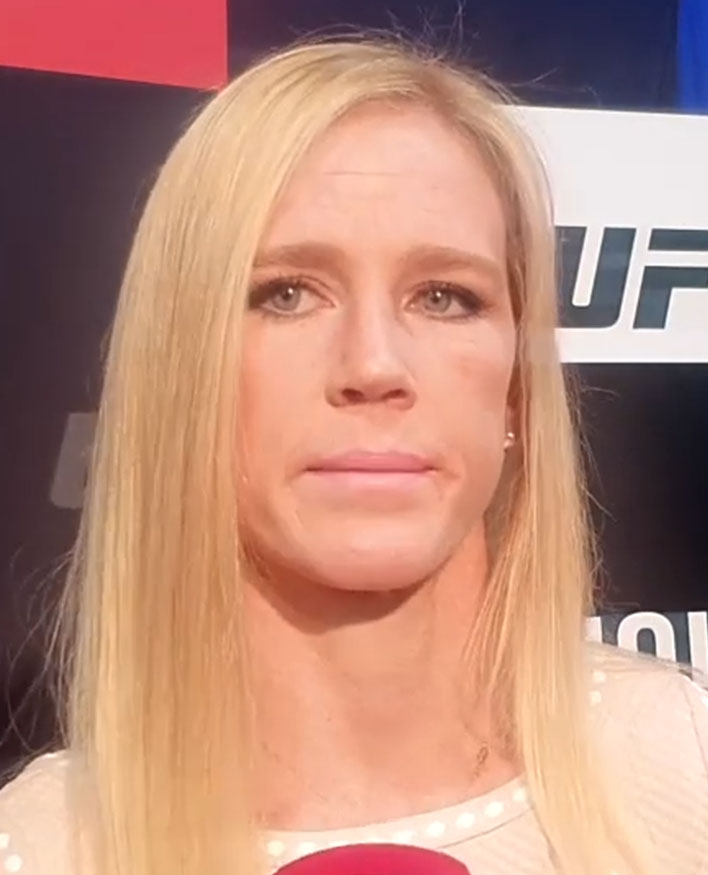
Holly Holm

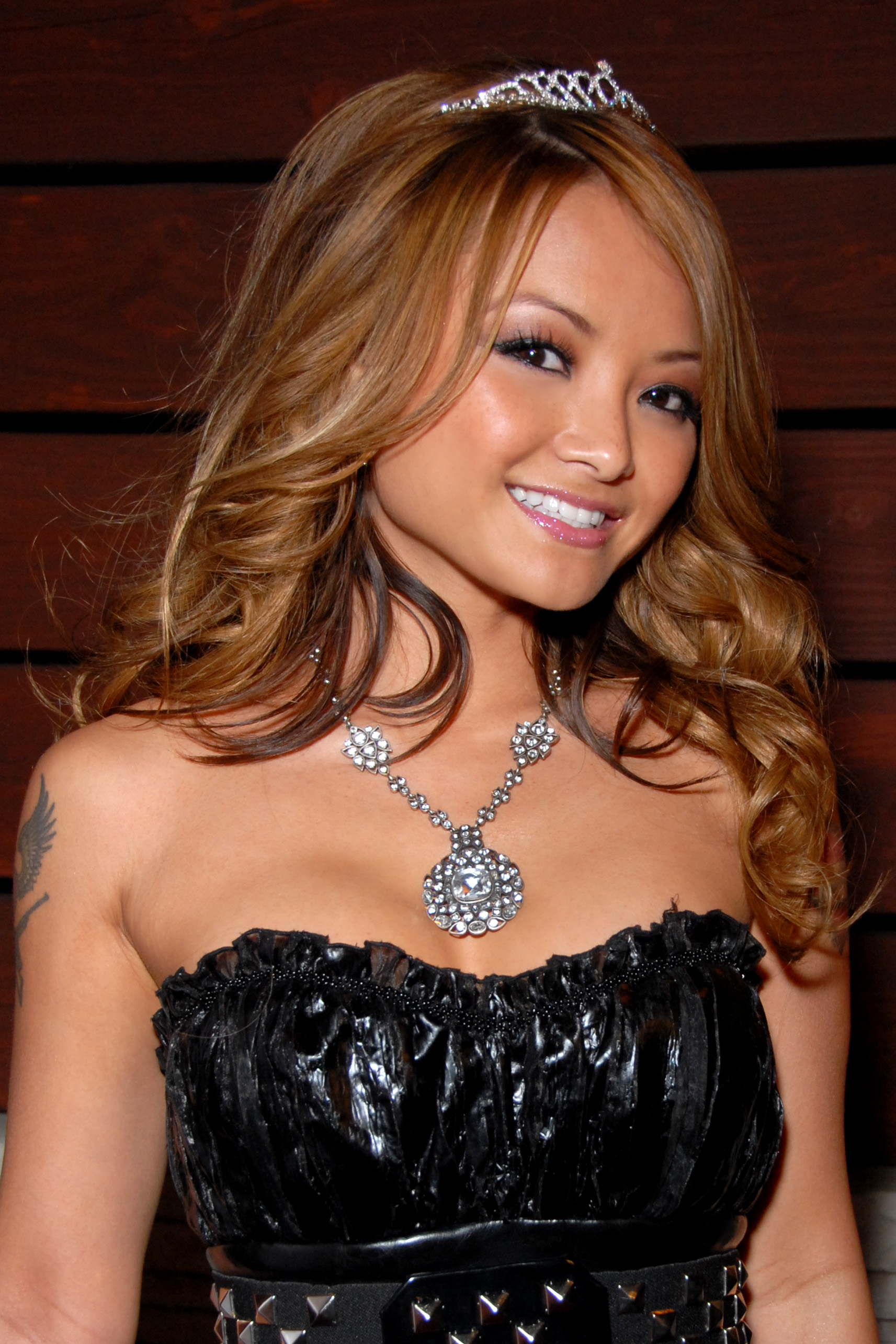
Tila Tequila

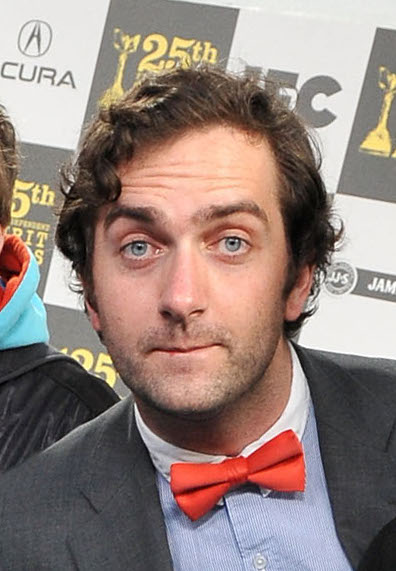
Sam Brown

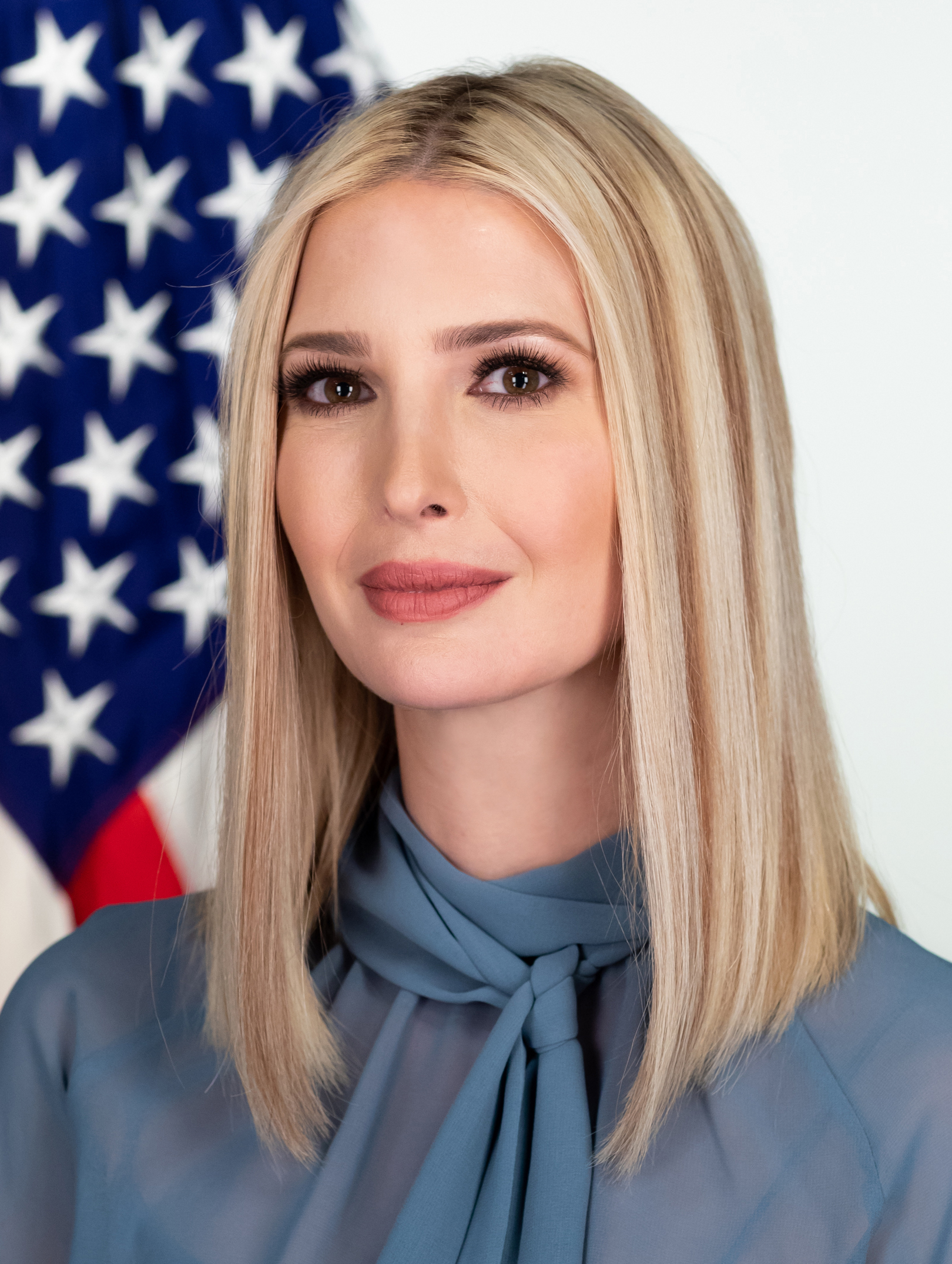
Ivanka Trump

- October 2
  - Erwin Dudley, basketball player
  - Peter Evans, trumpeter
- October 3
  - Seth Gabel, actor
  - Matthew O. Williams, U.S. Army veteran in the Afghan War and Medal of Honor recipient
- October 4 – Curtis Deloatch, football player
- October 5
  - Jeanette Antolin, gymnast
  - Isaiah Ekejiuba, Nigerian-born football player
  - Robert Drysdale, Brazilian-born mixed martial artist
- October 7
  - Dria, singer/songwriter
  - Austin Eubanks, motivational speaker (d. 2019)
- October 8 – Brett Dietz, football player and coach
- October 9
  - Zachery Ty Bryan, actor
  - Tad Hilgenbrink, actor
  - Phillip LaRue, singer/songwriter and producer
  - Darius Miles, basketball player
- October 10
  - Maverick Carter, marketing businessman and media personality
  - Lisa Davies, model
  - Jonathan Evans, football player
  - Michael Oliver, actor
- October 12
  - Jonathan Babineaux, football player
  - Abigail DeVille, sculptor and installation artist
  - Tom Guiry, actor
  - Brian J. Smith, actor
- October 13
  - Taylor Buchholz, baseball player
  - Jared Emerson-Johnson, video game music composer, sound designer, voice director, and voice actor
- October 14 – Boof Bonser, baseball player
- October 15
  - Keyshia Cole, singer/songwriter and television personality
  - Abram Elam, football player
- October 16
  - Frankie Edgar, mixed martial artist
  - Boyd Melson, boxer
- October 17
  - Cameron Esposito, actor, comedian, and podcaster
  - Holly Holm, mixed martial artist
- October 20
  - Zach Conine, politician
  - Willis McGahee, football player
- October 21
  - Brian Claybourn, football player
  - Kate Gallego, politician, mayor of Phoenix, Arizona (2019–present)
- October 22
  - John Boyd, actor
  - Anthony Brown, gospel musician
  - Michael Fishman, actor
- October 24 – Tila Tequila, model and television personality
- October 25
  - Josh Henderson, actor, model, and singer
  - Austin John, singer/songwriter and frontman for Hinder (2001–2013)
- October 26 – Sam Brown, actor and comedian
- October 28
  - Sean Considine, football player
  - Dawen, singer/songwriter
  - Noah Galloway, wounded Army Soldier, motivational speaker, and Dancing with the Stars contestant
- October 29 – Amanda Beard, Olympic swimmer
- October 30
  - Chris Clemons, football player
  - Fiona Dourif, actress, daughter of Brad Dourif
  - Shaun Sipos, Canadian-born actor
  - Ivanka Trump, model, advisor, and daughter of the 45th president of the United States, Donald Trump
- October 31
  - Doveman, pianist, producer, and singer
  - Frank Iero, guitarist for My Chemical Romance
  - Mike Napoli, baseball player

=== November ===
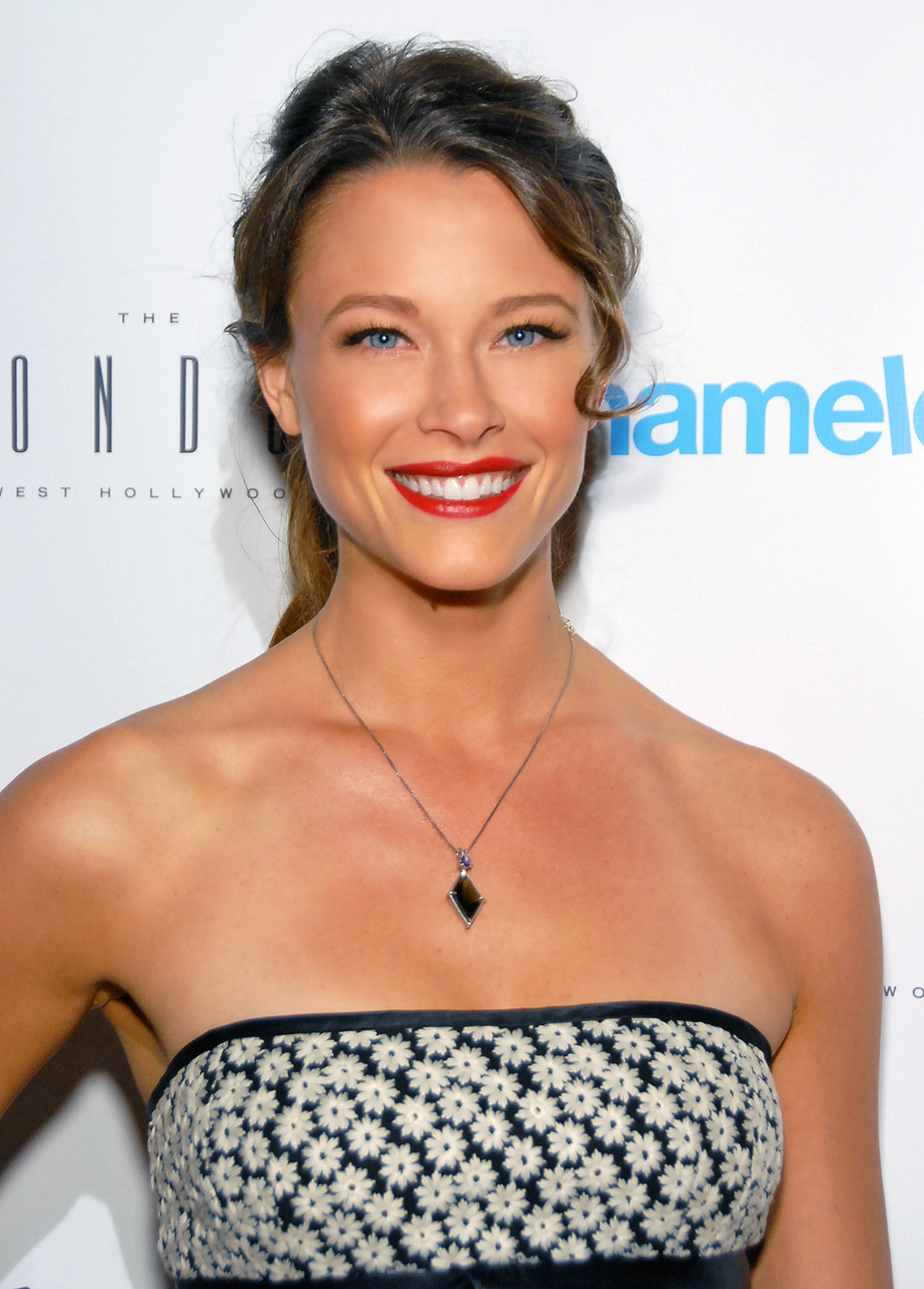
Scottie Thompson

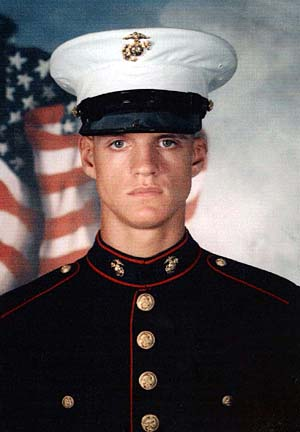
Jason Dunham

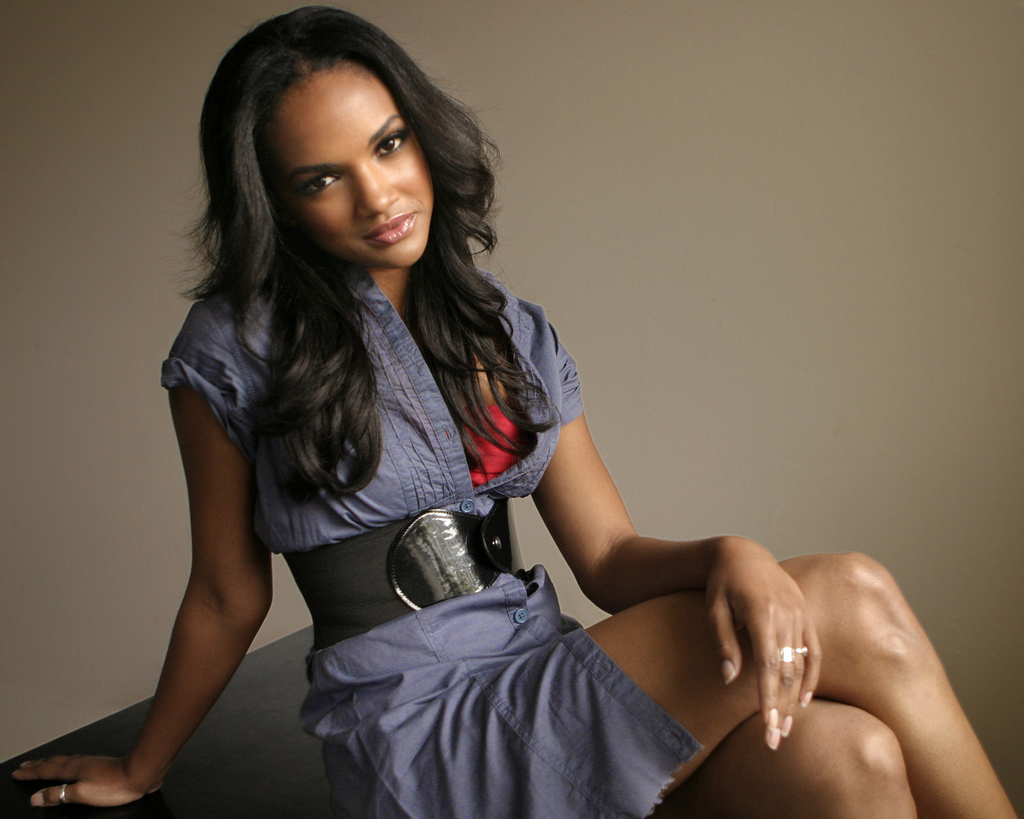
Mekia Cox

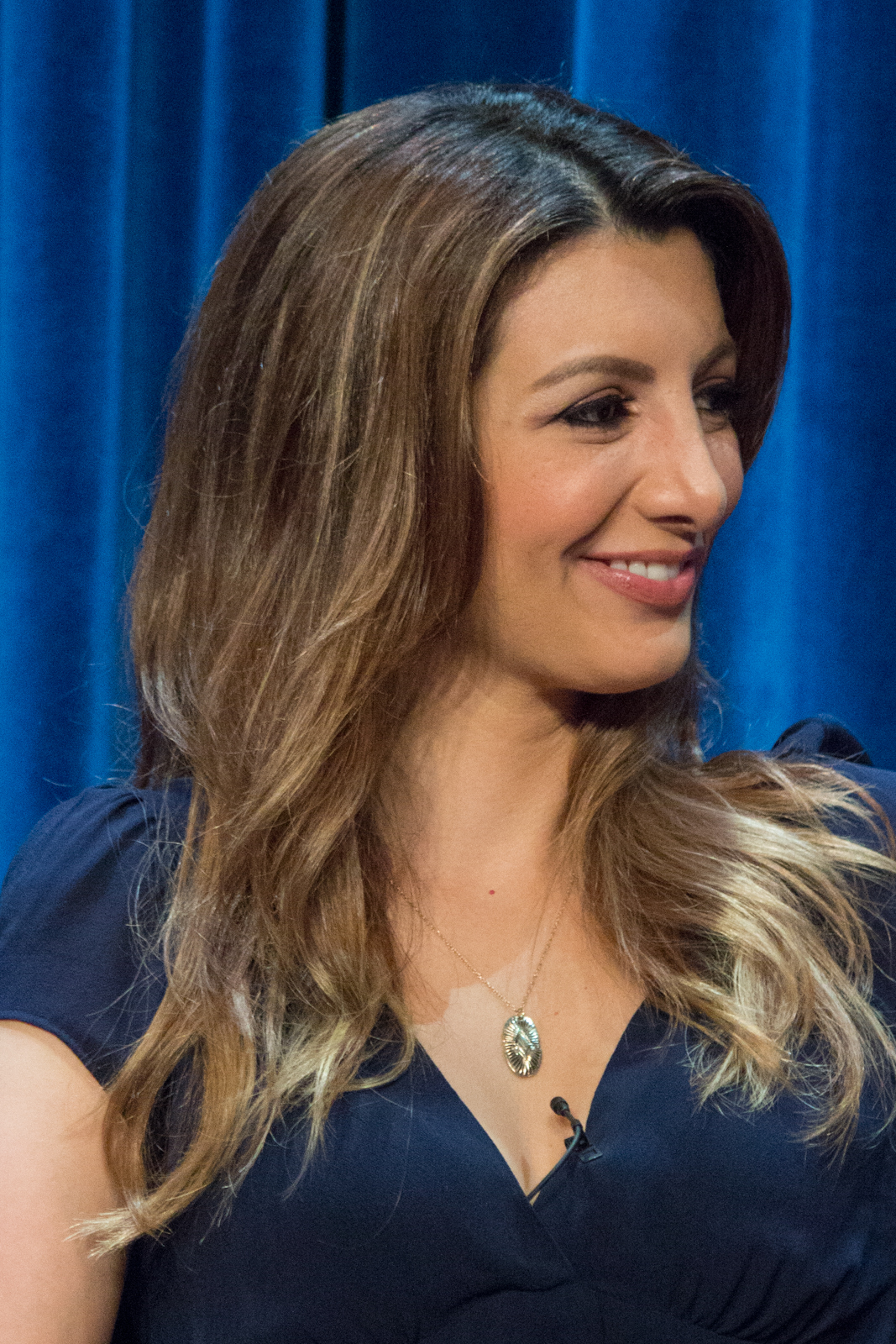
Nasim Pedrad

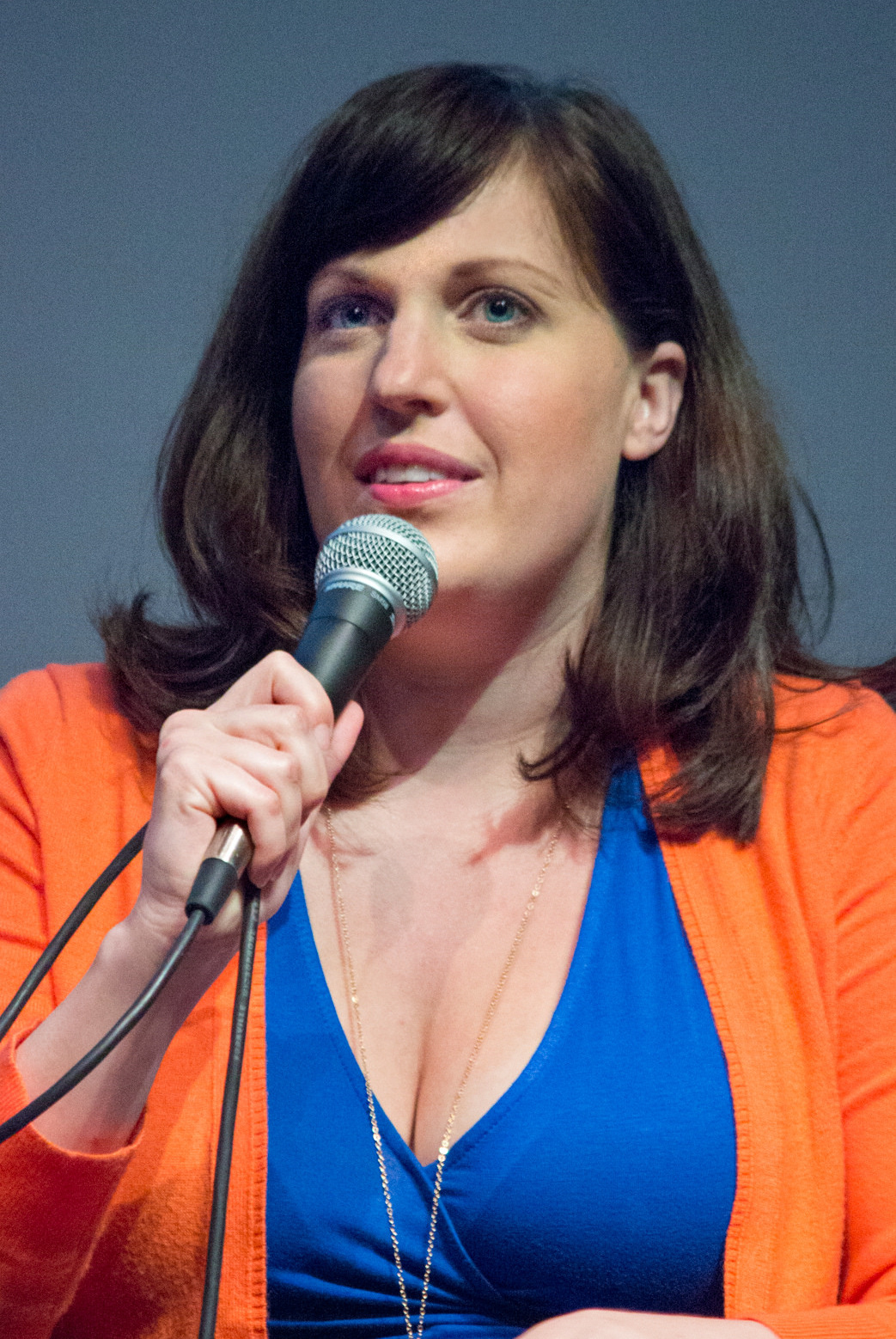
Allison Tolman

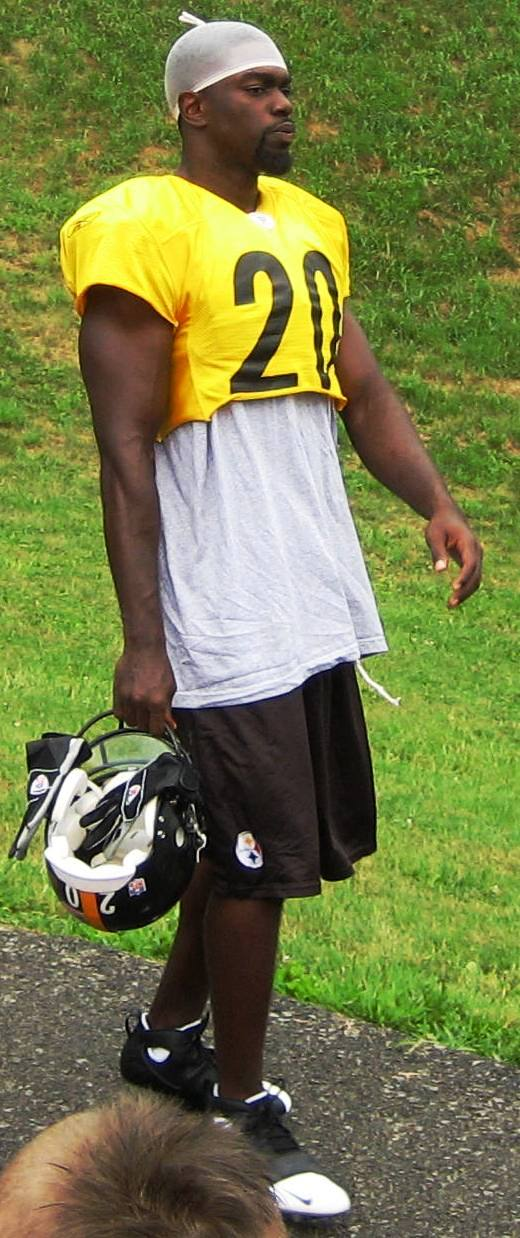
Bryant McFadden

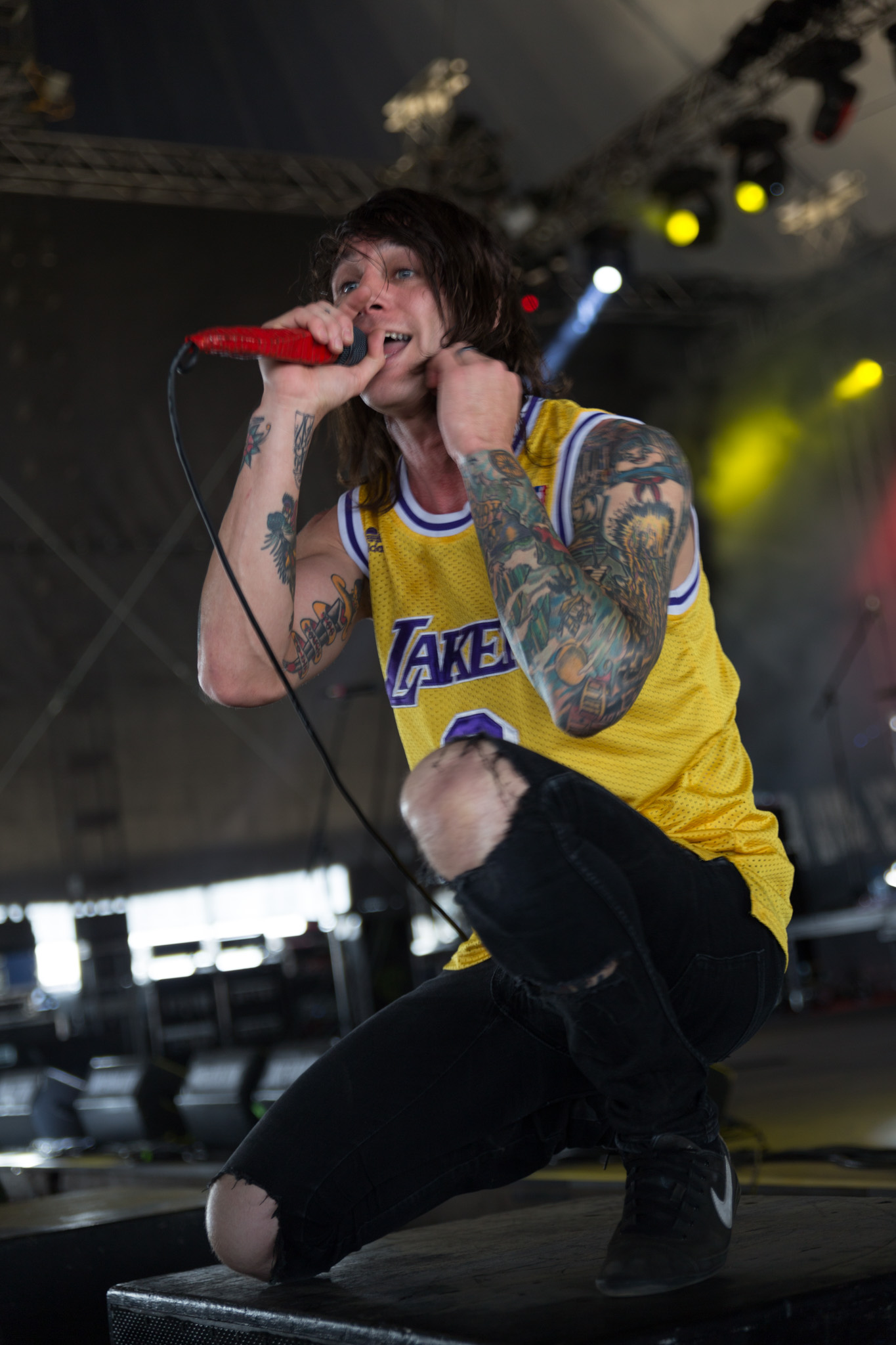
Beau Bokan

- November 1
  - Matt Jones, actor and comedian
  - LaTavia Roberson, singer, originally of Destiny's Child
- November 2 – Ai, Japanese-born singer/songwriter
- November 3
  - Blair Chenoweth, beauty queen
  - Karlos Dansby, football player
  - Jackie Gayda, wrestler
  - Travis Richter, singer and guitar for From First to Last
- November 4
  - Robert Bingaman, artist
  - Vince Wilfork, football player
- November 5
  - Regulo Caro, singer/songwriter
  - Megan Hauserman, model and television personality
- November 6
  - Cassie Bernall, murder victim of the Columbine High School massacre (d. 1999)
  - Graham Colton, singer/songwriter
  - Vicente Escobedo, boxer
- November 8
  - Brad Davis, soccer player
  - Jocelin Donahue, actress
  - Alonzo Ephraim, football player
  - Azura Skye, actress
- November 9
  - Eyedea, musician, rapper, and poet (d. 2010)
  - Sarah Godlewski, politician
  - Scottie Thompson, actress
- November 10
  - Jeff Darlington, ESPN television reporter
  - Jason Dunham, Medal of Honor recipient (died 2004)
  - Ryback, wrestler
- November 11 – Susan Kelechi Watson, actress
- November 13
  - Ryan Bertin, wrestler and coach
  - Wesley Hunt, military veteran and politician
  - Kirsten Price, model and adult film star
  - Rivkah, author and illustrator
- November 14
  - Vanessa Bayer, actress and comedian
  - Zach Dailey, tennis player
- November 15
  - Chris Dixon, football player
  - Drew Hodgdon, football player
- November 16 – Caitlin Glass, voice actress
- November 17
  - Tremmell Darden, basketball player
  - Rocsi Diaz, Honduran-born television and radio personality, model, and actress
  - Doug Walker, Italian-born internet film critic, comedian, and actor (Nostalgia Critic)
- November 18
  - Mekia Cox, actress and dancer
  - Tim DeChristopher, climate activist and co-founder of Peaceful Uprising
  - Nasim Pedrad, Iranian-born actress and comedian
  - Maggie Stiefvater, author
  - Allison Tolman, actress
  - Christina Vidal, actress and singer
- November 19 – Marcus Banks, basketball player
- November 20 – Carlos Boozer, basketball player
- November 21
  - Adimchinobe Echemandu, Nigerian-born football player
  - Bryant McFadden, football player
- November 22 – Rolando Delgado, mixed martial artist and trainer
- November 24
  - Krystal Ball, political commentator and television host
  - Jared Cohen, businessman and CEO of Jigsaw
  - Terrance Dotsy, football player
- November 25
  - Barbara Pierce Bush, daughter of U.S. President George W. Bush
  - Jenna Bush Hager, daughter of U.S. President George W. Bush
  - Chevon Troutman, basketball player
- November 26
  - Julian Dorio, drummer for The Whigs
  - Valerie Waugaman, actress, television personality, and bodybuilder
- November 28
  - Erick Rowan, wrestler
  - Unk, rapper (d. 2025)
- November 29
  - Kimberly Cullum, actress
  - John Milhiser, actor and comedian
- November 30
  - Beau Bokan, singer and frontman for Blessthefall
  - Billy Lush, actor

=== December ===
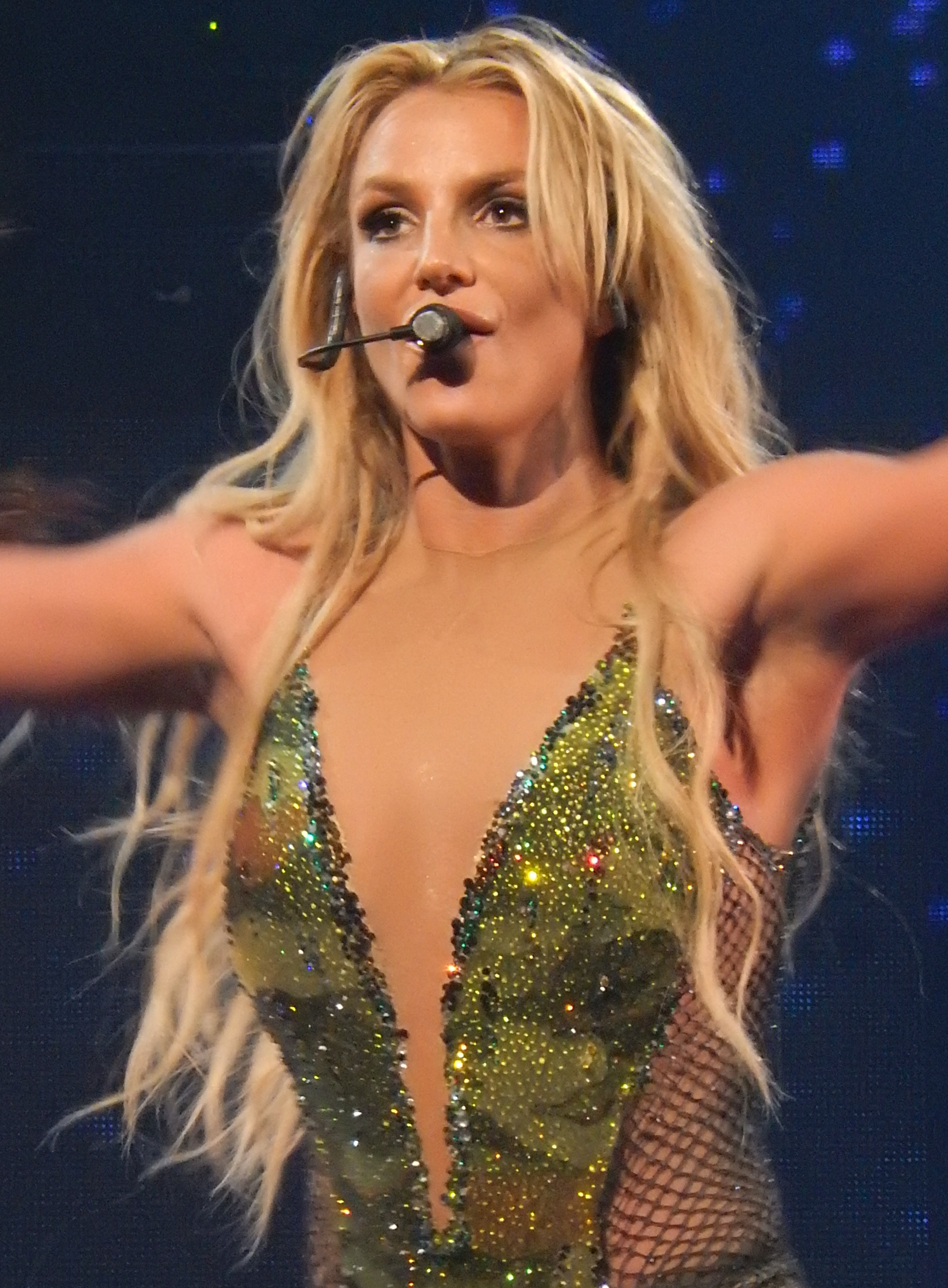
Britney Spears

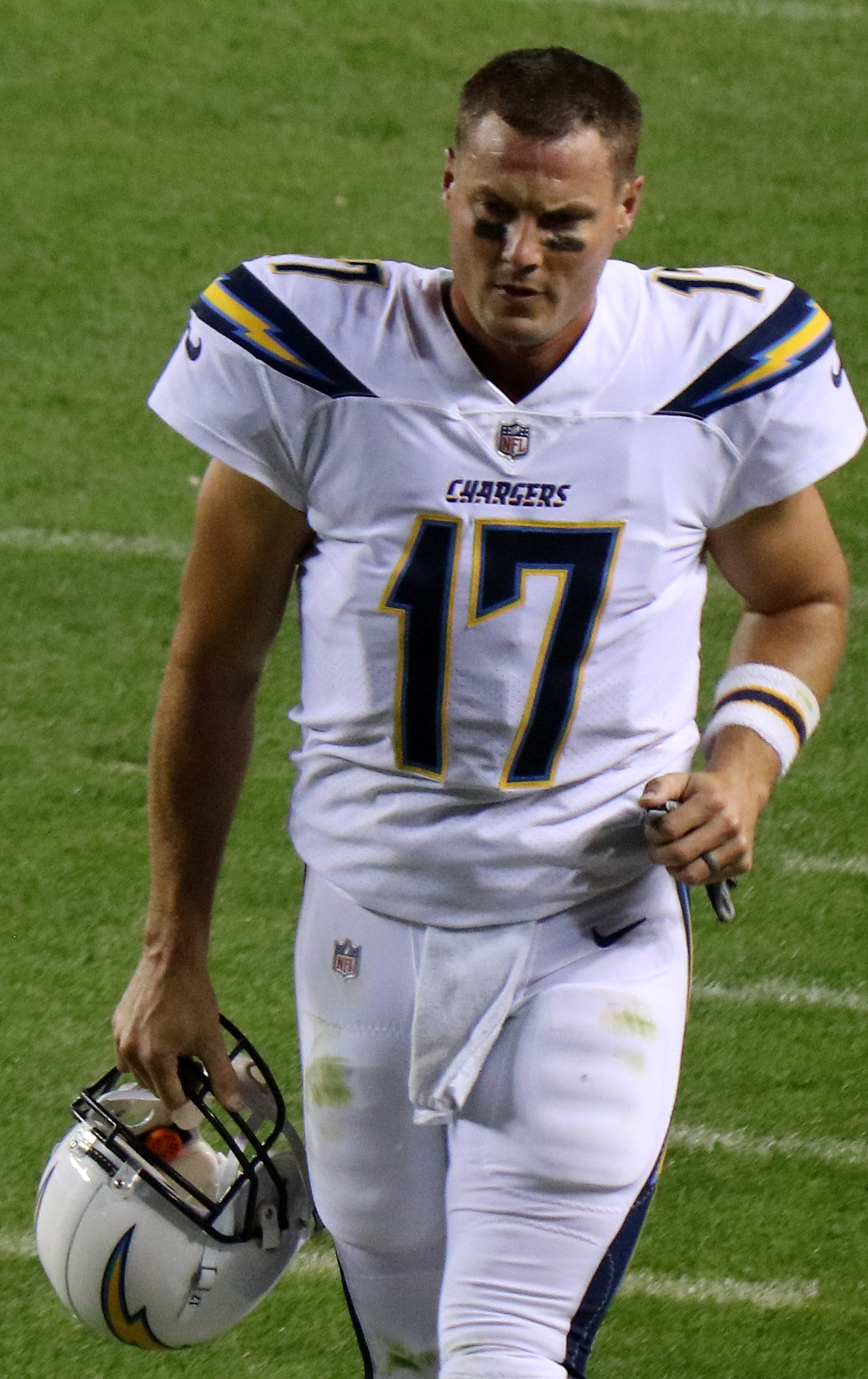
Philip Rivers

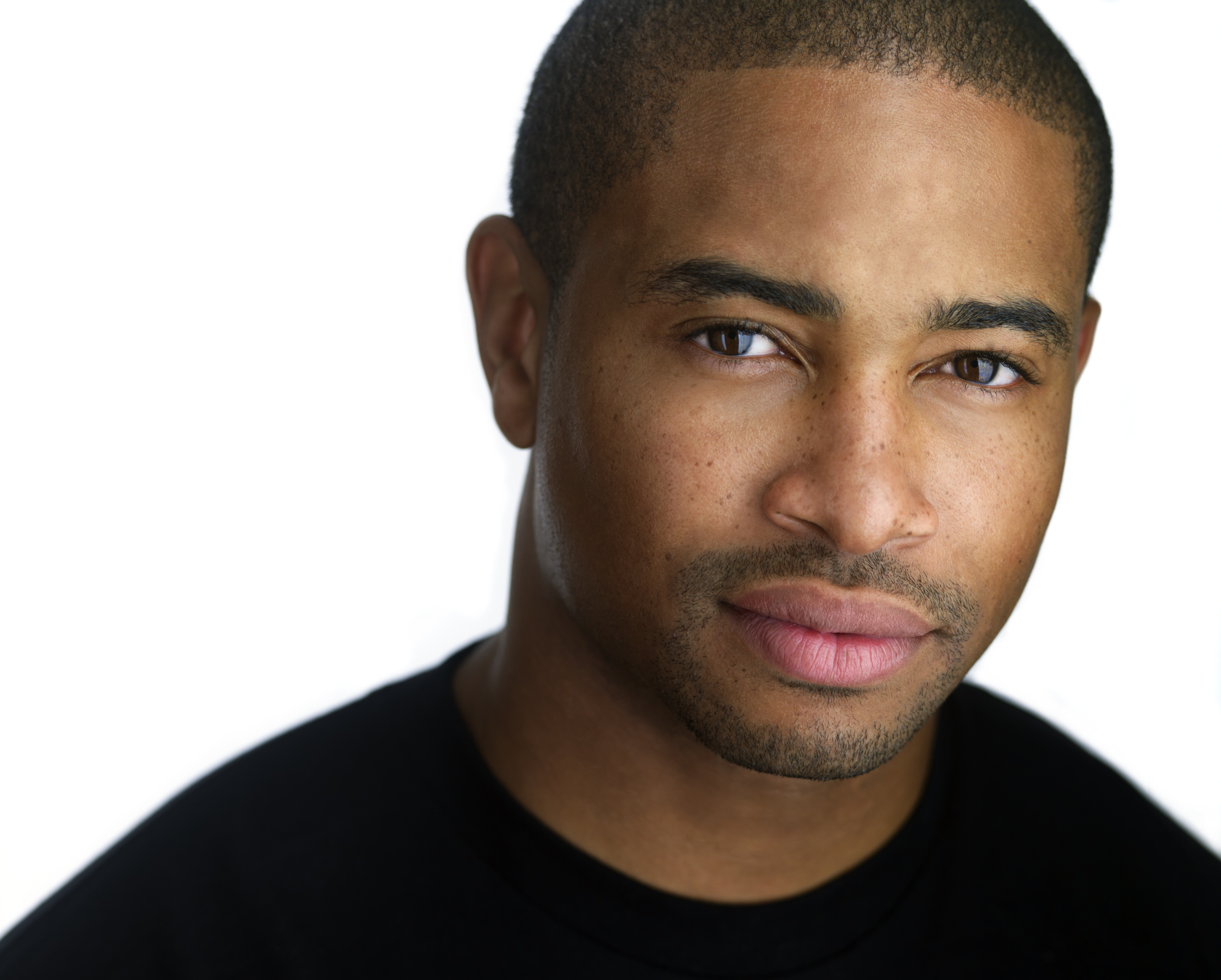
Kevin Phillips

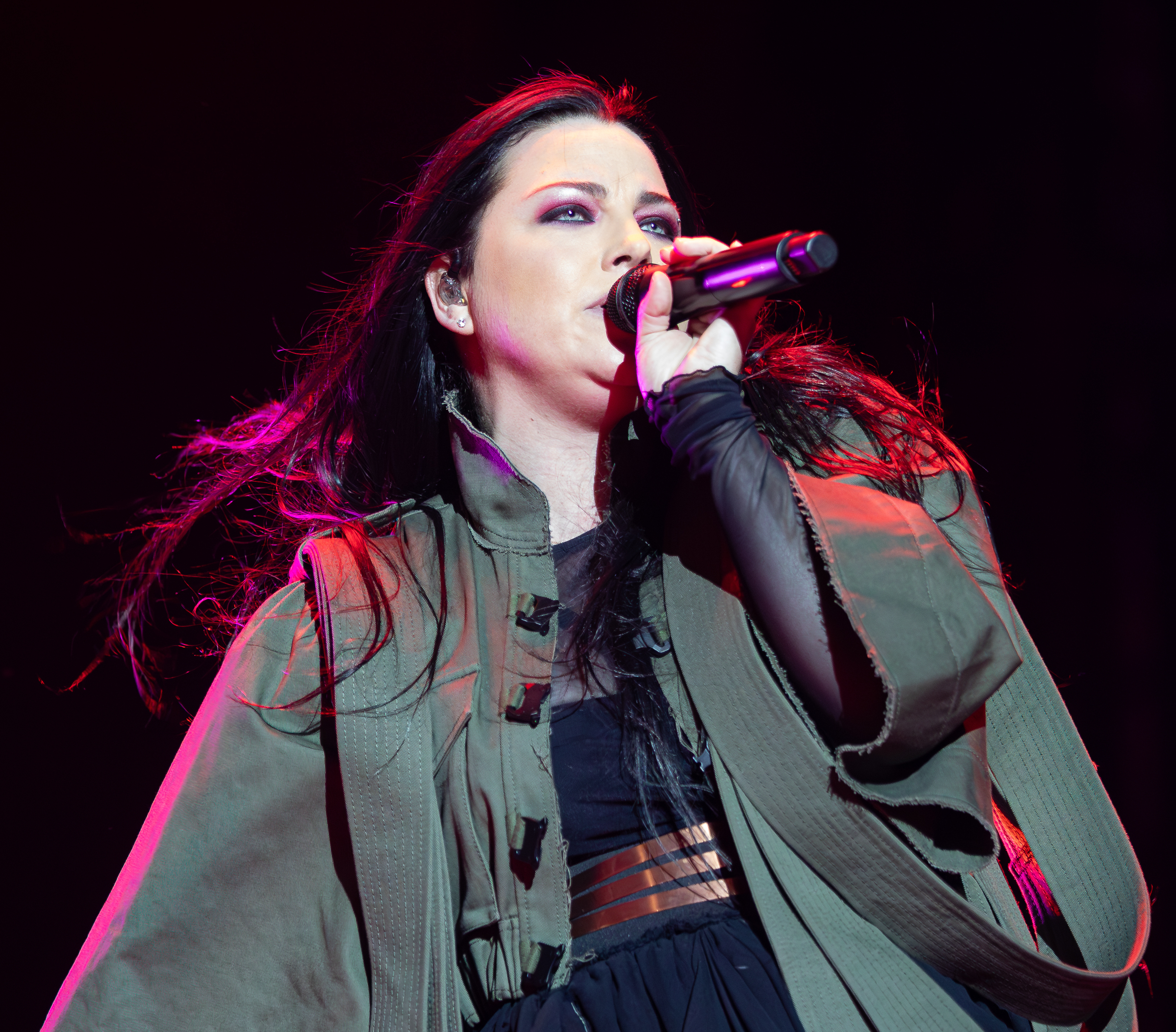
Amy Lee

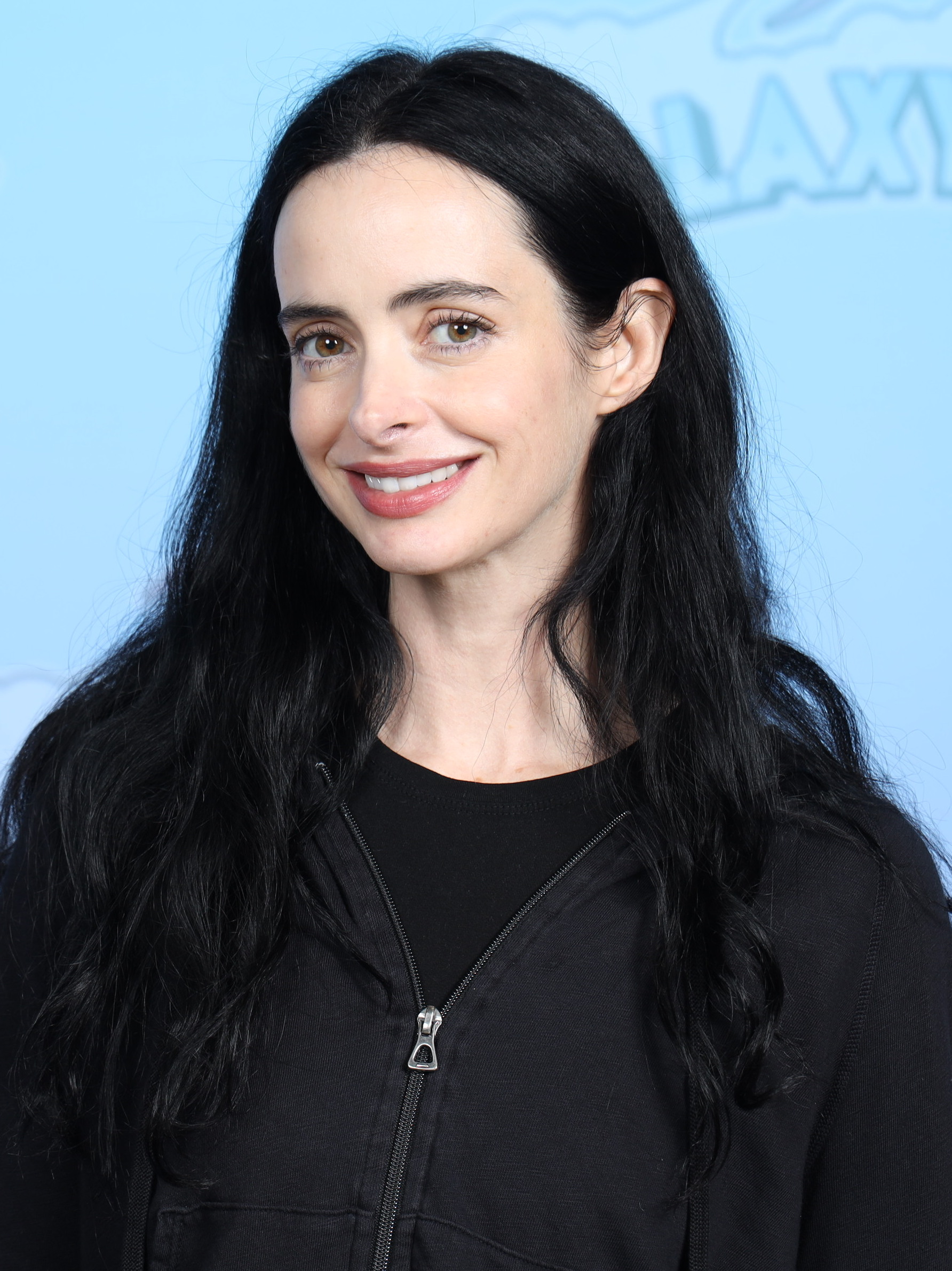
Krysten Ritter

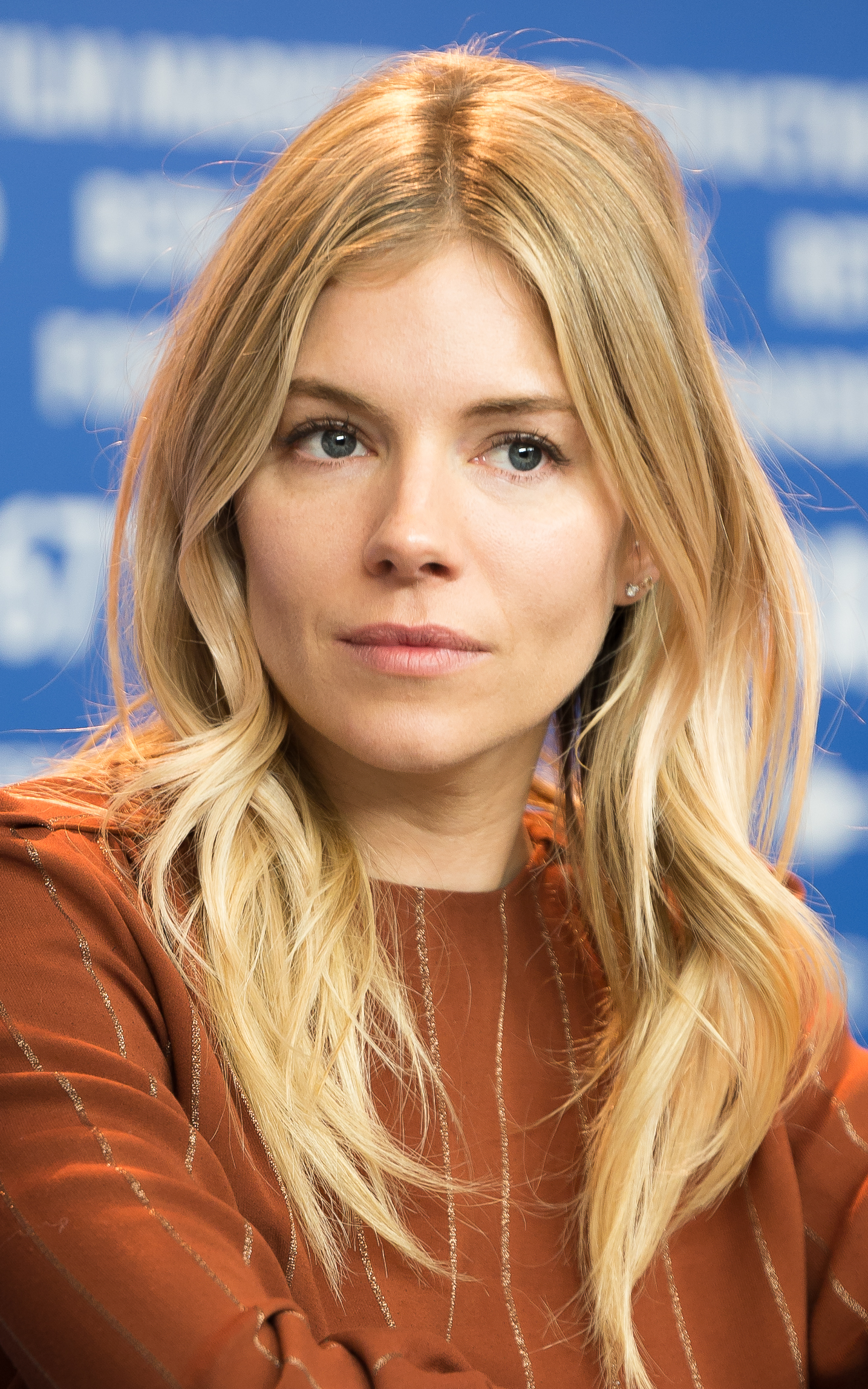
Sienna Miller

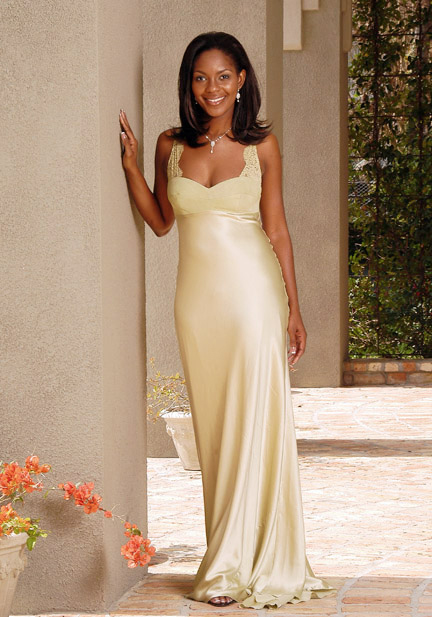
Ericka Dunlap

- December 2 – Britney Spears, singer, dancer, and actress
- December 3
  - Brian Bonsall, actor and musician
  - Liza Lapira, actress
  - Tyjuan Hagler, football player
- December 4 – Lila McCann, singer
- December 6
  - Beth Allen, golfer
  - Jerome Dennis, football player
- December 7
  - Shawn Dailey, bassist, music manager, and producer
  - Matthew Dominick, United States Navy test pilot and NASA astronaut
- December 8
  - Jeremy Accardo, baseball player
  - Charlie Anderson, football player
  - Cory Blaser, MLB umpire
  - Kory Casto, baseball player
  - Philip Rivers, football player
- December 9 – Katie Cook, comic artist and writer
- December 11
  - Rebekkah Brunson, basketball player and coach
  - Jeff McComsey, author and illustrator
  - Kevin Phillips, actor
  - Zacky Vengeance, guitarist for Avenged Sevenfold
- December 12
  - Ronnie Brown, football player
  - C. S. E. Cooney, fantasy literature writer
  - Shane Costa, baseball player
  - Jon Dunn, football player
  - Spencer Johnson, football player
- December 13
  - Astronautalis, hip-hop artist
  - Mathis Bailey, American-born Canadian novelist and fiction writer
  - Lydia Edwards, politician
  - Amy Lee, singer/songwriter and frontperson for Evanescence
- December 15 – Thomas Herrion, football player (died 2005)
- December 16
  - A. J. Allmendinger, race car driver
  - Andy Dugan, actor and filmmaker
  - Krysten Ritter, actress, musician, model and author
- December 17 – Nick Baumgartner, Olympic snowboarder
- December 18
  - Javarus Dudley, football player
  - Joseph Wayne Miller, actor (d. 2018)
- December 19
  - Drake Diener, basketball player
  - Anne Marie Hochhalter, Columbine School Shooting Survivor and activist (d. 2025)
- December 20
  - Patrick Damphier, singer/songwriter, multi-instrumentalist, and record producer
  - Royal Ivey, basketball player
  - James Shields, baseball player
  - Roy Williams, football player
- December 21
  - Frankie Abernathy, purse designer and television personality (d. 2007)
  - Eve Mauro, actress and model
- December 23
  - Jordan Baker, MLB umpire
  - Arik Cannon, wrestler
- December 25 – Tawny Ellis, film producer and daughter of stuntman turned director David R. Ellis
- December 26
  - Drama, dirty south rapper
  - Kevin Lacz, Navy SEAL
- December 27
  - Tank Daniels, football player
  - Jay Ellis, actor
- December 28
  - Elizabeth Jordan Carr, first American test-tube baby
  - Nicholas Duran, politician
  - Jamar Enzor, football player
  - Sienna Miller, American-born English actress
  - Sa-Roc, rapper
- December 29
  - Meena Dimian, broadcaster, writer, actor, and international television personality
  - Ericka Dunlap, beauty pageant winner, Miss America 2003, and Miss America 2004
- December 30
  - Stevie Baggs, football player
  - Kyle Eckel, football player
- December 31
  - Toby Barker, politician
  - Jason Campbell, football player

=== Full date unknown ===
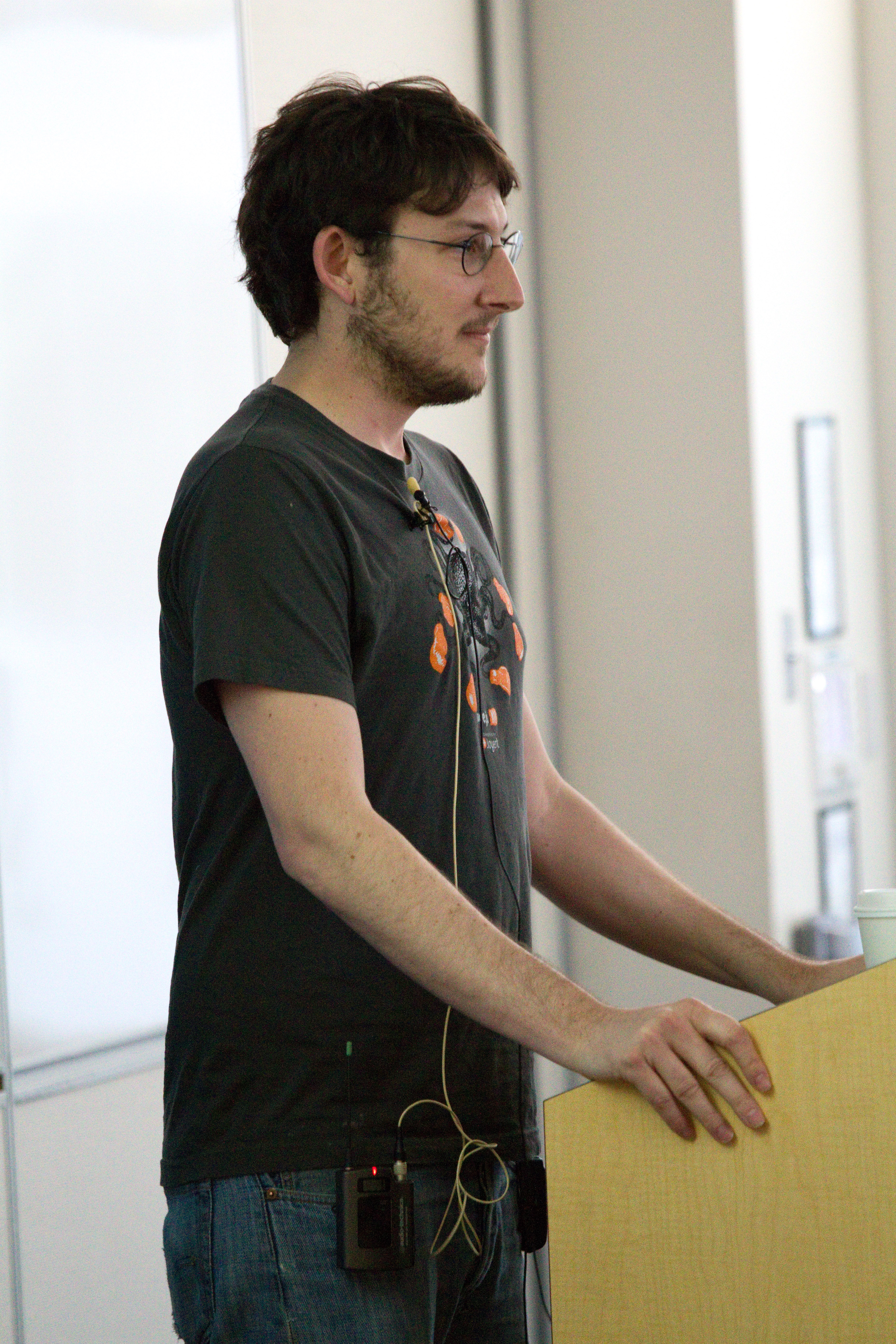
Ryan Dahl

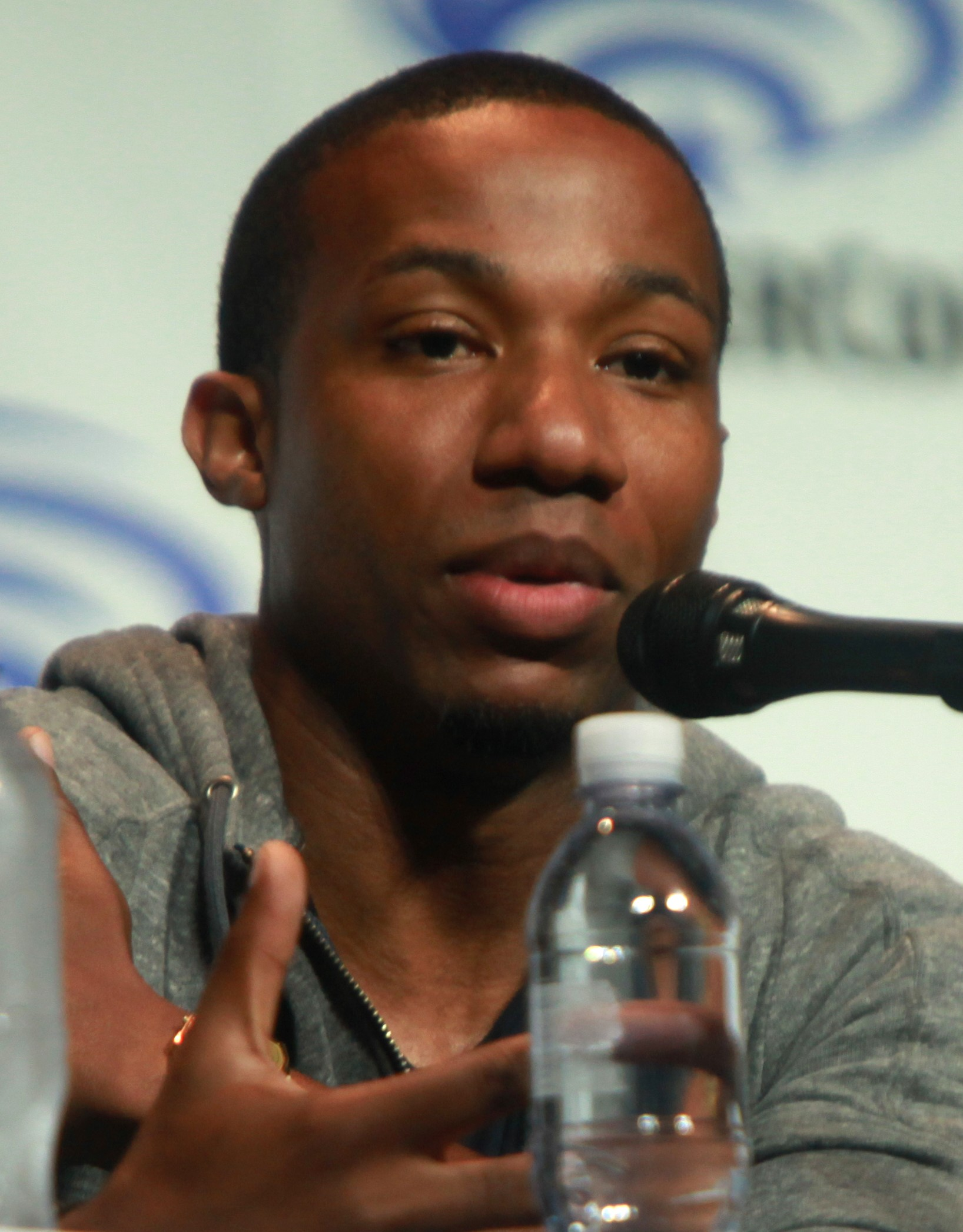
Arlen Escarpeta

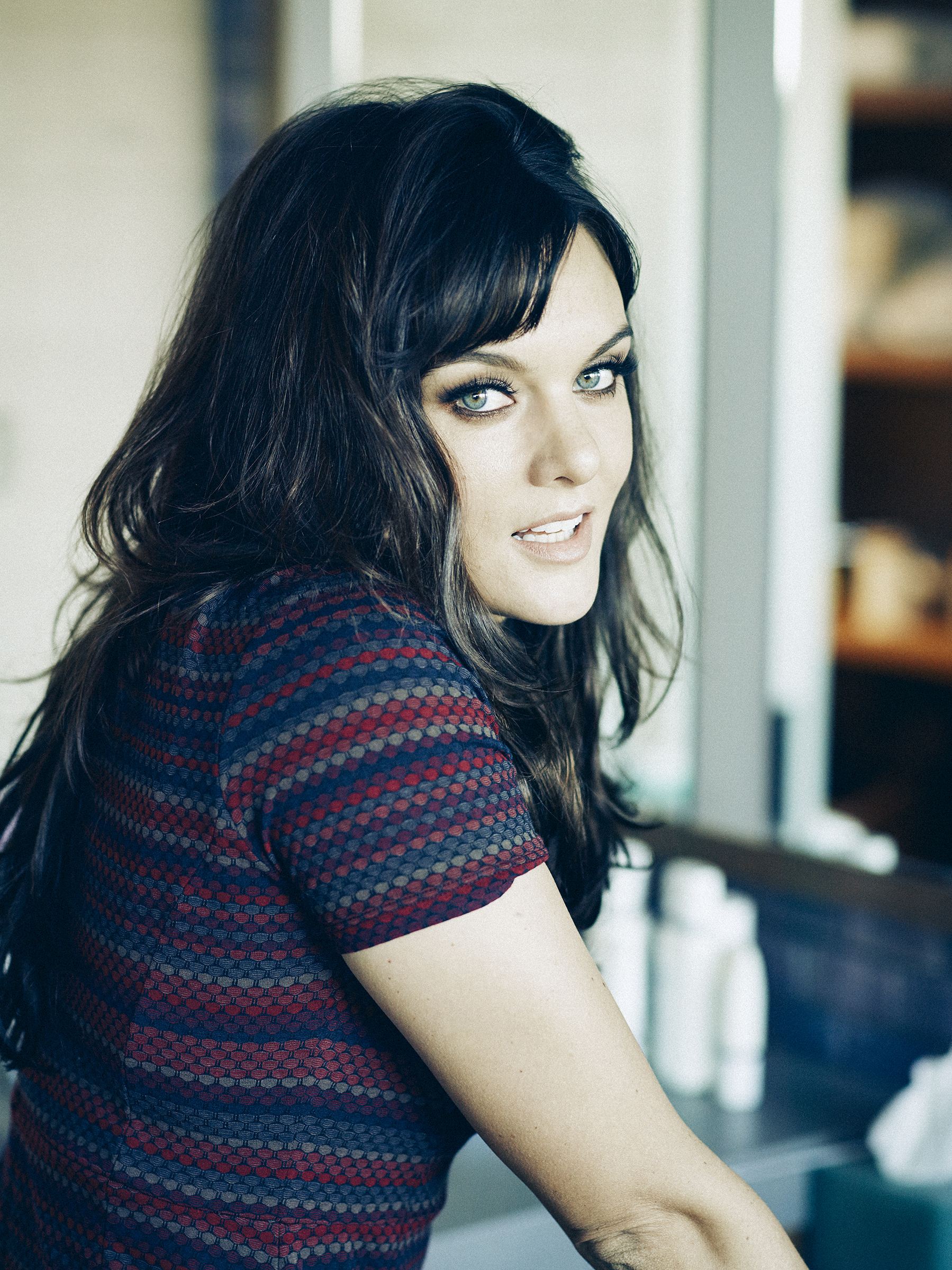
Frankie Shaw

- Josh Abramson, entrepreneur and co-founder of CollegeHumor
- Katrina Andry, visual artist and printmaker
- Antigirl, multidisciplinary artist and graphic designer
- Will Aronson, composer
- Clint Baclawski, photography and installation artist
- Annie Baker, playwright and teacher
- Benjamin Beaton, judge
- Brandon B. Brown, politician
- Katie Brown, rock climber
- Aileen Cannon, judge
- Beau Carey, painter and educator
- Elizabeth Chomko, playwright, film director, screenwriter, and actress
- Zachary Cotler, filmmaker, poet, and novelist
- Nick Courtright, poet
- Amber Cowan, artist and educator
- Ryan Dahl, software engineer, creator of JavaScript as TypeScript
- Angela Davis, chef, food blogger, recipe developer, and cookbook author
- Adriana DeMeo, actress
- Kevin Deutsch, criminal justice journalist and author
- Francesca DiMattio, artist
- Lucy Dodd, painter and installation artist
- Kate Durbin, writer, digital and performance artist
- Brian Elliot, social entrepreneur and speaker on technology, innovation, and social impact
- Arlen Escarpeta, Belizean-born actor
- JB McCuskey, politician
- David McRae, politician
- Emily Young McQueen, wheelchair racer
- Frankie Shaw, actress and filmmaker
- Joshua Caleb Sutter, Neo-Nazi, Satanist, and book publisher
- Weirdo, fine artist (born Jeff Jacobson)

== Deaths ==
- January 5
  - Frederick Osborn, philanthropist and eugenicist (b. 1889)
  - Harold Urey, winner of the Nobel Prize in Chemistry (b. 1893)
- January 7 – John Pascal, playwright, screenwriter, author and journalist (b. 1932)
- January 8 – Matthew Beard, child film actor (b. 1925)
- January 10
  - Katharine Alexander, film actress (b. 1898)
  - Richard Boone, Western film actor (b. 1917)
- January 11 – Beulah Bondi, actress (b. 1888)
- January 13 – Robert Kellard, film actor (b. 1915)
- January 23 – Olin E. Teague, U.S. Representative from Texas (b. 1910)
- January 25 – Adele Astaire, dancer (b. 1896)
- January 29
  - Cozy Cole, jazz drummer (b. 1909)
  - Kipp Hamilton, American actress (b. 1934)
- February 1 – Donald Wills Douglas Sr., industrialist (b. 1892
- February 9
  - Jack Z. Anderson, U.S. Representative from California (b. 1904)
  - Bill Haley, rock & roll musician (b. 1925)
- February 15 – Mike Bloomfield, blues guitarist and composer (b. 1943)
- February 22
  - Michael Maltese, screenwriter (b. 1908)
  - Ilo Wallace, wife of Henry A. Wallace, Second Lady of the United States (born 1888)
- March 5 – Yip Harburg, lyricist (b. 1896)
- March 7 – Bosley Crowther, film critic (b. 1905)
- March 9 – Max Delbrück, biologist, recipient of the Nobel Prize in Physiology or Medicine (b. 1906 in Germany)
- March 30 – DeWitt Wallace, magazine publisher (b. 1889)
- April 4 – Brad Johnson, actor (b. 1924)
- April 5
  - Bob Hite, musician (b. 1943)
  - Lucile Godbold, Olympic athlete (b. 1900)
- April 7 – Norman Taurog, film director (b. 1899)
- April 8 – Omar N. Bradley, U.S. Army General (b. 1893)
- April 12 – Joe Louis, African American heavyweight boxer (b. 1914)
- April 15 – John Thach, naval aviator and admiral (b. 1905)
- April 26
  - Jim Davis, television actor (b. 1909)
  - Madge Evans, actress (b. 1909)
- April 27 – John Aspinwall Roosevelt, businessman and philanthropist (b. 1916)
- April 28 – Cliff Battles, American footballer (Boston Redskins) (b. 1910)
- May 9 – Nelson Algren, novelist (b. 1909)
- May 11 – Bob Marley, reggae musician (b. 1945 in Jamaica)
- May 18
  - Arthur O'Connell, actor (b. 1908)
  - William Saroyan, dramatist and author (b. 1908)
- May 21 – Charles W. Yost, diplomat (b. 1907)
- May 22 – Boris Sagal, director and producer (b. 1923)
- May 23 – George Jessel, actor and entertainer (b. 1898)
- May 28 – Mary Lou Williams, jazz pianist (b. 1910)
- June 1 – Carl Vinson, U.S. Congressman (b. 1883)
- June 12
  - Russell Hayden, actor (b. 1912)
  - Allen Ludden, television game show host (b. 1917)
- June 10 – Jenny Maxwell, actress (b. 1941)
- July 1 – George Voskovec, Czech-American actor (b. 1905)
- July 3 – Ross Martin, actor (b. 1920)
- July 10 – Ken Rex McElroy, murder victim (b. 1934)
- July 16 – Harry Chapin, singer-songwriter, philanthropist, and activist (b. 1942)
- July 27
  - Adam Walsh, murder victim and son of John Walsh (b. 1974)
  - William Wyler, film director (b. 1902)
- July 29 – Robert Moses, urban planner (b. 1888)
- August 1 – Paddy Chayefsky, playwright, screenwriter and novelist (b. 1923)
- August 4 – Melvyn Douglas, actor
- August 15 – Carol Ryrie Brink, author (b. 1895)
- August 30 – Vera-Ellen, actress, singer, and dancer (b. 1921)
- September 3 – Harold Houser, admiral, 35th Governor of American Samoa (b. 1897)
- September 18 – Lyle Goodhue, chemist, inventor and entomologist (b. 1903)
- September 22 – Harry Warren, composer and songwriter (b. 1893)
- September 27 – Robert Montgomery, actor, director, and producer (b. 1904)
- October 5 – Gloria Grahame, actress (b. 1923)
- October 6 – Blanche Noyes, aviator (b. 1900)
- October 24 – Edith Head, costume designer (b. 1897)
- November 2 – Wally Wood, comic book writer, artist, and independent publisher (b. 1927)
- November 3 – H. C. Westermann, sculptor and printmaker (b. 1922)
- November 7 – Will Durant, philosopher and writer (b. 1885)
- November 12 – William Holden, film actor (b. 1918)
- November 15 – William O. Gallery, admiral (b. 1904)
- November 17 – Sibyl M. Rock, mathematician (b. 1909)
- November 21 – Harry von Zell, actor, singer, and announcer (b. 1906)
- November 25 – Jack Albertson, actor (b. 1907)
- November 27 – Lotte Lenya, singer (b. 1898 in Vienna)
- November 29 – Natalie Wood, actress (b. 1938)
- December 2 – Wallace Harrison, architect (b. 1895)
- December 3 – Walter Knott, farmer and founder (b. 1889)
- December 6 – Harry Harlow, psychologist (b. 1905)
- December 13 – Pigmeat Markham, African American vaudevillian (b. 1904)
- December 27 – Hoagy Carmichael, composer and singer (b. 1899)

== See also ==
- 1981 in American television
- List of American films of 1981
- Timeline of United States history (1970–1989)
