= Reception of WikiLeaks =

Sheffield Indymedia spoke at a public meeting in Sheffield on 23 February 2011 about the persecution of WikiLeaks, and in defence of Julian Assange.

WikiLeaks, a whistleblowing website founded by Julian Assange, has received praise as well as criticism from the public, hacktivists, journalist organisations and government officials. The organisation has revealed human rights abuses and was the target of an alleged "cyber war". Allegations have been made that Wikileaks worked with or was exploited by the Russian government and acted in a partisan manner during the 2016 U.S. presidential election.

The organisation has won awards, including The Economist's New Media Award in 2008 at the Index on Censorship Awards and Amnesty International's UK Media Award in 2009. In 2010, the UK Information Commissioner stated that "WikiLeaks is part of the phenomenon of the online, empowered citizen". An Internet petition calling for the cessation of extrajudicial intimidation of WikiLeaks attracted over six hundred thousand signatures. Supporters of WikiLeaks in the media and academia have commended it for exposing state and corporate secrets, increasing transparency, supporting freedom of the press, and enhancing democratic discourse while challenging powerful institutions.

Some U.S. government officials have criticised WikiLeaks for exposing classified information and said that the leaks harm U.S. national security and compromise international diplomacy. The concerns include the publication of sensitive information and the anonymity afforded by the internet. Several human rights organisations requested that WikiLeaks redact the names of civilians working with international forces, in order to protect lives. Some journalists have criticised a perceived lack of editorial discretion when releasing thousands of documents at once and without sufficient analysis.

The United Nations High Commissioner for Human Rights, Navi Pillay, expressed concern about pressure being placed on private companies to enact a financial blockade against WikiLeaks, which Pillay said was a violation of WikiLeaks' right to freedom of expression.

== Background ==
=== Timeline ===
2006: Julian Assange, an Australian programmer and activist, founded WikiLeaks with the intention of publishing leaked documents.

2010: WikiLeaks came to international attention when it published a series of leaks provided by U.S. Army intelligence analyst Chelsea Manning. These leaks included the Baghdad airstrike Collateral Murder video (April 2010), the Afghanistan war logs (July 2010), the Iraq war logs (October 2010), and Cablegate (November 2010). After the 2010 leaks, the United States government launched a criminal investigation into WikiLeaks.

2013: Assange stood for the Australian Senate for the short-lived WikiLeaks Party but failed to win a seat.

2016: During the 2016 U.S. election campaign, WikiLeaks published confidential Democratic Party emails, showing that the party's national committee favoured Hillary Clinton over her rival Bernie Sanders in the primaries.

2017: WikiLeaks publishes the Vault 7 CIA files.

2019: Julian Assange is ejected from the embassy, arrested by the London Metropolitan Police and a US indictment is unsealed.

2024: Julian Assange agreed to a plea deal with U.S. prosecutors and pleaded guilty to an Espionage Act charge of conspiring to obtain and disclose classified U.S. national defence documents in return for a sentence of time served.

== Response from public ==
- Australia: A UMR Research December 2010 poll showed that the majority of Australians are against the official government position on WikiLeaks. The findings which were done on 1,000 individuals show 59% support WikiLeaks' action in making the cables public and 25% oppose it. This was asked a few weeks after the initial release of the cables. According to a 2011 poll by The Lowy Institute, 62% of Australians said the job WikiLeaks does is more of a good thing than a bad thing.
- Germany: According to a telephone survey of 1,004 German residents age 18 and older, which was conducted at the end of November for the German public broadcaster ARD, a majority of 53% disapprove of WikiLeaks, while 43% are generally in favour of the platform. Asked about the specific release of US diplomatic cables, almost two-Thirds (65%) believe that these documents should not be published, compared to 31% that agree with them being released to the public.
- Pakistan: A December 2010 a Gallup poll found that 52% of Pakistanis believe that "America herself has published the documents on purpose to create unrest," while 24% believe that this is not the case and 24% did not respond.
- United Kingdom: A CNN poll of 2,010 British adults conducted in December 2010 revealed that more people agree than disagree that WikiLeaks was right to release the cables, by 42% to 33%. The remaining 25% did not have a position. Older people were significantly more likely to oppose WikiLeaks.
- United States: A poll conducted by the Pew Research Center found that 42% of Americans thought that the release of the Afghan war logs serves the public interest, with 47% of Americans saying it harmed the public interest. 37% of the public said they had heard a lot about the release. Amongst these, 53% say the disclosure of classified documents about the Afghanistan war harms the public interest. According to a telephone survey of 1,029 US residents age 18 and older, conducted by the Marist Institute for Public Opinion in December 2010, 70% of American respondents – particularly Republicans and older people – think the leaks are doing more harm than good by allowing enemies of the United States government to see confidential and secret information about U.S. foreign policy. Approximately 22% – especially young liberals – think the leaks are doing more good than harm by making the U.S. government more transparent and accountable. A majority of 59% also want to see the people behind WikiLeaks prosecuted, while 31% said the publication of secrets is protected under the First Amendment guarantee of a free press. According to a CBS poll conducted the same month, 60% of Americans thought WikiLeaks' releases would have a damaging impact on US relations overseas. 74% of Republicans, 52% of Democrats and 59% of Independents thought the Cablegate release would have a damaging impact on the US. Another CBS poll conducted the next month found that only 9% of Americans viewed Wikileaks positively, and 45% viewed it negatively with 22% of them thinking it was treasonous and 23% thinking it was damaging but legal. Republicans were more than twice as likely to think WikiLeaks was treasonous than Democrats. An Economist-YouGov poll tracked partisan sentiment about WikiLeaks from 2013 to 2016 and found that Republicans' view of WikiLeaks improved by 74 points after the DNC and Podesta leaks, and Democrats view of WikiLeaks became more negative by just 25 points over the same period. According to a 2015 poll by Fox News, three times as many voters disapprove of WikiLeaks as support it. 73% of Republicans, 57% of Democrats and 76% of Independents disapproved of the organisation, and 61% of voters thought that releasing classified military files was treason.

== Response from governments ==
=== Australia ===
On 16 March 2009, the Australian Communications and Media Authority added WikiLeaks to their proposed list of sites that will be blocked for all Australians if the mandatory internet filtering scheme is implemented as planned. The blacklisting had been removed by 29 November 2010.

On 2 December 2010, Prime Minister Julia Gillard made a statement that she 'absolutely condemns' WikiLeaks' actions and that the release of information on the site was 'grossly irresponsible' and 'illegal.' However, on 8 December 2010 – after WikiLeaks published U.S. diplomatic cables in which United States diplomats labelled him a "control freak", former Australian Prime Minister and Foreign Minister (now resigned) Kevin Rudd said the leak of the US secret cables raised questions about US security. Rudd said, "The core responsibility, and therefore legal liability, goes to those individuals responsible for that initial unauthorised release."

=== Brazil ===
President Luiz Inácio Lula da Silva stated in reference to WikiLeaks disclosure of classified US diplomatic cables in November and December 2010 that WikiLeaks had "exposed a diplomacy that had appeared unreachable".

=== China ===
According to the WikiLeaks website, the government of the People's Republic of China has attempted to block all traffic to websites with "wikileaks" in the URL since 2007, but that this can be bypassed by encrypted connections or by using one of WikiLeaks' many covert URLs.

=== France ===
The French Industry Minister Éric Besson said in a letter to the CGIET technology agency, WikiLeaks "violates the secret of diplomatic relations and puts people protected by diplomatic secret in danger". Therefore, it would be 'unacceptable' that the site was hosted on servers based in France. The minister asked for measures to bar WikiLeaks from France.

=== Germany ===
The home of Theodor Reppe, registrant of the German WikiLeaks domain name, wikileaks.de, was raided on 24 March 2009 after WikiLeaks released the Australian Communications and Media Authority (ACMA) censorship blacklist. The site was not affected.

=== Iceland ===
After the release of the 2007 Baghdad airstrikes video and as they prepared to release film of the Granai airstrike, Julian Assange has said that his group of volunteers came under intense surveillance. In an interview and Twitter posts he said that a restaurant in Reykjavík where his group of volunteers met came under surveillance in March; that there was "covert following and hidden photography" by police and foreign intelligence services; that an apparent British intelligence agent made thinly veiled threats in a Luxembourg car park; and that one of the volunteers was detained by police for 21 hours. Another volunteer posted that computers were seized, saying "If anything happens to us, you know why... and you know who is responsible." According to the Columbia Journalism Review, "the Icelandic press took a look at Assange's charges of being surveilled in Iceland [...] and, at best, have found nothing to substantiate them."

In August 2009, Kaupthing Bank secured a court order preventing Iceland's national broadcaster, RÚV, from broadcasting a risk analysis report showing the bank's substantial exposure to debt default risk. This information had been leaked to WikiLeaks and remained available on the WikiLeaks website; faced with an injunction minutes before broadcast, the channel aired a screen-shot of the WikiLeaks site instead of the scheduled piece on the bank. Citizens of Iceland were reported to be outraged that RÚV was prevented from broadcasting news of relevance. Therefore, WikiLeaks has been credited with inspiring the Icelandic Modern Media Initiative, a bill meant to reclaim Iceland's 2007 Reporters Without Borders (Reporters sans frontières) ranking as first in the world for free speech. It aims to enact a range of protections for sources, journalists, and publishers. Birgitta Jónsdóttir, a former WikiLeaks volunteer and member of the Icelandic parliament, is the chief sponsor of the proposal.

=== India ===
In identical statements to both Houses of Parliament on 18 March 2011, then Prime Minister Manmohan Singh rejected all allegations against his government revealed by the United States diplomatic cables leak, including allegations of bribery during the 2008 Lok Sabha vote of confidence. Singh told Parliament, "The Government of India cannot confirm the veracity, contents or even the existence of such communications. I may point out that many of the persons referred to in those reports have stoutly denied the veracity of the contents. An issue was raised that the offence of bribery was committed in India. Government rejects that allegation absolutely and firmly."

In an interview with Times Now, Julian Assange labelled the Indian government's response as "one of the worst in the world" and a "clear attempt to mislead the nation on what the cables were". Assange stated, "The response by the government left a lot to be desired. Before it was clear to me that Prime Minister Mr. Singh was deliberately attempting to mislead the Indian people on what type of material this was. People tell me that he is not personally corrupt, I do not know myself as I don't have information on that. But, his reaction left a lot to be desired. It wasn't to fully and frankly investigate what was going on and then provide finding to the parliament. Rather, it was attempt to spin the issue and I suspect that has come from experience in dealing with similar scandals in the past."

=== Iran ===
The Former President of Iran, Mahmoud Ahmadinejad, also criticised WikiLeaks following the release of United States diplomatic cables. Ahmadinejad claimed that the release of cables purporting to show concern with Iran by Arab states was a planned leak by the United States to discredit his government, though he did not indicate whether he believed WikiLeaks was in collusion with the United States or was simply an unwitting facilitator.

=== Libya ===
Muammar Gaddafi blamed WikiLeaks for the Tunisian revolution "[Do not be fooled by] WikiLeaks which publishes information written by lying ambassadors in order to create chaos."

=== Philippines ===
President Benigno Aquino III condemned WikiLeaks and leaked documents related to the country, saying that it can lead to massive cases of miscommunication.

=== Thailand ===
The Centre for the Resolution of the Emergency Situation (CRES) is currently censoring the WikiLeaks website in Thailand and more than 40,000 other websites because of the emergency decree declared in Thailand at the beginning of April 2010 as a result of political instabilities.

=== Turkey ===
The Turkish government blocked access to Wikileaks on 20 July 2016 after it released nearly 300,000 emails involving the ruling Justice and Development Party. The email releases were in response to the 2016 Turkish coup d'état attempt.

=== United Nations ===
In December 2010, the UN High Commissioner for Human Rights expressed her concern over the pressure that had been placed on banks, credit card companies and internet service providers to stop hosting WikiLeaks and close down its donation lines of credit.

=== United States ===
As of 2010, access to WikiLeaks was blocked in the United States Library of Congress and U.S. federal government staff were blocked from viewing the site. On 3 December 2010 the White House Office of Management and Budget sent a memorandum forbidding all unauthorised federal government employees and contractors from accessing classified documents publicly available on WikiLeaks and other websites. The U.S. Army, the Federal Bureau of Investigation, and the Justice Department were considering criminally prosecuting WikiLeaks and Assange "on grounds they encouraged the theft of government property", although former prosecutors said doing so would be difficult. According to a Daily Beast report, the Obama administration asked the UK, Germany, and Australia among others to also consider bringing criminal charges against Assange for the Afghan war leaks and to help limit Assange's travels across international borders. Columbia University students were warned by their Office of Career Services that the U.S. State Department had contacted the office in an email saying that the diplomatic cables which were released by WikiLeaks were "still considered classified" and that "online discourse about the documents 'would call into question your ability to deal with confidential information'".

Although U.S. Secretary of State Hillary Clinton initially refused to comment on specific reports, she said that the leaks "put people's lives in danger" and "threatens national security". Former United States Secretary of Defense Robert Gates commented, "Is this embarrassing? Yes. Is it awkward? Yes. Consequences for U.S. foreign policy? I think fairly modest." Following the November 2010 release of United States diplomatic cables, Hillary Clinton denounced the group, saying, "this disclosure is not just an attack on America's foreign policy interests, it is an attack on the international community." Peter King, chairman of the Homeland Security Committee of the United States House of Representatives stated his support of Clinton's position for listing WikiLeaks as a "foreign terrorist organisation" explaining that "WikiLeaks presents a clear and present danger to the national security of the United States." In a contrary statement, secretary of Defense Robert Gates has said that concerns about the disclosures were "over-wrought" in terms of their likely adverse impact on ordinary diplomatic activities. Philip J. Crowley, United States Assistant Secretary of State for Public Affairs, stated on 2 December 2010 that the US State Department did not regard WikiLeaks as a media organisation. "WikiLeaks is not a media organisation. That is our view."

US Senator Joe Lieberman called on Amazon.com to shut down a WikiLeaks web-site, praised the company for doing so, and called for other companies to follow suit. He also proposed new legislation targeting similar cases – Securing Human Intelligence and Enforcing Lawful Dissemination Act (SHIELD Act). Lieberman later said that also The New York Times and other news organisations publishing the US embassy cables being released by WikiLeaks could be investigated for breaking US espionage laws. After these statements the US Ambassador to Australia assured the Australian government and people that "The concerns we have do not centre on Julian Assange and they never should have"

==== Surveillance of Assange by U.S. intelligence in the Ecuadorian embassy ====
On 10 April 2019, WikiLeaks said it had uncovered an extensive surveillance operation against Assange from within the embassy. WikiLeaks said that "material including video, audio, copies of private legal documents and a medical report" had surfaced in Spain and that unnamed individuals in Madrid had made an extortion attempt.

On 26 September 2019, the Spanish newspaper El País reported that the Spanish defence and security company Undercover Global S.L. (UC Global) had spied on Assange for the CIA during his time in the embassy. UC Global had been contracted to protect the embassy during this time. According to the report UC Global's owner David Morales had provided the CIA with audio and video of meetings Assange held with his lawyers and colleagues. El País reported that Morales also arranged for the US to have direct access to the stream from video cameras installed in the embassy at the beginning of December 2017. The evidence was part of a secret investigation by Spain's High Court, the Audiencia Nacional, into Morales and his relationship with US intelligence. The investigation was precipitated by a complaint by Assange that accused UC Global of violating his privacy and client-attorney privileges as well as committing misappropriation, bribery and money laundering. Morales was arrested in September on charges involving violations of privacy and client-attorney privileges, as well as misappropriation, bribery, money laundering and criminal possession of weapons. He was released on bail.

In a November 2019 article, Italian journalist Stefania Maurizi said she had access to some of the videos, audios and photos showing a medical examination of Assange, a meeting between Ecuadorian ambassador Carlos Abad Ortiz and his staff, a meeting between Assange, Glenn Greenwald and David Miranda and lunch between Assange and British rapper M.I.A. According to Maurizi, microphones had been placed in the women's toilets to capture meetings between Assange and his lawyers and phones belonging to some of the embassy's visitors were compromised. Spanish lawyer Aitor Martinez, who is part of Assange's legal team, said videos were taken of meetings between Assange and his legal defence team. Maurizi wrote that, based on statements from former employees of UC Global, internal UC Global emails and the type of information collected, she believed the surveillance was conducted on behalf of the US government and could be used in support of the extradition case.

In August 2022, four of Assange's American lawyers and journalists filed a lawsuit against the CIA, Mike Pompeo, UC Global and Morales over the surveillance.

==== Discussions about extreme measures ====
U.S. Secretary of State and CIA Director Mike Pompeo has held mixed views on WikiLeaks, citing leaked e-mails from Hillary Clinton, campaign chair John Podesta, and former Democratic National Committee chairperson Debbie Wasserman Schultz and using his Twitter as a platform to call attention to the "newly released emails of Hillary Clinton and her cronies," before a FOX appearance on the same topic. Wikileaks released Vault 7 in March 2017 and, in April, Pompeo called WikiLeaks "a non-state hostile intelligence service often abetted by state actors like Russia". Assange responded "For the head of the CIA to pronounce what the boundaries are, of reporting or not reporting — is a very disturbing precedent. The head of the CIA determining who is a publisher, who's not a publisher, who's a journalist, who's not a journalist, is totally out of line". According to former intelligence officials, in the wake of the Vault 7 leaks, the CIA talked about kidnapping Assange from Ecuador's London embassy, and some senior officials discussed his potential assassination. Yahoo! News found "no indication that the most extreme measures targeting Assange were ever approved." Some of its sources stated that they had alerted House and Senate intelligence committees to the plans that Pompeo and others was suggesting.

In April 2017, AG Jeff Sessions stated that arresting Julian Assange was a priority: "We have professionals that have been in the security business of the United States for many years that are shocked by the number of leaks and some of them are quite serious. So yes, it is a priority. We've already begun to step up our efforts and whenever a case can be made, we will seek to put some people in jail."

In October 2021, Assange's lawyers introduced the alleged plot during a hearing of the High Court of Justice in London as it considered the U.S. appeal of a lower court's ruling that Assange could not be extradited to face charges in the U.S. In 2022 the Spanish courts summoned Pompeo as a witness to testify on the alleged plans.

=== Venezuela ===
Hugo Chávez, former president of Venezuela, stated his support for WikiLeaks following the release of US diplomatic cables in November 2010 that showed the United States had tried to rally support from regional governments to isolate Venezuela. "I have to congratulate the people of WikiLeaks for their bravery and courage," Chávez commented in televised remarks.

== Response from media ==
Authors Michela Wrong criticised WikiLeaks for pirating her book It's Our Turn To Eat in its entirety on the grounds that Nairobi booksellers would not sell it because they were afraid of being sued under Kenya's libel laws. She said "I was beside myself because I thought my entire African market is vanishing. I wrote to WikiLeaks and said, please, you're going to damage your own cause because if people like me can't make any money from royalties then publishers are not going to commission people writing about corruption in Africa". WikiLeaks responded "This book may have been your baby, but it is now Kenya's son". Michela Wrong said "On the whole I approve of WikiLeaks but these guys are infuriatingly self-righteous".

Writing for The Guardian in 2010, Nick Davies said there were low-level attempts to smear WikiLeaks, including online accusations against Assange. In 2010, Wikileaks published a US military document containing a plan to "destroy the center of gravity" of Wikileaks by attacking its trustworthiness. It suggests the identification and exposure of WikiLeaks' sources to "deter others from using WikiLeaks". According to Columbia Journalism Review, reactions to the document were "overwrought" and "the spin" by WikiLeaks "was "a step too far".

In January 2011, Glen Newey wrote in the London Review of Books that the cumulative effect of WikiLeaks releases "is a bit like watching a lava lamp. Decontextualised globules of data surge from below, loom briefly large, detach themselves and subside as others take their place in a mesmeric flux".

In 2013, Heather Brooke argued that because of WikiLeaks "governments across the world have been frightened into ever greater internet surveillance".

In 2018, The Atlantic suggested that WikiLeaks had changed since publishing Collateral Murder. Clint Hendler, a senior editor at Mother Jones who reported extensively on WikiLeaks for Columbia Journalism Review said that the organisation "used to seem a lot simpler".

=== Response to publications ===
==== United States documents leak of the War in Afghanistan ====
===== Los Angeles Times =====
An editorial in the Los Angeles Times stated that comparisons to the Pentagon Papers was an exaggeration as the documents lacked the policy implications of the papers, but that "no democracy can or should fight a war without the consent of its people, and that consent is only meaningful if it is predicated on real information". The Los Angeles Times did seem to indicate the documents have parallels with the Pentagon Papers in being published during a subsequent administration "the documents offer insight primarily into the war-fighting of the recently departed George W. Bush administration; the Pentagon Papers ended with the Johnson administration and were not published until Richard Nixon was president."

===== The Washington Post =====
An editorial in The Washington Post stated "they hardly provide a secret history of the war or disclose previously unknown malfeasance" and that "tends to fill out and confirm the narrative of Afghanistan between 2004 and 2009 that most Americans are already familiar with". The Post commented that it hardly merited the media hype and was not comparable to the Pentagon Papers or the MfS files. The editorial argued that WikiLeaks' founder revealed his organization's antiwar agenda by making the claim it contained evidence for prosecuting war crimes.

===== Foreign Policy =====
Blake Hounshell wrote in his blog on Foreign Policy that, after reading "selected documents", he believed that there is less new information in the documents than The New York Times, The Guardian, and Der Spiegel were reporting. Hounshell indicated how careful both The Guardian and The New York Times were to note "the raw reports in the Wikileaks archive often seem poorly sourced and present implausible information". Commenting on the significance of the documents:

I'd say that so far the documents confirm what we already know about the war: It's going badly; Pakistan is not the world's greatest ally and is probably playing a double game; coalition forces have been responsible for far too many civilian casualties; and the United States doesn't have very reliable intelligence in Afghanistan.

===== Other organisations =====
The release resulted in some criticism by some media organisations, and questions about WikiLeaks' tactics. Mother Jones wrote that "there's not much there" and "most of this information is tactical nuts and bolts, devoid of context, and largely useless". The Columbia Journalism Review was very critical and wrote "there will be serious, and deadly, consequences from WikiLeaks's War Diary archive".

===== News organisations given advanced access to the documents =====
====== The New York Times ======
The New York Times described the war logs as "a six-year archive of classified military documents [that] offers an unvarnished and grim picture of the Afghan war".

On the decision to publish, they stated:

Deciding whether to publish secret information is always difficult, and after weighing the risks and public interest, we sometimes chose not to publish. But there are times when the information is of significant public interest, and this is one of those times. The documents illuminate the extraordinary difficulty of what the United States and its allies have undertaken in a way that other accounts have not. Most of the incident reports are marked "secret", a relatively low level of classification. The Times has taken care not to publish information that would harm national security interests. The Times and the other news organizations agreed at the outset that we would not disclose – either in our articles or any of our online supplementary material – anything that was likely to put lives at risk or jeopardize military or antiterrorist operations. We have, for example, withheld any names of operatives in the field and informants cited in the reports.

====== The Guardian ======
The Guardian called the material "one of the biggest leaks in U.S. military history...a devastating portrait of the failing war in Afghanistan, revealing how coalition forces have killed hundreds of civilians in unreported incidents, Taliban attacks have soared and NATO commanders fear neighbouring Pakistan and Iran are fuelling the insurgency".

The Guardian also reported that Daniel Ellsberg has described the disclosure as on the scale of his leaking of the Pentagon Papers in 1971 revealing how the U.S. public was misled about the Vietnam War.

====== Der Spiegel ======
Der Spiegel wrote that "the editors in chief of Spiegel, The New York Times and The Guardian were 'unanimous in their belief that there is a justified public interest in the material'".

==== Iraq War documents leak ====
Upon the lifting of the embargo, the media coverage by these groups was followed by further coverage by other media organisations. The Guardian said that "the New York Times, Washington Post and other papers were accused by web publications and some bloggers of downplaying the extent to which the documents revealed US complicity in torture and provided evidence that politicians in Washington "lied" about the failures of the US military mission". Glenn Greenwald of Salon.com commented that "media outlets around the world prominently highlighted this revelation, but not The New York Times", calling their coverage of the document leak "subservient" to the Pentagon. UK papers including The Independent and The Daily Telegraph called the War Logs an indictment of the war that "must be investigated not ignored for the sake of political expediency".

Slate wrote the "bigger finding" was that "most Iraqi civilian deaths were caused by other Iraqis" and that "while some American guards behaved horrendously toward Iraqi detainees at the Abu Ghraib prison, Iraqi police and soldiers have behaved much worse". Other writers said the War Logs highlighted the danger of Iran in Iraq and "may well derail the formation of a government by implicating caretaker prime minister Nuri al-Maliki in running death squads". Max Boot wrote that the documents "don't tell us much that we didn't already know in broad outline".

==== United States diplomatic cables leak ====
A 29 November 2010 article in The Economist defended the leaks stating that "if secrecy is necessary for national security and effective diplomacy, it is also inevitable that the prerogative of secrecy will be used to hide the misdeeds of the permanent state and its privileged agents". In an open letter to prime minister Julia Gillard, some of Australia's main media personnel said the U.S. and Australian governments' reaction to the release of diplomatic correspondence by the WikiLeaks website is "deeply troubling" and warned that they will "strongly resist any attempts to make the publication of these or similar documents illegal".

A 30 November 2010 Ottawa Sun editorial criticised the leak: "we see no for-the-good-of-the-people journalistic justification for WikiLeaks reckless sabotage of U.S. international relations".

Javier Moreno, editor-in-chief of El País, said that the release of the documents does not put lives at risk and that the attacks on such a release of information to the general public amount to the same reaction seen in other leaks, such as the Pentagon Papers in 1971. Moreno said that the only thing at risk is the career of officials and diplomats within the compromised governments. Henry Porter, writing in The Observer, established a parallel with events in 1771. At that time British law prohibited reporting of Parliamentary debates and speeches because those in power argued that the information was too sensitive and would be disruptive if published. John Wilkes and others illegally published debates, with the eventual support of the London mob, shopkeepers and members of the gentry. Porter says that "From that moment, the freedom of the press was born ... and the kingdom did not fall."

On 30 November 2010, Kathleen Troia "KT" McFarland, a national security analyst and host for Fox News, called Assange a terrorist, Wikileaks "a terrorist organization" and has called for Chelsea Manning's execution if she is found guilty of making the leaks. A 2 December 2010 editorial by Jeffrey T. Kuhner in The Washington Times said Assange should be treated "the same way as other high-value terrorist targets" and be assassinated.

The Sydney Morning Herald ran an 8 December 2010 editorial by Bryce Lowry describing Assange as "the Ned Kelly of the digital age" comparing him to a bushranger who defied colonial authorities in Australia in the nineteenth century. On 10 December 2010, Beijing Daily, a publication of the Beijing, China, city government, suggested in an editorial that this year's Nobel Peace Prize not be given to the imprisoned Chinese dissident Liu Xiaobo but to Assange.

Richard Stengel, managing editor of Time, defended the leaks, on 13 December 2010, arguing that although the release of classified materials harms American security, he noted the right of news organizations to publish those documents under the First Amendment. In that same edition of Time, Fareed Zakaria argued that cables leak show the competency, not duplicity, of American diplomacy as it shows "Washington pursuing privately pretty much the policies it has articulated publicly." Others argued the cables were "humdrum diplomatic pillow talk" but The Guardian argued there was "hunger for the cables in countries that didn't have fully functioning democracies".

Some media outlets have criticized the subsequent attacks on WikiLeaks after the cables leak. "Not much truck with freedom of information, then, in the land of the free", Seumas Milne, a left-wing associate editor of The Guardian. Financial Times Deutschland said that "the already damaged reputation of the United States will only be further tattered with Assange's new martyr status".

==== Guantanamo Bay files leak ====
The contrast between foreign and United States media was noted by several journalists, including Glenn Greenwald who described the differences as "stark, predictable and revealing". He wrote that "foreign newspapers highlight how these documents show U.S. actions to be so oppressive and unjust, while American newspapers downplayed that fact."

==== Syria files ====
One of the partners chosen by Wikileaks to assist with the publication of the Syria files was the Lebanese newspaper Al Akhbar. The choice received some criticism because Al Akhbar had been accused of bias towards Syrian President Bashar al-Assad. Others said the choice would act as a balance against coverage by Western media outlets that were expected to play up Syrian crimes. Some reporters saw the Syria Files as taking a more neutral approach, without the ideology or politics associated with previous releases, but Sarah Harrison rejected the suggestion that WikiLeaks was going "mainstream". After the first 25 emails out of an expected 2.4 million were released, Foreign Policy wrote that it believed Syrian's on the fence would be the most affected by the release, and any instances of Syrian officials opening channels with rebels could get someone killed. Foreign Policy wrote that it expected Western officials and companies to be affected by the release, but that the Syrian government was an "open book" and the emails would confirm what was already known.

==== Global Intelligence files ====
After the release was announced, analysts questioned the value of the firm's emails, since they mostly used reports from newspapers, think tanks and political science university departments. Various outlets said WikiLeaks' description of the Stratfor leak was "like one long toot on a dog-whistle for the paranoid" that the files "seem fairly low level and gossipy" that "this particular WikiLeaks dump should probably be taken to the dump and dumped" and that one seemingly incriminating email published by The New York Times turned out to have an innocuous narrative.

Max Fisher, the associate director of The Atlantic, argued that Stratfor has a poor reputation "among foreign policy writers, analysts, and practitioners" and that as a result Anonymous and Wikileaks have exaggerated the significance of the information they released. He also suggested that Assange may have targeted a relatively unimportant firm and over-hyped the results in order to "regain some of his former glory". Daniel W. Drezner, a professor of international politics at the Fletcher School at Tufts University, wrote in Foreign Policy that the "docu-dump says more about Wikileaks and Anonymous than it does about anything else" and criticized the hype of the release. Australian Broadcasting Corporation foreign correspondent and Stratfor subscriber Mark Corcoran also wrote that the e-mails showed Stratfor's methods used to gather information are similar to those employed by journalists, though he wrote that the quality of its reports are often inferior to news reports.

==== ICWatch ====
Ian Paul of PC World voiced concern for the safety of the individuals listed in the database.

==== DNC emails ====
On July 27, 2016, The New York Times reported that Julian Assange, in an interview on British ITV on June 12, 2016, had "made it clear that he hoped to harm Hillary Clinton's chances of winning the presidency," and that in a later interview on the program Democracy Now! on July 25, 2016, the first day of the Democratic National Convention, he acknowledged that "he had timed their release to coincide with the Democratic convention." In an interview with CNN, Assange would neither confirm nor deny who WikiLeaks' sources were; he claimed that his website "... might release 'a lot more material' relevant to the US electoral campaign ..."

Following the publication of the stolen emails, NSA whistleblower Edward Snowden criticized WikiLeaks for its wholesale leakage of data, writing that "their hostility to even modest curation is a mistake". The Washington Post contrasted the difference between WikiLeaks' practices and Snowden's disclosure of information about NSA: while Snowden worked with journalists to vet documents (withholding some where it would endanger national security), WikiLeaks' "more radical" approach involves the dumping of "massive, searchable caches online with few—if any—apparent efforts to remove sensitive personal information."

On July 25, 2016, Anne Applebaum, columnist for the Washington Post, wrote that:

... with the exception of a few people on Twitter and a handful of print journalists, most of those covering this story, especially on television, are not interested in the nature of the hackers, and they are not asking why the Russians apparently chose to pass the emails on to WikiLeaks at this particular moment, on the eve of the Democratic National Convention. They are focusing instead on the content of what were meant to be private emails ...

She went on to describe in detail other Russian destabilization campaigns in Eastern European countries.

==== Podesta emails ====
Sociology professor Zeynep Tufekci criticized how WikiLeaks handled the release of the Podesta emails, writing, "Taking one campaign manager's email account and releasing it with zero curation in the last month of an election needs to be treated as what it is: political sabotage, not whistle-blowing." In an op-ed for The Intercept, James Risen criticized the media for its reporting on emails, arguing that the hacking of the emails was a more significant story than the content of the emails themselves. Thomas Frank, writing in an editorial column for The Guardian, argued that the emails gave an "unprecedented view into the workings of the elite, and how it looks after itself".

Glen Caplin, a spokesman for the Clinton campaign, said, "By dribbling these out every day WikiLeaks is proving they are nothing but a propaganda arm of the Kremlin with a political agenda doing [Vladimir] Putin's dirty work to help elect Donald Trump." When asked to comment on the emails' release, president Vladimir Putin replied that Russia was being falsely accused. He said, "The hysteria is merely caused by the fact that somebody needs to divert the attention of the American people from the essence of what was exposed by the hackers."

==== Vault 7 ====
On 7 March 2017, Nathan White, Senior Legislative Manager at the Internet advocacy group Access Now, writes:

Today, our digital security has been compromised because the CIA has been stockpiling vulnerabilities rather than working with companies to patch them. The United States is supposed to have a process that helps secure our digital devices and services — the 'Vulnerabilities Equities Process.' Many of these vulnerabilities could have been responsibly disclosed and patched. This leak proves the inherent digital risk of stockpiling vulnerabilities rather than fixing them.

On 8 March 2017, Lee Mathews, a contributor to Forbes, wrote that most of the hacking techniques described in Vault 7 were already known to many cybersecurity experts. On 8 March 2017, some noted that the revealed techniques and tools are most likely to be used for more targeted surveillance revealed by Edward Snowden.

On the day the Vault 7 documents were first released, WikiLeaks described UMBRAGE as "a substantial library of attack techniques 'stolen' from malware produced in other states including the Russian Federation," and tweeted, "CIA steals other groups virus and malware facilitating false flag attacks." A conspiracy theory soon emerged alleging that the CIA framed the Russian government for interfering in the 2016 U.S. elections. Conservative commentators such as Sean Hannity and Ann Coulter speculated about this possibility on Twitter, and Rush Limbaugh discussed it on his radio show. Russian foreign minister Sergey Lavrov said that Vault 7 showed that "the CIA could get access to such 'fingerprints' and then use them."

Cybersecurity writers, such as Ben Buchanan and Kevin Poulsen, were sceptical of those theories. Poulsen wrote, "The leaked catalog isn't organized by country of origin, and the specific malware used by the Russian DNC hackers is nowhere on the list."

==== Spy Files Russia ====
Wired wrote that most of the information was already public, and the release "wasn't exactly the type of radical secret-sharing WikiLeaks typically engages in." Andrei Soldatov, a Russian journalist specialising in digital surveillance and Russian intelligence said he did not think it was a real expose. Soldatov said the release was "more than nothing. At least we got some hint about the data exchange interface between telecoms and secret services." Moscow-based journalist Fred Weir said "experts say it casts a timely spotlight on the vast surveillance operations mounted by Russian security services." Ben Buchanan, a postdoctoral fellow at the Harvard Kennedy School's Belfer Center and author of the book The Cybersecurity Dilemma said the SORM system "has been known for some time, though the documents seem to provide additional technical specifications". Some suggested that Spy Files Russia was an approved release by the Russian government meant to shield them from criticism of collusion with WikiLeaks during the 2016 US presidential election.

=== Media partners ===
In September 2011, WikiLeaks' media partners strongly criticised the organisation's decision to release the uncensored archive of diplomatic cables in a searchable format. According to The Guardian, several thousand files in the archive were marked "strictly protect" which indicated officials thought sources could be endangered by their release. In a joint statement, The Guardian, El País, New York Times and Der Spiegel said they "deplore the decision of WikiLeaks to publish the unredacted state department cables, which may put sources at risk" and "we cannot defend the needless publication of the complete data - indeed, we are united in condemning it". Le Monde told the Associated Press it would also sign the statement. In response, WikiLeaks accused The Guardian of false statements and nepotism. Out of concern for those involved, Reporters Without Borders temporarily suspended their WikiLeaks mirror.

=== People's Republic of China ===
Chinese journalist Shi Tao was sentenced to 10 years imprisonment, in 2005 after publicising an email from Chinese officials about the anniversary of the Tiananmen Square massacre.

=== Russian Federation ===
Russian investigative reporter Andrei Soldatov has criticised WikiLeaks for disclosing documents "without checking of the facts, without putting them in context, and without analysing them". Soldatov believes WikiLeaks is "filling the gap" left by the decline of investigative journalism with a sensationalist alternative while journalistic support of WikiLeaks is motivated by anger over declining funding and resources for investigative reporting.

== Response from corporations ==
In 2010 the Bank of America employed the services of a collection of information security firms, known as Team Themis, when the bank became concerned about information that WikiLeaks held about it and was planning to release. Team Themis included private intelligence and security firms HBGary Federal, Palantir Technologies and Berico Technologies. In 2011 hacktivist group Anonymous released emails it had obtained from HBGary Federal. Among other things, the emails revealed that Team Themis had planned to sabotage and discredit WikiLeaks. One plan was to attack WikiLeaks servers and obtain information about document submitters to "kill the project". Another was to submit fake documents to WikiLeaks and then call out the error. A further plan involved pressuring supporters of WikiLeaks such as journalist Glenn Greenwald. The plans were not implemented and, after the emails were published, Palantir CEO Alex Karp issued a public apology for his company's role.

=== U.S. diplomatic cables leak responses ===
According to The Times (London), WikiLeaks and its members have complained about continuing harassment and surveillance by law enforcement and intelligence organisations, including extended detention, seizure of computers, veiled threats, "covert following and hidden photography". Two lawyers for Julian Assange in the United Kingdom told The Guardian that they believed they were being watched by the security services after the U.S. cables leak, which started on 28 November 2010.

Furthermore, several companies ended association with WikiLeaks. After providing 24-hour notification, American-owned EveryDNS deleted WikiLeaks from its entries on 2 December 2010, citing DDoS attacks that "threatened the stability of its infrastructure". The website's 'info' DNS lookup remained operational at alternative addresses for direct access respectively to the WikiLeaks and Cablegate websites. On the same day, Amazon.com severed its association with WikiLeaks, to which it was providing infrastructure services, after an intervention by an aide of U.S. Senator Joe Lieberman. Amazon denied acting under political pressure, citing a violation of its terms of service. Citing indirect pressure from the U.S. Government, Tableau Software also deleted WikiLeaks' data from its website for people to use for data visualisation.

During the days following, hundreds of (and eventually more than a thousand) mirror websites of the WikiLeaks website were established, and the Anonymous group of Internet activists asked sympathizers to attack the websites of companies which opposed WikiLeaks, under the banner of Operation Payback, previously directed at anti-piracy organisations. AFP reported that attempts to deactivate the wikileaks.org address had resulted in the website surviving via the so-called Streisand effect, whereby attempts to censor information online causes it to be replicated in many places.

On 3 December, PayPal, the payment processor owned by eBay, permanently ended the account of the Wau Holland Foundation that had been redirecting donations to WikiLeaks. PayPal alleged that the account violated its "Acceptable Use Policy", specifically that the account was used for "activities that encourage, promote, facilitate or instruct others to engage in illegal activity". The Vice-President of PayPal stated later that they stopped accepting payments after the "State Department told us these were illegal activities. It was straightforward." Later the same day, he said that his previous statement was incorrect, and that it was in fact based on a letter from the State Department to WikiLeaks. On 8 December 2010, the Wau Holland Foundation released a press statement, saying it has filed a legal action against PayPal for blocking its account used for WikiLeaks payments and for libel due to PayPal's allegations of "illegal activity".

On the same day, MasterCard announced that it was "taking action to ensure that WikiLeaks can no longer accept MasterCard-branded products", adding "MasterCard rules prohibit customers from directly or indirectly engaging in or facilitating any action that is illegal." The next day, Visa Inc. announced it was suspending payments to WikiLeaks, pending "further investigations". In a move of support for WikiLeaks, the organisation XIPWIRE established a way to donate to WikiLeaks, and waived their fees. Datacell, the Iceland-based IT company controlled by Swiss investors that enabled WikiLeaks to accept credit card donations, announced that it would take legal action against Visa Europe and MasterCard, in order to resume allowing payments to the website.

On 7 December 2010, The Guardian stated that people could donate to WikiLeaks via Commerzbank in Kassel, Germany, or Landsbanki in Iceland, or by post to a post office box at the University of Melbourne or at the wikileaks.ch domain.

On 21 December, media reported that Apple Inc. had removed an application from its App Store, which provided access to the embassy cable leaks.

As part of its 'Initial Assessments Pursuant to... WikiLeaks', the US Presidential Executive Office has issued a memorandum to the heads of Executive Departments and Agencies asking whether they have an 'insider threat program'.

On 14 July 2011, WikiLeaks and DataCell ehf. of Iceland filed a complaint against the international card companies, VISA Europe and MasterCard Europe, for infringement of the antitrust rules of the EU, in response to their withdrawal of financial services to the organisation. In a joint press release, the organisations stated: "The closure by VISA Europe and MasterCard of Datcell's access to the payment card networks in order to stop donations to WikiLeaks violates the competition rules of the European Community." DataCell filed a complaint with the European Commission on 14 July 2011.

=== Response from the financial industry ===
Since the publications of CableGate, WikiLeaks has experienced an unprecedented global financial blockade by major finance companies including MasterCard, Visa and PayPal although there has been no legal accusation of any wrongdoing.

On 22 January 2010, the Internet payment intermediary PayPal suspended WikiLeaks' donation account and froze its assets. WikiLeaks said that this had happened before, and was done for "no obvious reason".

In August 2010, the internet payment company Moneybookers closed WikiLeaks' account and sent Assange a letter saying "Following an audit of your account by our security department, we must advise that your account has been closed ... to comply with money laundering or other investigations conducted by government authorities." After Assange asked what the problem was, Moneybookers sent another email saying that initially the "account was suspended due to being accessed from a blacklisted IP address. However, following recent publicity and the subsequently addition of the WikiLeaks entity to blacklists in Australia and watchlists in the USA, we have terminated the business relationship." According to The Guardian, the apparent blacklisting came a few days after the Pentagon expressed anger at WikiLeaks for publishing the Afghan War logs.

In December 2010, PayPal again suspended WikiLeaks' account, thereby stopping donations through its service. PayPal said it had taken action after the US State Department sent a letter to Wikileaks stating that Wikileaks' activities were illegal in the US. Hendrik Fulda, vice-president of the Wau Holland Foundation, said that the Foundation had been receiving twice as many donations through PayPal as through normal banks before PayPal's decision to suspend WikiLeaks' account.

On 18 December 2010, Bank of America announced it would "not process transactions of any type that we have reason to believe are intended for Wikileaks," because "Wikileaks may be engaged in activities... inconsistent with our internal policies for processing payments". WikiLeaks responded in a tweet by encouraging their sympathizers who were BoA customers to close their accounts.

Mastercard and Visa Europe also decided to stop accepting payments to WikiLeaks. Amazon and Swiss bank PostFinance had previously stopped dealing with WikiLeaks. Datacell, the IT company that enabled WikiLeaks to accept credit and debit card donations, threatened Mastercard and Visa with legal action to enforce the resumption of payments to WikiLeaks. Datacell said Visa's action was the result of political pressure.

Late in 2010, Bank of America communicated with the law company Hunton & Williams to stop WikiLeaks. Hunton & Williams assembled a group of security specialists, HBGary Federal, Palantir Technologies, and Berico Technologies.

The UN High Commissioner for Human Rights stated that Visa, MasterCard, and Amazon may have been "violating WikiLeaks' right to freedom of expression" by withdrawing their services.

During 5 and 6 February 2011, the group Anonymous hacked HBGary's website, copied tens of thousands of documents from HBGary, posted tens of thousands of company emails online, and usurped Barr's Twitter account in revenge. Some of the documents taken by Anonymous show HBGary Federal was working on behalf of Bank of America to respond to WikiLeaks' planned release of the bank's internal documents. Emails detailed a supposed business proposal by HBGary to assist Bank of America's law company, Hunton & Williams, and revealed that the companies were willing to violate the law to damage WikiLeaks and Anonymous.

CEO Aaron Barr thought he'd uncovered the hackers' identities and like rats, they'd scurry for cover. If he could nail them, he could cover up the crimes H&W, HBGary, and BoA planned, bring down WikiLeaks, decapitate Anonymous, and place his opponents in prison while collecting a cool fee. He thought he was 88% right; he was 88% wrong.

In October 2011, Julian Assange said the financial blockade had destroyed 95% of WikiLeaks' revenues and announced that it was suspending publishing operations in order to concentrate on fighting the blockade and raising new funds.

In response to the financial blockade of Wikileaks, Glenn Greenwald and others created the Freedom of the Press Foundation in order "to block the US government from ever again being able to attack and suffocate an independent journalistic enterprise the way it did with WikiLeaks".

On 18 July 2012, WikiLeaks, shunned by the financial industry and almost insolvent, announced that it had found a new method to accept donations. Accordingly, the Fund for the Defense of Net Neutrality (FDNN) had agreed to channel contributions via Carte Bleue, and WikiLeaks claimed that contractual obligation would prevent Visa and MasterCard blocking participation with such transactions.

On 24 January 2014, WikiLeaks announced via Twitter that the majority of its donations came from (the cryptocurrencies) Litecoin and Bitcoin. WikiLeaks massive returns from early investment into Bitcoin cryptocurrency has helped the organisation to survive various legal and financial hardships.

In December 2017, after five years of processing donations on behalf of WikiLeaks, Freedom of the Press Foundation's board unanimously found that the financial blockade of WikiLeaks by major payment processors was no longer in effect, and severed ties with WikiLeaks as of 8 January 2018.

== Support for WikiLeaks ==
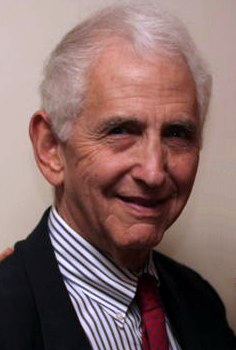
Daniel Ellsberg (2006) has made numerous media interviews supporting WikiLeaks.

In July 2010 Veterans for Peace president Mike Ferner editorialised on the group's website "neither Wikileaks nor the soldier or soldiers who divulged the documents should be prosecuted for revealing this information. We should give them a medal."

Documentary filmmaker John Pilger wrote an August 2010 editorial in the Australian publication Green Left titled "Wikileaks must be defended". In it, Pilger said WikiLeaks represented the interests of "public accountability" and a new form of journalism at odds with "the dominant section ... devoted merely to taking down what cynical and malign power tells it."

Daniel Ellsberg, the man who released the Pentagon Papers in 1971, has been a frequent defender of WikiLeaks. Following the November 2010 release of U.S. diplomatic cables, Ellsberg rejected criticism that the site was endangering the lives of U.S. military personnel and intelligence assets stating "not one single soldier or informant has been in danger from any of the WikiLeaks releases. That risk has been largely overblown." Ellsberg went on to note that government claims to the contrary were "a script that they roll out every time there's a leak of any sort". Following the US diplomatic cable release, which a number of media reports sought to differentiate from Ellsberg's whistleblowing, Ellsberg said, "EVERY attack now made on WikiLeaks and Julian Assange was made against me and the release of the Pentagon Papers at the time."

Republican congressman Connie Mack IV of Florida also praised WikiLeaks in 2010, stating that Americans have a right to know the contents of the leaks, "no matter how we acquire that knowledge".

Senior Australian media professionals expressed their support for WikiLeaks in a letter to Australian Prime Minister Julia Gillard. The letter was initiated by the Walkley Foundation, who present the yearly Walkley Awards for Excellence in Journalism. The letter was signed by "the ten members of the Walkley Advisory Board as well as editors of major Australian newspapers and news websites and the news directors of the country's three commercial TV networks and two public broadcasters." Their position (an extract from the letter) is summarised as follows:

In essence, WikiLeaks, an organisation that aims to expose official secrets, is doing what the media have always done: bringing to light material that governments would prefer to keep secret. It is the media's duty to responsibly report such material if it comes into their possession. To aggressively attempt to shut WikiLeaks down, to threaten to prosecute those who publish official leaks, and to pressure companies to cease doing commercial business with WikiLeaks, is a serious threat to democracy, which relies on a free and fearless press."

Following the November 2010 leak of United States diplomatic cables, The Atlantic, in a staff editorial, opined "Wikileaks is a powerful new way for reporters and human rights advocates to leverage global information technology systems to break the heavy veil of government and corporate secrecy that is slowly suffocating the American press." Calling legal and physical threats against WikiLeaks volunteers "shameful" the magazine went on to state, "Not since President Richard Nixon directed his minions to go after Pentagon Papers leaker Daniel Ellsberg and New York Times reporter Neil Sheehan ... has a working journalist and his source been subjected to the kind of official intimidation and threats that have been directed at Assange and Manning by high-ranking members of the Obama Administration."

On 4 December 2010, Reporters Without Borders condemned the "blocking, cyber-attacks and political pressure" being directed at WikiLeaks. The organisation is also concerned by some of the extreme comments made by American authorities concerning WikiLeaks. On 21 December the organisation announced it will host a mirror website for the leaked US diplomatic cables being published by WikiLeaks.

In an article titled "Only WikiLeaks can save US policy" published on the online foreign affairs magazine The Diplomat, former CIA counter-terrorism expert Michael Scheuer said the source of interest in WikiLeaks revelations was in the inherent dishonesty of recent U.S. administrations.

Evan Hughes, editor-in-chief of wired.com, published his support for WikiLeaks in a 2009 online editorial titled "Why WikiLeaks is Good for America". Despite an often contentious relationship between Wired and WikiLeaks, with the former having been accused by the latter of complicity in the identification and arrest of Chelsea Manning, Hughes argued that "WikiLeaks stands to improve our democracy, not weaken it." He went on to note that "The greatest threat we face right now from WikiLeaks is not the information it has spilled and may spill in the future, but the reactionary response to it that's building in the United States that promises to repudiate the rule of law and our free speech traditions, if left unchecked."

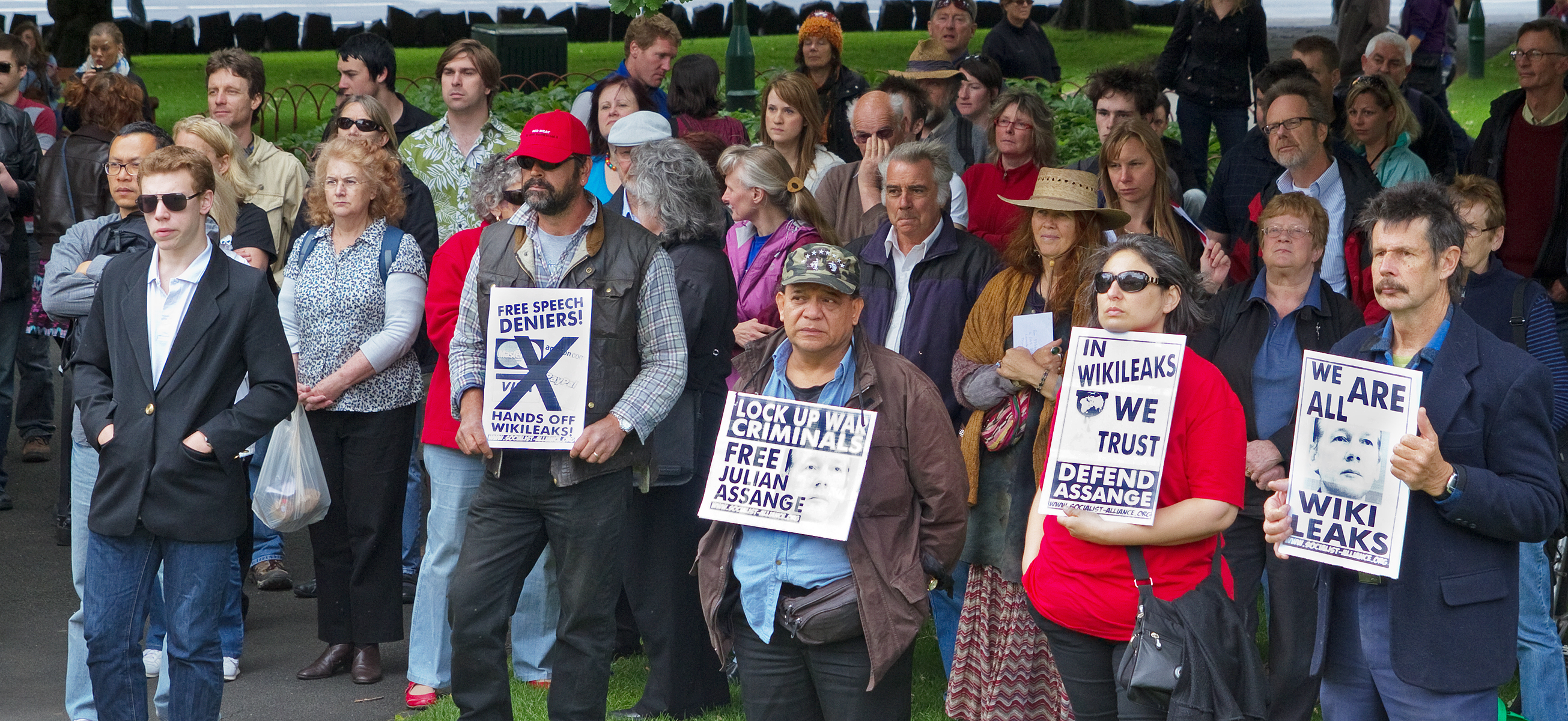
A December 2010 rally in Australia protesting the Australian government's treatment of Julian Assange

The New York Times reported that over 200 WikiLeaks mirror sites sprang up after some hosting companies cut their services to the company. On 5 December, a group of activists and hackers known as "Anonymous" called upon supporters to attack sites of companies that oppose WikiLeaks as part of Operation Avenge Assange. PayPal has been targeted following their decision to stop processing donations for WikiLeaks. Gregg Housh, who previously worked on other projects with Anonymous, said that he had noticed an organised attempt taking place to attack companies that have not supported WikiLeaks. In reference to the support being shown for WikiLeaks, Mr. Housh said; "The reason is amazingly simple, we all believe that information should be free, and the Internet should be free." On 8 December 2010, the PayPal website was victim of a denial-of-service attack by Anonymous. Later that day, PayPal announced in their blog that they will release all remaining funds in the account to the foundation that was raising funds for WikiLeaks. On the same day, the websites of Visa and MasterCard were attacked by WikiLeaks supporters. By then over 1,200 mirror sites had been set up for hosting content no longer accessible at WikiLeaks.com. Anonymous also issued a fresh statement; "While we don't have much of an affiliation with WikiLeaks, we fight for the same reasons. We want transparency, and we counter censorship ... This is why we intend to utilise our resources to raise awareness, attack those against, and support those who are helping led our world to freedom and democracy."

In December 2010, the Internet Society stated that despite the international concern about the content released by WikiLeaks, "we nevertheless believe it must be subject to the same laws and policies of availability as all Internet sites" and that "free expression should not be restricted by governmental or private controls over computer hardware or software, telecommunications infrastructure, or other essential components of the Internet". ISOC also called for appropriate action to "pursue and prosecute entities (if any) that acted maliciously to take it [WikiLeaks] off the air" because suppressing communication would merely serve to "undermine the integrity of the global Internet and its operation".

On 8 December 2010 a petition was launched on Avaaz in support of WikiLeaks, which was signed by over 250 thousand people within the first few hours, the total number went up to 600 thousand by 15 December 2010.

In early December 2010, Noam Chomsky offered his support to protesters across Australia planning to take to the streets in defence of WikiLeaks. In an interview for Democracy Now!, Chomsky criticised the government response, saying, "perhaps the most dramatic revelation ... is the bitter hatred of democracy that is revealed both by the U.S. Government – Hillary Clinton, others – and also by the diplomatic service."

In his 2015 book, L'Art de la révolte. Snowden, Assange, Manning, philosopher Geoffroy de Lagasnerie wrote "WikiLeaks rises up against the assumption that a democratic state should accept non-democratic spheres, outside the law, where arbitrary decisions reign. The organisation ... has taken as its slogan: 'Privacy for the weak, transparency for the powerful' ".

=== Awards and nominations ===
In 2008, Index on Censorship presented WikiLeaks with their inaugural Economist New Media Award.

In 2009, Amnesty International awarded WikiLeaks their Media Award for exposing "extra judicial killings and disappearances" in Kenya.

In 2009, Ars Electronica awarded WikiLeaks an Award of Distinction in the Digital Communities category.

In 2011, Walkley Foundation for Journalism awarded the "Most outstanding contribution to journalism" Walkley Award to WikiLeaks. The Sydney Peace Foundation Gold Medal, the Martha Gellhorn Prize for Journalism, the Blanquerna Award for Best Communicator, the Walkley Award for Most Outstanding Contribution to Journalism, the Voltaire Award for Free Speech, the International Piero Passetti Journalism Prize of the National Union of Italian Journalists, the "VII José Couso Press Freedom Award" from Colexio Profesional de Xornalistas de Galicia and Club de Prensa de Ferrol and the Blanquerna Faculty of Communication awarded the "Blanquerna Best Communicator Award" to WikiLeaks.

In 2012 the Privacy International Hero of Privacy.

In 2013 the Global Exchange Human Rights People's Choice Award, the Yoko Ono Lennon Courage Award for the Arts and the Brazilian Press Association Human Rights Award.

In 2014 the Kazakhstan Union of Journalists Top Prize.

Additionally, Wikileaks was nominated for awards but did not win:

1 February 2011, Norwegian politician and musician Snorre Valen nominated WikiLeaks for the Nobel Peace Prize, totalling six nominations for the Nobel Peace Prize in consecutive years (2010-2015) for the organisation.

2015 Wikileaks received a nomination for the UN Mandela Prize. Six nominations for the Nobel Peace Prize in consecutive years (2010-2015).

== Criticism of Wikileaks ==
WikiLeaks has attracted criticism from a variety of sources.

=== Internal conflicts and lack of transparency ===
WikiLeaks has often been criticised for demanding absolute secrecy about its activities, but openness in others.

In January 2007, John Young quit the advisory board and accused the group of being part of the CIA, an accusation which Wikileaks said would be useful for attracting submissions. Young later withdrew the accusation. He published 150 pages of WikiLeaks emails. In a 2010 interview with CNET.com Young accused the group of a lack of transparency regarding their fundraising and financial management. He went on to state his belief that WikiLeaks could not guarantee whistleblowers the anonymity or confidentiality they claimed and that he "would not trust them with information if it had any value, or if it put me at risk or anyone that I cared about at risk." He later became supportive of the group again.

Within WikiLeaks, there has been public disagreement between founder and spokesperson Julian Assange and Daniel Domscheit-Berg, the website's former German representative who was suspended by Assange. Domscheit-Berg announced on 28 September 2010 that he was leaving the organisation due to internal conflicts over management of the website.

A series of resignations of key members of WikiLeaks, including Domscheit-Berg, Herbert Snorrason, The Architect and Birgitta Jonsdottir began in September 2010, started by Assange's unliteral decision to release the Iraq War logs the next month, his internal conflicts with other members and his response to sexual assault allegations. According to Snorrason, "We found out that the level of redactions performed on the Afghanistan documents was not sufficient. I announced that if the next batch did not receive full attention, I would not be willing to cooperate."

On 25 September 2010, after being suspended by Assange for "disloyalty, insubordination and destabilisation", Daniel Domscheit-Berg, the German spokesman for WikiLeaks, told Der Spiegel that he was resigning, saying "WikiLeaks has a structural problem. I no longer want to take responsibility for it, and that's why I am leaving the project." Assange accused Domscheit-Berg of leaking information to Newsweek, with Domscheit-Berg claiming that the WikiLeaks team was unhappy with Assange's management and handling of the Afghan war document releases. Daniel Domscheit-Berg wanted greater transparency in the articles released to the public. When Domscheit-Berg resigned, the architect of WikiLeaks' submission platform and four other staffers also broke with Assange to start OpenLeaks, a new leak organisation and website with a different management and distribution philosophy.

WikiLeaks and other sources later alleged that Domscheit-Berg had copied and then deleted over 3500 unpublished whistleblower communications with some communications containing hundreds of documents, including the US government's No Fly List, 5 GB of Bank of America leaks, insider information from 20 neo-Nazi organisations, evidence of torture and government abuse of a Latin American country and US intercept information for "over a hundred Internet companies". Assange stated that Domscheit-Berg had deleted video files of the Granai massacre by a US Bomber. WikiLeaks had scheduled the video for publication before its deletion.

Domscheit-Berg said he took the files from WikiLeaks because he didn't trust its security. In Domscheit-Berg's book he wrote: "To this day, we are waiting for Julian to restore security, so that we can return the material to him, which was on the submission platform." In August 2011, Domscheit-Berg claimed he permanently deleted the files "in order to ensure that the sources are not compromised". He said that WikiLeaks' claims about the Bank of America files were "false and misleading". According to Domscheit-Berg, the Bank of America files were lost because of an IT problem when one of WikiLeaks storage drives crashed and they lost it.

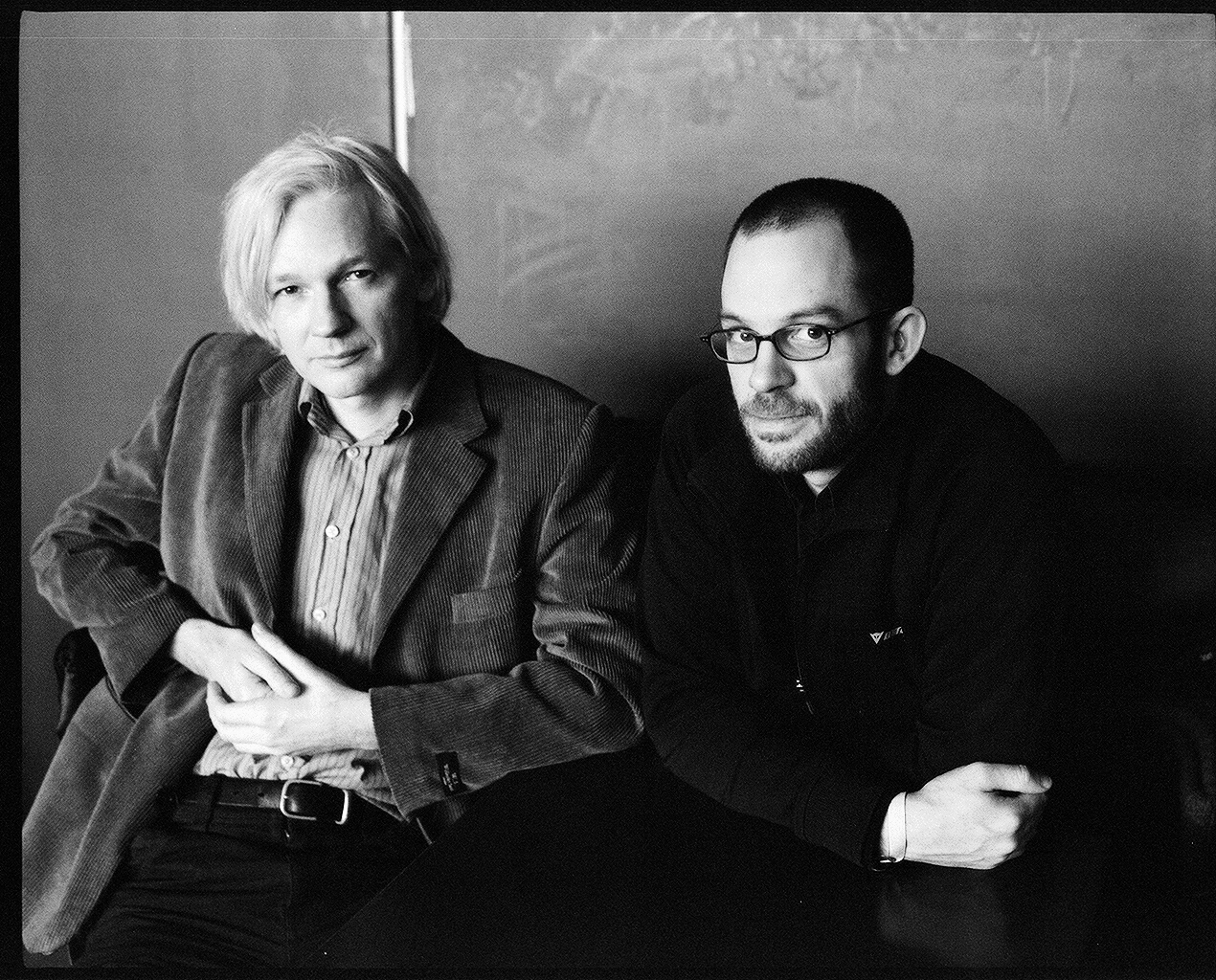
Julian Assange (left) with Daniel Domscheit-Berg who was ejected from WikiLeaks and started a rival "whistleblower" organisation named OpenLeaks

The Architect left with Domscheit-Berg, taking the code behind the submission system with him. WikiLeaks submissions stayed offline until 2015. Herbert Snorrason, a 25-year-old Icelandic university student, resigned after he challenged Assange on his decision to suspend Domscheit-Berg and was bluntly rebuked. Iceland MP Birgitta Jónsdóttir also left WikiLeaks, citing lack of transparency, lack of structure, and poor communication flow in the organisation. According to the British newspaper, The Independent, at least a dozen key supporters of WikiLeaks left the website during 2010.

==== Non-disclosure agreements ====
Those working for WikiLeaks are reportedly required to sign sweeping non-disclosure agreements covering all conversations, conduct, and material, with Assange having sole power over disclosure. The penalty for non-compliance in one such agreement was reportedly £12 million. WikiLeaks has been challenged for this practice, as it is seen to be hypocritical for an organisation dedicated to transparency to limit the transparency of its inner workings and limit the accountability of powerful individuals in the organisation.

=== Allegations of hacking ===
In January 2011, Bill Keller described The New York Times work with WikiLeaks, saying he was unsure if he was more nervous about intelligence agencies or "the cyberwiles of WikiLeaks itself." According to Keller, "at a point when relations between the news organizations and WikiLeaks were rocky, at least three people associated with this project had inexplicable activity in their e-mail that suggested someone was hacking into their accounts." According to WikiLeaks: Inside Julian Assange's War on Secrecy, during the Guardian's collaboration with WikiLeaks, one of their reporters suspected that Assange had hacked into his email after commenting on security and the contents of his email.

According to Andrew O'Hagan, after Mubarak closed the mobile phone networks during the 2011 Egyptian revolution, Assange and others at WikiLeaks hacked into Nortel to reverse it.

According to Julian Assange: The Unauthorised Autobiography, Icelandic WikiLeaks member Smári McCarthy gave British-American journalist Heather Brooke copies of US diplomatic cable leak. After seeing the reaction of other WikiLeaks members when they learned this, McCarthy remotely accessed Brooke's computer and wiped the files. According to McCarthy, Brooke had given him permission to access her system, but not delete the file. McCarthy explained his actions to Brooke saying, "I've been put under a lot of very serious pressure and I'm afraid for my security." According to Wired in 2011, the events could put WikiLeaks in legal jeopardy.

In June 2011, WikiLeaks representative Sigurdur Thordarson contacted members of the Anonymous group LulzSec and told them to join a new IRC server. Thordarson said he and Assange wanted help infiltrating several Icelandic corporate and government sites. They explained that they wanted evidence of corruption or that the government was unfairly targeting WikiLeaks and that evidence could help start an uprising in Iceland. LulzSec hackers Sabu and Topiary were skeptical but later believed that Assange was personally part of the chat. According to another former core member of LulzSec, members of the group failed to access Icelandic government servers when the server didn't respond correctly. Thordarson offered LulzSec an encrypted spreadsheet of classified government data that needed to be decrypted and explained that WikiLeaks had computers at MIT trying unsuccessfully for two weeks. Sabu took over communicating with WikiLeaks, and Assange visited the chat several more times in the next few weeks. According to chat logs, Thordarson and Sabu talked about submitting the Syria files and about recruiting Sabu to become member of WikiLeaks, and WikiLeaks gave the hackers a script to help search emails. In June 2020, the Department of Justice filed an indictment against Assange that included allegations he conspired and tried to recruit Anonymous and LulzSec hackers.

In 2016, WikiLeaks sent Donald Trump Jr. a private message writing, "A PAC run anti-Trump site putintrump.org is about to launch. The PAC is a recycled pro-Iraq war PAC. We have guessed the password. It is 'putintrump.' See 'About' for who is behind it. Any comments?" According to the site's owner, Rob Glaser, the password was for debriefed journalists to access the website before the embargo ended. Many legal experts consider guessing passwords to be a violation of the Computer Fraud and Abuse Act. According to law professor Orin Kerr, "If anyone actually entered in the username and password or entered in the password to the website, that's a federal crime. And whoever would have passed on the email with the intent that someone else use it is committing a crime." According to the Mueller Report, Trump Jr. said he "tried the password and it works".

=== 2016 U.S. presidential election ===
==== Allegations of anti-Clinton and pro-Trump bias ====
Assange wrote on WikiLeaks in February 2016: "I have had years of experience in dealing with Hillary Clinton and have read thousands of her cables. Hillary lacks judgement and will push the United States into endless, stupid wars which spread terrorism. ... she certainly should not become president of the United States." In a 2017 interview by Amy Goodman, Julian Assange said that choosing between Hillary Clinton and Donald Trump is like choosing between cholera or gonorrhea. "Personally, I would prefer neither." WikiLeaks editor Sarah Harrison stated that the site was not choosing which damaging publications to release, rather releasing information available to them. In conversations that were leaked in February 2018, Assange expressed a preference for a Republican victory in the 2016 election, saying that "Dems+Media+liberals would [sic] then form a block to reign [sic] in their worst qualities. With Hillary in charge, GOP will be pushing for her worst qualities, dems+media+neoliberals will be mute." In further leaked correspondence with the Trump campaign on election day (8 November 2016), WikiLeaks encouraged the Trump campaign to contest the election results as being "rigged" should they lose.

Having released information that exposed the inner workings of a broad range of organisations and politicians, WikiLeaks started by 2016 to focus almost exclusively on Democratic presidential candidate Hillary Clinton. In the 2016 U.S. presidential election, WikiLeaks only exposed material damaging to the Democratic National Committee and Hillary Clinton. WikiLeaks even rejected the opportunity to publish unrelated leaks, because it dedicated all its resources to Hillary Clinton and the Democratic Party. According to The New York Times, WikiLeaks timed one of its large leaks so that it would happen on the eve of the Democratic Convention. The Washington Post noted that the leaks came at an important sensitive moment in the Clinton campaign, as she was preparing to announce her vice-presidential pick and unite the party behind her. The Sunlight Foundation, an organisation that advocates for open government, said that such actions meant that WikiLeaks was no longer striving to be transparent but rather sought to achieve political goals.

WikiLeaks explained its actions in a 2017 statement to Foreign Policy: "WikiLeaks schedules publications to maximize readership and reader engagement. During distracting media events such as the Olympics or a high profile election, unrelated publications are sometimes delayed until the distraction passes but never are rejected for this reason." On 7 October 2016, an hour after the media had begun to dedicate wall-to-wall coverage of the revelation that Trump had bragged on video about sexually harassing women, WikiLeaks began to release emails hacked from the personal account of Clinton campaign chairman John Podesta. Podesta suggested that the emails were timed to deflect attention from the Trump tapes.

==== Secret correspondence between WikiLeaks and Donald Trump Jr. ====
In November 2017, it was revealed that the WikiLeaks Twitter account secretly corresponded with Donald Trump Jr. during the 2016 presidential election. The correspondence shows how WikiLeaks actively solicited the co-operation of Trump Jr., a campaign surrogate and advisor in the campaign of his father. WikiLeaks urged the Trump campaign to reject the results of the 2016 presidential election at a time when it looked as if the Trump campaign would lose. WikiLeaks suggested the Trump campaign leak Trump's taxes to them. WikiLeaks asked Trump Jr. to publicise a comment by Hillary Clinton about wanting to "just drone" Assange. WikiLeaks also shared a link to a site that would help people to search through WikiLeaks documents. Trump Jr. shared both. After the election, WikiLeaks also requested that the president-elect push Australia to appoint Assange as ambassador to the US. Trump Jr. provided this correspondence to congressional investigators looking into Russian interference in the 2016 election.

The exchanges led to criticism of WikiLeaks by some former supporters. Assange said the Clinton campaign was "constantly slandering" WikiLeaks of being a 'pro-Trump' 'pro-Russia' source. Journalist Barrett Brown, a who had previously defended WikiLeaks, was tweeted that Assange was "complaining about 'slander' of being pro-Trump IN THE ACTUAL COURSE OF COLLABORATING WITH TRUMP". He also wrote: "Was "Wikileaks staff" lying on Nov 10 2016 when they claimed "The allegations that we have colluded with Trump, or any other candidate for that matter, or with Russia, are just groundless and false", or did Assange lie to them?"

Brown said Assange had acted "as a covert political operative", thus betraying WikiLeaks' focus on exposing "corporate and government wrongdoing". He considered the latter to be "an appropriate thing to do", but that "working with an authoritarian would-be leader to deceive the public is indefensible and disgusting".

=== Allegations of association with Russian government ===
According to the Associated Press, leaked documents from WikiLeaks include an unsigned letter from Julian Assange authorising Israel Shamir to seek a Russian visa on his behalf in 2010. WikiLeaks said Assange never applied for the visa or wrote the letter. According to the New York Times, in November 2010 "Assange had mused about seeking refuge in Russia", and Russia issued Assange a visa in January 2011.

In February 2011, David Leigh said that "[b]ecause America is after him and because Sarah Palin wants him hunted down like Osama bin Laden and so forth, he's turning round to the Russians who are quite enjoying the discomfiture of the United States ... he's palling up with them and giving material to very unsuitable people".

In 2012, as WikiLeaks was under a financial blockade, Assange began to host World Tomorrow, a television show that was distributed by Journeyman Pictures and aired on RT.

In 2013, the Russian national newspaper Izvestia reported that Russian intelligence officers had coordinated with WikiLeaks to get Edward Snowden's flight from Hong Kong to Moscow. Snowden was accompanied by Wikileaks employee Sarah Harrison. Izvestia reported that Snowden and Harrison intended to stay in Moscow for a short time before taking an Aeroflot flight to Cuba, and from there travel to Venezuela. In 2015, Assange told reporters that he had told Snowden to take asylum in Russia instead of Ecuador because Russia was one of the few places in the world where the CIA's influence did not reach. The Guardian wrote that this was at odds with WikiLeaks' statement at the time that Snowden became stranded in Russia after his US passport was revoked.

In 2015, it was reported by Fernando Villavicencio that Assange requested he be allowed to "choose his own Security Service inside the embassy, suggesting the use of Russians". The article said the then Ecuadorian intelligence service SENAIN said "would have been the equivalent of 'a coup in the embassy'".

In April 2016, WikiLeaks tweeted criticism of the Panama Papers, which had among other things revealed Russian businesses and individuals linked with offshore ties. Assange said that journalists had "cherry-picked" documents to maximise "Putin bashing, North Korea bashing, sanctions bashing, etc." while avoiding mention of Western figures. The WikiLeaks Twitter account tweeted, "#PanamaPapers Putin attack was produced by OCCRP which targets Russia & former USSR and was funded by USAID and [George] Soros". Putin later dismissed the Panama Papers by citing WikiLeaks: "WikiLeaks has showed us that official people and official organs of the U.S. are behind this." According to The New York Times "there is no evidence suggesting that the United States government had a role in releasing the Panama Papers".

In August 2016, after WikiLeaks published thousands of DNC emails, DNC officials and a number of cybersecurity experts and cybersecurity firms claimed that Russian intelligence had hacked the e-mails and leaked them to WikiLeaks. Assange said that Russia was not the source of the documents and that the Clinton campaign was stoking "a neo-McCarthy hysteria". In October 2016, the US intelligence community said that it was "confident that the Russian Government directed the recent compromises of e-mails from U.S. persons and institutions, including from U.S. political organizations". The US intelligence agencies said that the hacks were consistent with the methods of Russian-directed efforts, and that people high up within the Kremlin were likely involved. On 14 October 2016, CNN stated that "there is mounting evidence that the Russian government is supplying WikiLeaks with hacked emails pertaining to the U.S. presidential election."

WikiLeaks said it had no connection with Russia. When asked about Guccifer 2.0's leaks, WikiLeaks founder Julian Assange said "These look very much like they're from the Russians. But in some ways, they look very amateur, and almost look too much like the Russians." President Putin stated that there was no Russian involvement in the election. In August 2016, a New York Times story asked whether WikiLeaks had "become a laundering machine for compromising material gathered by Russian spies". It wrote that US officials believed it was unlikely there were direct ties between Wikileaks and Russian intelligence agencies. A report by the Central Intelligence Agency shared with senators in 2016 concluded that Russia intelligence operatives provided materials to WikiLeaks in an effort to help Donald Trump's election bid.

In September 2016, the Daily Dot wrote that according to leaked court documents and a chatlog, a WikiLeaks release excluded evidence of a €2 billion transaction between the Syrian government and a government-owned Russian bank. Responding to the Daily Dot, WikiLeaks said that all the Syria files they had obtained had been published. Their spokesperson also stated, in reference to the Daily Dot's reporting of the story: "Go right ahead, but you can be sure we will return the favour one day."

In December 2016, Julian Assange said that WikiLeaks wasn't necessary in Russia because there are "competitors to WikiLeaks" and the "many vibrant publications, online blogs, and Kremlin critics" like "Novaya Gazeta, in which different parts of society in Moscow are permitted to critique each other." Assange also cited WikiLeaks not having staff that spoke Russian and being focused on English-speaking cultures. Salon, the Guardian and others criticised Assange for being "dishonest" about Russia. In 2010, WikiLeaks had announced a partnership with Novaya Gazeta.

In March 2017, The Moscow Times wrote that a former WikiLeaks collaborator said that "in recent years, WikiLeaks and the Russian state have effectively joined forces." The article reported that, since submissions to the Wikileaks portal are anonymous and encrypted, it was very difficult for Wikileaks to trace their source. Mark Galeotti, a researcher at the Institute of International Relations Prague and an expert on the Russian security services, said he had suspicions "that things are sometimes fed in, and [WikiLeaks does] know where they came from." Galeotti said Assange would have to be "extraordinarily stupid and naive" not to conclude the DNC leaks came from Russia. According to the Mueller indictment, WikiLeaks knew the source was the Russian Guccifer 2.0 persona.

In April 2017, CIA Director Mike Pompeo stated: "It is time to call out WikiLeaks for what it really is – a non-state hostile intelligence service often abetted by state actors like Russia." Pompeo said that the US Intelligence Community had concluded that Russia's "primary propaganda outlet", RT had "actively collaborated" with WikiLeaks.

In August 2017, Foreign Policy wrote that WikiLeaks had in the summer of 2016 turned down a large cache of documents containing information damaging to the Russian government. WikiLeaks stated that, "As far as we recall these are already public ... WikiLeaks rejects all information that it cannot verify. WikiLeaks rejects submissions that have already been published elsewhere". News outlets had reported on contents of the leaks in 2014, amounting to less than half of the data that was allegedly made available to WikiLeaks in the summer of 2016.

In September 2018, The Guardian reported that Russian diplomats had secret talks with people close to Julian Assange in 2017 with plans to help him flee the UK. Several possible destinations were suggested, including Russia. The Russian embassy denied the report. It was also reported that Ecuador attempted to give Assange a diplomatic posting in Russia, but Britain refused to give him diplomatic immunity to leave the embassy. In October 2018, this was confirmed by documents released by Ecuador.

=== Allegations of anti-semitism ===
WikiLeaks has been accused of anti-semitism both in its Twitter activity and hiring decisions. According to Ian Hislop, Assange claimed that a "Jewish conspiracy" was attempting to discredit the organisation. Assange said "Hislop has distorted, invented or misremembered almost every significant claim and phrase. ... In particular, "'Jewish conspiracy' is completely false, in spirit and in word. It is serious and upsetting".

=== Exaggerated and misleading descriptions of the contents of leaks ===
WikiLeaks has been criticised for making misleading claims about the contents of its leaks. According to University of North Carolina Professor Zeynep Tufekci, this is part of a pattern of behaviour. According to Tufekci, there are three steps to WikiLeaks' "disinformation campaigns": "The first step is to dump many documents at once — rather than allowing journalists to scrutinise them and absorb their significance before publication. The second step is to sensationalise the material with misleading news releases and tweets. The third step is to sit back and watch as the news media unwittingly promotes the WikiLeaks agenda under the auspices of independent reporting."

Responding to the Stratfor email leak, Max Fisher, the associate director of The Atlantic, argued that Stratfor has a poor reputation and that as a result Anonymous and Wikileaks have exaggerated the significance of the information they released. He also suggested that Assange may have targeted a relatively unimportant firm and over-hyped the results in order to "regain some of his former glory". Daniel W. Drezner, a professor of international politics at the Fletcher School at Tufts University, wrote in Foreign Policy that the "docu-dump says more about Wikileaks and Anonymous than it does about anything else" and criticized the hype of the release.

WikiLeaks was criticised for misleading descriptions about AKP emails it said were from Turkey's ruling political party when journalists reported they were mostly newsletters and spam. Most experts and commentators agree that Phineas Fisher was behind the AKP email leak. Fisher said WikiLeaks had told her that the emails were "all spam and crap" but published them anyway despite being asked not to.

In 2017, The Intercept criticised WikiLeaks for some of its claims about Vault 7 and supply chain attacks. According to The Intercept, "WikiLeaks is stretching the facts beyond what it has published" and "the documents provided here are deeply interesting, but not worth the concern WikiLeaks generated by its public comments."

=== Buying and selling leaks ===
In 2008, WikiLeaks was criticised by University of Minnesota media ethics professor Jane Kirtley.

in 2012, Wikileaks was criticised by supporters including Anonymous for putting the Global Intelligence files behind a paywall.

In 2018, WikiLeaks was criticised for offering a reward for confidential information about "the alleged chemical attack in Douma, Syria" and publishing documents hacked from the UN body investigating the attack.

=== Inadequate curation and violations of personal privacy ===
WikiLeaks has drawn criticism for violating the personal privacy of individuals and inadequately curating its content. These critics include transparency advocates, such as Edward Snowden, Glenn Greenwald, Amnesty International, Reporters Without Borders, the Sunlight Foundation and the Federation of American Scientists.

In response to a question in 2010 about whether WikiLeaks would release information that he knew might get someone killed, Assange said that he had instituted a "harm-minimization policy". This policy meant that people named in some documents might be contacted before publication to warn them, but that there were also times were members of WikiLeaks might have "blood on our hands". One member of WikiLeaks told The New Yorker they were initially uncomfortable with Assange's editorial policy, but changed her mind because she thought no one had been unjustly harmed.

When asked to join their initial advisory board, Steven Aftergood of the Federation of American Scientists declined and told TIME that "they have a very idealistic view of the nature of leaking and its impact. They seem to think that most leakers are crusading do-gooders who are single-handedly battling one evil empire or another." Aftergood has opined that WikiLeaks "does not respect the rule of law nor does it honor the rights of individuals". Aftergood went on to state that WikiLeaks engages in unrestrained disclosure of non-governmental secrets without compelling public policy reasons and that many anti-corruption activists were opposed to the site's activities.

In 2010, Amnesty International, the International Crisis Group and several other human rights groups wrote to WikiLeaks asking it to do a better job of redacting names from the Afghan war files, in order to protect them from repercussions. Julian Assange responded by offering Amnesty International the opportunity to assist in the tedious document vetting process. When Amnesty International appeared to express reservations in accepting the offer, Assange stated that he had "no time to deal with people who prefer to do nothing but cover their asses".

In an August 2010 open letter, the non-governmental organisation Reporters Without Borders praised WikiLeaks' past usefulness in exposing "serious violations of human rights and civil liberties" but criticised the group over a perceived absence of editorial control, stating "Journalistic work involves the selection of information. The argument with which you defend yourself, namely that WikiLeaks is not made up of journalists, is not convincing."

WikiLeaks has published individuals' Social Security numbers, medical information, and credit card numbers. An analysis by the Associated Press found that WikiLeaks had in one of its mass-disclosures published "the personal information of hundreds of people – including sick children, rape victims and mental health patients". WikiLeaks has named teenage rape victims, and outed an individual arrested for homosexuality in Saudi Arabia. Some of WikiLeaks' cables "described patients with psychiatric conditions, seriously ill children or refugees". An analysis of WikiLeaks' Saudi cables "turned up more than 500 passport, identity, academic or employment files ... three dozen records pertaining to family issues in the cables – including messages about marriages, divorces, missing children, elopements and custody battles. Many are very personal, like the marital certificates that proclaims whether the bride was a virgin. Others deal with Saudis who are deeply in debt, including one man who says his wife stole his money. One divorce document details a male partner's infertility. Others identify the partners of women suffering from sexually transmitted diseases including HIV and Hepatitis C." Two individuals named in the DNC leaks were targeted by identity thieves following WikiLeaks' release of their Social Security and credit card information. In its leak of DNC e-mails, WikiLeaks revealed the details of an ordinary staffer's suicide attempt and brought attention to it through a tweet.

WikiLeaks' publishing of Sony's hacked e-mails drew criticism for violating the privacy of Sony's employees and for failing to be in the public interest. Michael A. Cohen, a fellow at the Century Foundation, argues that "data dumps like these represent a threat to our already shrinking zone of privacy". He noted that the willingness of WikiLeaks to publish information of this type encourages hacking and cyber theft: "With ready and willing amplifiers, what's to deter the next cyberthief from stealing a company's database of information and threatening to send it to Wikileaks if a list of demands aren't met?"

The Sunlight Foundation, a nonprofit that advocates for open government, has criticised WikiLeaks for inadequate curation of its content and for "weaponised transparency", writing that with the DNC leaks, "Wikileaks again failed the due diligence review we expect of putatively journalistic entities when it published the personal information of ordinary citizens, including passport and Social Security numbers contained in the hacked emails of Democratic National Committee staff. We are not alone in raising ethical questions about Wikileaks' shift from whistleblower to platform for weaponised transparency. Any organisation that 'doxxes' a public is harming privacy." The manner in which WikiLeaks publishes content can have the effect of censoring political enemies: "Wikileaks' indiscriminate disclosure in this case is perhaps the closest we've seen in reality to the bogeyman projected by enemies to reform — that transparency is just a Trojan Horse for chilling speech and silencing political enemies."

In July 2016, Edward Snowden criticised WikiLeaks for insufficiently curating its content. When Snowden made data public, he did so by working with The Washington Post, the Guardian and other news organisations, choosing only to make documents public which exposed National Security Agency surveillance programs. Content that compromised national security or exposed sensitive personal information was withheld. WikiLeaks, on the other hand, made little effort to do either, Snowden said. WikiLeaks responded by accusing Snowden of pandering to Democratic presidential nominee Hillary Clinton. At the same time, Glenn Greenwald criticised WikiLeaks for refusing to redact, telling Slate "I definitely do not agree with that approach and think that they can be harmful to innocent people or other individuals in ways that I don't think is acceptable."

In January 2017, the WikiLeaks Task Force, a Twitter account associated with WikiLeaks, proposed the creation of a database to track verified Twitter users, including sensitive personal information on individuals' homes, families and finances. According to the Chicago Tribune, "the proposal faced a sharp and swift backlash as technologists, journalists and security researchers slammed the idea as a 'sinister' and dangerous abuse of power and privacy."

== Actions by Wikileaks against the media ==
=== 2011 ===
In 2011, WikiLeaks gave The Guardian access to part of the diplomatic cables database with an agreement that the newspaper would not publish any details until Assange gave his agreement. The Guardian later received the same database from another source and decided to publish without Assange's agreement. According to Vanity Fair, when Assange discovered this he threatened to sue The Guardian, arguing "that he owned the information and had a financial interest in how and when it was released". Wikileaks and The Guardian eventually came to a new agreement and The Guardian published the material after an agreed delay.

=== 2012 ===
In 2012, Julian Assange threatened legal action against the South by Southwest (SXSW) festival if they broadcast the documentary WikiLeaks: Secrets and Lies.

=== 2016 ===
According to The Daily Dot, in 2016, WikiLeaks threatened to retaliate against its reporters if they pursued a story about Wikileaks removing correspondence about the transfer of more than €2 billion from the Central Bank of Syria to Russia's VTB Bank. The Daily Dot wrote that WikiLeaks had told them the story was "speculation and it is false" and that, if they pursued the story, "you can be sure we will return the favour one day".

=== 2017 ===
In 2017, WikiLeaks threatened to sue CNN after a commentator called Assange a "pedophile who lives in the Ecuadorian embassy in London." CNN deleted the clips and tweeted a correction, "An analyst on our air earlier today asserted that Julian Assange was a pedophile, and regrets saying it. In fact, CNN has no evidence to support that assertion. We regret the error."

=== 2018 ===
In November 2018, WikiLeaks announced it was going to sue The Guardian for libel over a November 2018 report that Paul Manafort had held secret talks with Julian Assange during the 2016 U.S. presidential election. In April 2019, WikiLeaks announced that after raising a $50,000 legal fund it would begin legal action.

=== 2019 ===
In January 2019, WikiLeaks sent journalists a "confidential legal communication not for publication" with a list of 140 things not to say about Julian Assange that WikiLeaks said were "false and defamatory". The list included that it was false and defamatory to suggest that Assange smelled, bleached his hair, tortured animals, or ever lived in a basement, cupboard or under the stairs. Soon after the list leaked online, WikiLeaks posted a heavily edited version of it. The group was criticised and mocked for the list and their handling of it.
