= Uptake =

Uptake may refer to:

- Uptake (business), a predictive analytics company based in Chicago, Illinois
- The UpTake, a Minnesota-based citizen journalist organization
- Diffusion (business), the acceptance or adoption of a new product or idea
- Absorption, especially of food or nutrient by an organism. (see digestion)
  - Mineral uptake, by plants
- Neurotransmitter uptake carriers, a class of membrane transport proteins that pump neurotransmitters from the extracellular space into the cell
