= Freedom of the Press Foundation =

Non-profit organization

- Abbreviation: FPF
- Formation: December 17, 2012; 13 years ago
- Type: Non-governmental organization
- Purpose: Freedom of the press and Freedom of speech funding
- Region served: Global
- Key people: John Perry Barlow; Daniel Ellsberg; Trevor Timm; Rainey Reitman; Edward Snowden
- Affiliations: Electronic Frontier Foundation
- Revenue: $5.2 million (2024)
- Expenses: $7.2 million (2024)
- Website: freedom.press

Freedom of the Press Foundation (FPF) is an American non-profit organization founded in 2012 to fund and support free speech and freedom of the press. The organization originally managed crowd-funding campaigns for independent journalistic organizations, but now pursues technical projects to support journalists' digital security and conducts legal advocacy for journalists.

The FPF's SecureDrop platform facilitates confidential and secure communication between journalists and their sources, many of whom are whistleblowers. It has been adopted by more than 65 news organizations globally. It also manages the U.S. Press Freedom Tracker, a database of press freedom violations in the United States, and Dangerzone, which is a tool to more securely save and open pdfs.

NSA whistleblower Edward Snowden joined FPF's board of directors in 2014 and began serving as its president in early 2016. Rainey Reitman became Board President in late 2022 and remains in the position.

== Crowdfunding ==
The organization's founding was inspired by the WikiLeaks financial blockade. In late 2012, FPF's launch re-enabled donations to WikiLeaks via Visa, MasterCard, and PayPal, after the payment processors cut off WikiLeaks in late 2010. In December 2017, after five years of processing donations on behalf of WikiLeaks, FPF's board unanimously found that the blockade was no longer in effect, and severed ties with WikiLeaks as of January 8, 2018.

FPF has also crowd-funded support for a variety of other transparency journalism organizations, as well as encryption tools used by journalists, including: WikiLeaks, MuckRock, the National Security Archive, The UpTake, The Bureau of Investigative Journalism, the Center for Public Integrity, Truthout, the LEAP Encryption Access Project, Open Whisper Systems, Tails, and the Tor Project.

In May 2013, FPF raised over $100,000 in online donations to hire a professional court stenographer to take transcripts during the trial of whistleblower Chelsea Manning after the government refused to make its transcripts available to the public. They posted the transcripts online at the end of each day of the trial for members of the media to use in their reports. Secrecy expert Steven Aftergood later called the crowd-funding effort "unprecedented", saying "it eloquently demonstrated public expectations of openness...the court and the prosecutors may have been shamed into reconsidering their habitual secrecy."

In October 2014, FPF raised over $28,000 for New Zealand independent journalist Nicky Hager to fund his legal challenge against the government of New Zealand after his house was raided by police. The raid reportedly was an attempt to uncover one or more of Hager's anonymous sources used in his book Dirty Politics. A court later ruled the raid of Hager's house was illegal.

In 2015, FPF raised more than $125,000 in online donations for Chelsea Manning's legal defense stemming from her conviction under the Espionage Act for leaking information to WikiLeaks. Notwithstanding the January 2017 commutation of her sentence and May 2017 release from prison, Manning's military appeal is ongoing.

As of June 2018, FPF accepts donations with crypto-currencies. On April 16, 2021, Edward Snowden raised 2,224 ETH (around $5.4 million) to benefit Freedom of the Press Foundation through the sale of an NFT on foundation.app. This signed work, titled "Stay Free", combines the entirety of a landmark court decision ruling the National Security Agency's mass surveillance violated the law, with the portrait of the whistleblower by Platon. This is the largest donation in the history of the organization.

In 2024 IRS filings, FPF reported $5.25 million in income, expenditures of $7.22 million and net assets of $20.7 million.

== Technical projects ==
In October 2013, FPF took over the development of SecureDrop, a free software whistleblower submission system developed in part by the late programmer and transparency activist Aaron Swartz. Swartz developed SecureDrop with Kevin Poulsen and James Dolan. Dolan moved it to FPF upon the death of Swartz. The SecureDrop system facilitates anonymous communication between two parties using the Tor Network, and allows whistleblowers to contact journalists without ever exchanging one another's identities or contact information.

The system is now in use at more than 65 news organizations, including The New York Times, The Washington Post, The Guardian, ProPublica, HuffPost, NBC News, and The Intercept. According to a study done by the Columbia Journalism School, it has since successfully led to the publication of many stories at the news organizations that use it.

FPF also teaches journalists how to use other encryption methods and digital security tools to better protect their sources.

In collaboration with The Guardian Project, FPF released a free and open-source mobile app named Haven in 2017. Haven turns an Android device into a security sensor and, optionally, alerts the device owner to activity occurring in its vicinity.

In 2022, FPF took over the development of Dangerzone, a free software tool that converts potentially harmful documents like PDFs into safe versions.

== Legal activism ==
Freedom of the Press Foundation has been involved in several Freedom of Information Act cases surrounding journalists' rights and government transparency.

In January 2016, FPF's lawsuit against the Justice Department revealed that the US government has secret rules for targeting journalists with National Security Letters (NSLs) and FISA court orders.

In March 2016, another FPF lawsuit showed that the Obama administration secretly lobbied against bipartisan Freedom of Information Act reform in Congress, despite the bill being based word-for-word on the Obama administration's supposed transparency guidelines.

In August 2026, FPF and The Intercept filed a lawsuit against president Donald Trump over Truth API, a $100,000 per month service that provides faster access to Truth Social posts from Trump. The lawsuit called the service "extraordinary, corrupt, and unconstitutional."

== Awards ==
FPF co-founders Daniel Ellsberg, John Perry Barlow, Trevor Timm, and Rainey Reitman won the 2013 Hugh Hefner First Amendment award for their role in founding FPF. The organization was the recipient of the Society of Professional Journalists' James Madison award in 2016.

== See also ==
- Committee to Protect Journalists
- Citizen journalism
- Electronic Frontier Foundation
- Journalism ethics and standards
- Open Technology Fund
- Reporters Without Borders
