= Kingpin (book) =

2011 book by Kevin Poulsen

Kingpin: How One Hacker Took Over the Billion-Dollar Cybercrime Underground
- Author: Kevin Poulsen
- Language: English
- Genre: True crime
- Published: 2011
- Publisher: Crown Publishing Group
- Publication place: United States
- ISBN: 978-0-307-58868-5

Kingpin: How One Hacker Took Over the Billion-Dollar Cybercrime Underground is a 2011 non-fiction book written by Kevin Poulsen.

== Synopsis ==
Poulsen tells the story of real life computer hacker Max Butler, who, under the alias Iceman, stole access to 1.8 million credit card accounts. The book follows Butler's path from work as a security consultant and FBI informant, through his hostile takeover of rival carding forums under the banner of his own site Carders Market, to his arrest in 2007 and a then-record 13-year federal prison sentence. Along the way, Poulsen, himself a former hacker and a Wired editor, describes the mechanics of the underground carding economy, including phishing, identity theft and payment card counterfeiting.

== Reception ==
Reviewing the book for The New York Times, Bryan Burrough called it "a fast, entertaining tale" written in "lean, no-nonsense prose", while noting that its protagonist lacks the depth of the best hacker narratives. In the San Francisco Chronicle, G. Pascal Zachary praised Poulsen's reporting and brisk style but criticized recurring exaggerations in the portrayal of the scale of the crimes. The book was later inducted into the Cybersecurity Canon, a practitioner-curated list of essential books about computer security.

A Polish translation by Tomasz Macios was published in 2011 by Znak under the title Haker. Prawdziwa historia szefa cybermafii.
