= John McClurg =

American counterintelligence chief

John E. McClurg
- Education: Brigham Young University; UNC-Chapel Hill; UCLA
- Employer: BlackBerry|Cylance
- Title: Chief Security Officer

John E. McClurg is an American security and counterintelligence professional. He spent his early career with the US government, serving as both a supervisory special agent and branch chief for the FBI as well as a deputy branch chief for the CIA. In these roles, McClurg was involved in the capturing of both Kevin Poulsen and Harold James Nicholson. Following his public service, he has served as a vice-president and Chief Security Officer for Lucent, Honeywell, Dell, and BlackBerry|Cylance.

== Education ==
John McClurg received his JD from Brigham Young University and became licensed to practice law through the Utah Bar Association. At Brigham Young he also earned a BA, BSc, and MA in Organizational Behavior, and he later pursued doctoral studies in Hermeneutics at the UNC-Chapel Hill and UCLA.

== FBI and CIA career ==
McClurg began his career working in the intelligence community, working for the FBI, where he co-created what became the National Infrastructure Protection Center at the Department of Homeland Security. At the FBI McClurg was a supervisory special agent and served on one of the US's first Joint Terrorism Task Forces. One of his tasks while working as a special agent in Los Angeles was to bring down hacker Kevin Poulsen, also known as "Dark Dante". As a result of that effort McClurg developed techniques for combatting converged security risks that integrate both physical and cyber threats. This led to McClurg's development of the "Converged Risk Assessment Model" of cyber/physical security. McClurg was involved in the capture and prosecution of Poulsen, and was also responsible for efforts that resulted in the capture of CIA double agent Harold James Nicholson. He was also involved in real-world security operations against Mexican drug cartels and other organized criminals.

McClurg also served as a cybersecurity branch chief who developed the cyber-counterintelligence program for the U.S. Department of Energy's newly founded Office of Counterintelligence. He was also a deputy branch chief for the CIA, helping to establish the CIA's Counter-espionage Group. In the mid-2000s, after entering the corporate world, McClurg co-chaired the Overseas Security Advisory Council of the U.S. State Department and was a member of the FBI's Domestic Security Alliance Council.

== Business career ==
McClurg served as the vice president for security at Lucent Technologies/Bell Laboratories in the mid-2000s. He later became the vice president and chief security officer of Global Security at Honeywell, where he developed strategic focus and tactical operations for cyber and physical security. He was also working on an early Advanced Persistent Threat program, before moving to Dell Inc in 2011, where he became the vice president and chief security officer of Dell's Global Security Organization. At Dell he developed what he called the Business Assurance Program, which was designed to determine the likelihood of a trusted insider employee or worker of acting against their interests—such as engaging in spying.

== Writing ==
John McClurg has contributed to publications including Security Magazine and Information Week. He has also served as a keynote speaker on security issues at industry conferences.

== Recognition ==
In 2008 McClurg was named a Compass Award winner for leadership in the security industry by Chief Security Officer Magazine, and he has been named to the "25 Most Influential in the Security Industry" list for Security Magazine. He was also twice decorated for his work with the FBI.
