= James Dolan (computer security expert) =

American computer security expert, co-developed SecureDrop (1981-2017)

- Born: July 20, 1981
- Died: December 27, 2017 (aged 36); Brooklyn, New York, U.S.
- Other names: James S. Dolan dolanjs
- Occupation: Computer security expert
- Years active: 1999–2017
- Organization: Freedom of the Press Foundation
- Known for: Co-developer of SecureDrop

James S. Dolan (July 20, 1981 – December 27, 2017) was an American computer security expert who, with Aaron Swartz and Kevin Poulsen, co-developed SecureDrop, a widely used secure digital platform for sources to anonymously submit materials to journalists.

== Early life ==
Dolan grew up in Chester, New York. He was raised with four sisters. He attended the Tuxedo Park School and was considered gifted at an early age. Later, he moved to Brooklyn and also had returned to Chester.

== Career ==
From 1999 to 2006, Dolan served with the Marines in two deployments during the Iraq War where he worked as a data network specialist. In 2003, Dolan served with III Marine Expeditionary Force during the initial Iraq War. In his second deployment, which was from September 2004 to March 2005, Dolan served with 4th Civil Affairs Group in Fallujah, which was one of the centers of the conflict at that time. Dolan was in Fallujah during Operation Phantom Fury, part of the Second Battle of Fallujah.

Trevor Timm from the Freedom of the Press Foundation referenced Dolan's military service in his description of Dolan in the obituary he wrote, saying that the impact of serving in Iraq was an often spoke of motivating factor for Dolan's cybersecurity work, with the goal of making metadata "transparent and accountable."

After his service in the Iraq War, Dolan worked in computer security at a large IT company.

In 2012, as a side project to his IT job, Dolan helped develop the open source SecureDrop, initially known as DeadDrop. In 2013, Poulsen and Dolan moved it to the Freedom of the Press Foundation to ensure its continued development and adoption following the death of fellow developer Aaron Swartz. Dolan was the lead maintainer for DeadDrop, and as the Freedom of the Press Foundation's first employee, performed outreach and assisted in installations for news organizations that included The New Yorker, ProPublica, The Washington Post,, The New York Times, The Wall Street Journal, and VICE News, among dozens of others.

In 2015, Dolan moved to San Diego, California, to work as head of security at Classy, an American software company and an online fundraising platform designed for nonprofit organizations, a position he held at the time of his death.

== Death ==
Dolan was found dead in a Brooklyn hotel in December 2017 at the age of 36. Former colleagues speculate James died of suicide (the same as Swartz). He reportedly had developed PTSD from his time in the Marines. Dolan was the second member of the SecureDrop team to die by suicide. A GoFundMe fund was set up by his fellow Marines to establish the James Dolan Memorial Fund, which will annually donate to designated non-profit foundations and projects in his name.
