= SecureDrop =

Free software platform

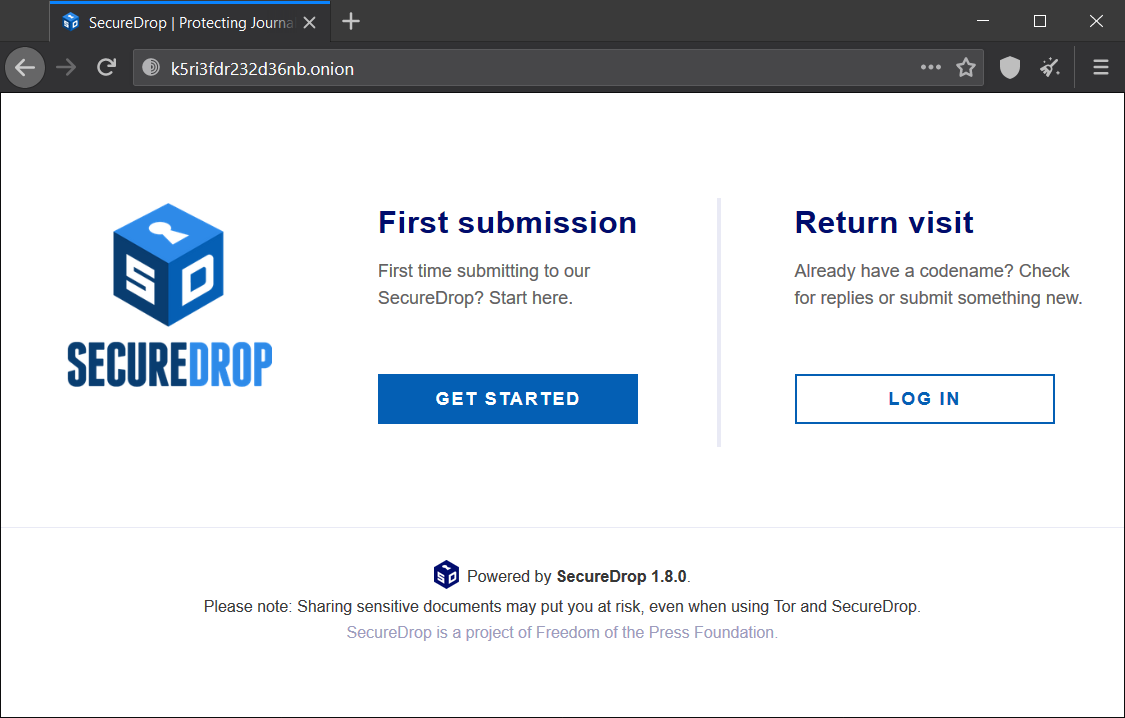
- Screenshot from the SecureDrop Source interface.
- Original authors: James Dolan; Kevin Poulsen; Aaron Swartz
- Developer: Freedom of the Press Foundation
- Release: 15 October 2013; 13 years ago
- Stable release: 2.16.2 (29 October 2026; 21 days ago)
- Written in: Python
- Operating system: Linux
- Type: Secure communication
- License: GNU Affero General Public License, version 3
- Website: securedrop.org; sdolvtfhatvsysc6l34d65ymdwxcujausv7k5jk4cy5ttzhjoi6fzvyd.onion ^{(Accessing link help)}
- Repository: github.com/freedomofpress/securedrop

SecureDrop is a free software platform for secure communication between journalists and sources (whistleblowers). It was originally designed and developed by Aaron Swartz and Kevin Poulsen under the name DeadDrop. James Dolan also co-created the software.

== History ==
After Aaron Swartz's death, the first instance of the platform was launched under the name Strongbox by staff at The New Yorker on 15 May 2013. The Freedom of the Press Foundation took over development of DeadDrop under the name SecureDrop, and has since assisted with its installation at several news organizations, including ProPublica, The Guardian, The Intercept, and The Washington Post.

== Security ==
SecureDrop uses the anonymity network Tor to facilitate communication between whistleblowers, journalists, and news organizations. SecureDrop sites are therefore only accessible as onion services in the Tor network. After a user visits a SecureDrop website, they are given a randomly generated code name. This code name is used to send information to a particular author or editor via uploading. Investigative journalists can contact the whistleblower via SecureDrop messaging. Therefore, the whistleblower must take note of their random code name.

The system utilizes private, segregated servers that are in the possession of the news organization. Journalists use two USB flash drives and two personal computers to access SecureDrop data. The first personal computer accesses SecureDrop via the Tor network, and the journalist uses the first flash drive to download encrypted data from the SecureDrop server. The second personal computer does not connect to the Internet, and is wiped during each reboot. The second flash drive contains a decryption code. The first and second flash drives are inserted into the second personal computer, and the material becomes available to the journalist. The personal computer is shut down after each use.

Freedom of the Press Foundation has stated it will have the SecureDrop code and security environment audited by an independent third party before every major version release and then publish the results. The first audit was conducted by security researchers at the University of Washington and Bruce Schneier. The second audit was conducted by Cure53, a German security firm.

In 2024, SecureDrop completed its sixth security audit, conducted by 7ASecurity. The audit identified three vulnerabilities, including one medium-severity and two low-severity findings. These vulnerabilities were fixed in SecureDrop version 2.10.0.

SecureDrop suggests sources disabling JavaScript to protect anonymity.

== Prominent organizations using SecureDrop ==
The Freedom of the Press Foundation now maintains an official directory of SecureDrop instances. This is a partial list of instances at prominent news organizations.

Name of organization	Implementation date
The New Yorker	15 May 2013
Forbes	29 Oct 2013
Bivol	30 Oct 2013
ProPublica	27 Jan 2014
The Intercept	10 Feb 2014
San Francisco Bay Guardian	18 Feb 2014
The Washington Post	5 Jun 2014
The Guardian	6 Jun 2014
The Globe and Mail	4 Mar 2015
Radio-Canada	20 Jan 2016
Canadian Broadcasting Corporation	29 Jan 2016
Committee to Protect Journalists	12 May 2016
Associated Press	18 Oct 2016
The New York Times	15 Dec 2016
BuzzFeed News	21 Dec 2016
USA Today	22 Feb 2017
Bloomberg News	Unknown
The Wall Street Journal	Unknown
Aftenposten	Unknown
Australian Broadcasting Corporation	28 Nov 2019
Mediapart	Unknown

== Awards ==
- 2016: Free Software Foundation, Free Software Award, Award for Projects of Social Benefit

== See also ==
- GlobaLeaks
- WikiLeaks
