= Kevin Poulsen =

American computer hacker (born 1965)

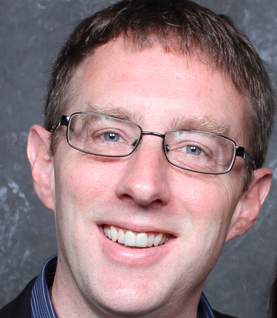
- Poulsen in 2014
- Born: Kevin Lee Poulsen; November 30, 1965 (age 60); Pasadena, California, U.S.
- Other name: Dark Dante
- Occupation: Contributing editor at The Daily Beast
- Children: 2
- Criminal information
- Status: released
- Convictions: seven counts of conspiracy, fraud, and intercepting wire communications
- Penalty: 51 months in federal prison, banned from using computers without permission from his probation officer

Kevin Lee Poulsen (born November 30, 1965) is an American contributing editor at The Daily Beast, a former black-hat hacker, and convicted fraudster.

== Biography ==
He was born in Pasadena, California, on November 30, 1965.

On June 1, 1990, Poulsen took over all of the telephone lines for Los Angeles radio station KIIS-FM, guaranteeing that he would be the 102nd caller and win the prize of a Porsche 944 S2.

When the Federal Bureau of Investigation started pursuing Poulsen, he went underground as a fugitive. A storage company cleared out a storage shed in Poulsen's name due to non-payment of rent, where computer equipment was discovered which was furnished to the FBI for evidence. When he was featured on NBC's Unsolved Mysteries, the show's 1-800 telephone lines mysteriously crashed. Poulsen was arrested in April 1991 following an investigation led in part by John McClurg.

In June 1994, Poulsen pleaded guilty to seven counts of conspiracy, fraud, and wiretapping. He was sentenced to five years in a federal penitentiary and banned from using computers or the internet for three years after his release. He was the first American to be released from prison with a court sentence that banned him from using computers and the internet after his prison sentence. Although Chris Lamprecht was sentenced first with an internet ban on May 5, 1995, Poulsen was released from prison before Lamprecht and began serving his ban sentence earlier. (Poulsen's parole officer later allowed him to use the Internet in 2004, with certain monitoring restrictions).

=== Journalism ===
Poulsen reinvented himself as a journalist after his release from prison and sought to distance himself from his criminal past. Poulsen served in a number of journalistic capacities at California-based security research firm SecurityFocus, where he began writing security and hacking news in early 2000. Despite a late arrival to a market saturated with technology media, SecurityFocus News became a well-known name in the tech news world during Poulsen's tenure with the company and was acquired by Symantec. Moreover, his original investigative reporting was frequently picked up by the mainstream press. Poulsen left SecurityFocus in 2005 to freelance and pursue independent writing projects. In June 2005, he became a senior editor for Wired News, which hosted his blog, 27BStroke6, later renamed Threat Level.

In October 2006, Poulsen released information detailing his successful search for registered sex offenders using MySpace to solicit sex from children. His work identified 744 registered people with MySpace profiles and led to the arrest of one, Andrew Lubrano.

In June 2010, Poulsen broke the initial story of the arrest of U.S. service member Chelsea Manning and published the logs of Manning's chats with Adrian Lamo regarding WikiLeaks.

In June 2019, Poulsen was accused of doxing Shawn Brooks, a 34-year-old Trump supporter living in The Bronx, when Poulsen revealed Brooks' identity in an article published in The Daily Beast on June 1, 2019 as the alleged creator and disseminator of a fake video which showed Nancy Pelosi speaking in a slurred manner.

=== SecureDrop ===
Poulsen, Aaron Swartz, and James Dolan designed and developed SecureDrop, an open-source software platform for secure communication between journalists and sources. It was originally developed under the name DeadDrop. After Swartz's death Poulsen launched the first instance of the platform at The New Yorker, on May 15, 2013. Poulsen later turned over development of SecureDrop to the Freedom of the Press Foundation, and joined the foundation's technical advisory board.

== Personal life ==
Kevin Poulsen lives in San Francisco with his wife and two children.

== Awards ==
- 2011 Webby Award (International Academy of Digital Arts and Sciences), Law category, for Threat Level
- 2011 Webby Award (International Academy of Digital Arts and Sciences), People's Voice award, Law category, for Threat Level
- 2010 SANS Top Cyber Security Journalists (SANS Institute)
- 2010, MIN Best of the Web (Magazine Industry Newsletter), Best Blog, for Threat Level
- 2009, MIN Digital Hall of Fame (Magazine Industry Newsletter) Inductee
- 2008, Knight-Batten Award for Innovation in Journalism (J-Lab) Grand Prize
- 2007, Knight-Batten Award for Innovation in Journalism (J-Lab) Grand Prize

== Books ==
- Poulsen, Kevin (2011). Kingpin: How One Hacker Took Over the Billion-Dollar Cybercrime Underground. Crown. ISBN 978-0-307-58868-5.

== See also ==
- DEF CON
- Kevin Mitnick
- List of computer criminals
- The Secret History of Hacking, a 2001 documentary film featuring Kevin Mitnick
