= The UpTake =

- Website type: News
- Available in: English
- Owner: Independent
- Website: theuptake.org
- Commercial: No, 501(c) Nonprofit
- Launched: 2007
- Current status: Online

The UpTake is a Minnesota-based citizen journalist organization. It was founded in July 2007 and has provided online news coverage on a low budget since.

Because of its role as a provider of citizen journalism, the UpTake is a not-for-profit organization. As such, many of its journalists have to rely on technology, such as cell phone cameras, technically outclassed by professional equipment. This financial disadvantage has spurred the UpTake to develop innovative methods of low-cost information gathering and reporting, such as live broadcasting from cell phone camera feeds.

== 2008 Minnesota Senate election ==
The UpTake's profile increased dramatically during the disputed 2008 U.S. Senate election in Minnesota, the home state of the UpTake. The UpTake provided full coverage of the recount process, winning accolades and citations from fellow news blogs FiveThirtyEight.com and MinnPost.com and local Minnesota news outlets such as the Minnesota Independent. On January 5, 2009, when the final batch of absentee ballots in the recount were opened, checked, sorted, and counted, The UpTake broadcast the entire process live via streaming video on TheUpTake.org. Its initial count for Minnesota Democratic-Farmer-Labor Party candidate Al Franken's lead after the absentee ballots were sorted aloud was 223; the number appeared on breaking reports on other websites, including FiveThirtyEight.com, until an election official announced that Franken's unofficial lead was actually 225.

== Recognition ==
The Center for Public Integrity listed the UpTake as one of its "Top Ten Websites from 2008". In a tongue-in-cheek reference to an infamous ballot challenge by Republican candidate Norm Coleman's campaign, the list identified the UpTake as:

A nonprofit journalism site that has kept political junkies across the world abreast of every minute of the five-person Minnesota recount committee’s deliberations about Franken, Coleman, and Lizard People.

On January 18, 2011, the UpTake announced it had become the first online-only news organization to get a seat in the Minnesota Capitol press room.

== See also ==
- Freedom of the Press Foundation
