= Contents of the United States diplomatic cables leak (India) =

Content from the United States diplomatic cables leak has depicted India and related subjects extensively. The leak, which began on 28 November 2010, occurred when the website of WikiLeaks – an international new media non-profit organisation that publishes submissions of otherwise unavailable documents from anonymous news sources and news leaks – started to publish classified documents of detailed correspondence – diplomatic cables – between the United States Department of State and its diplomatic missions around the world. Since the initial release date, WikiLeaks had been releasing further documents daily.

== Domestic affairs ==
=== 1984 anti-Sikh riots ===
According to Robert O Blake, several officials in the Government of India actively and passively assisted in the 1984 anti-Sikh riots because of "opportunism and hatred"

=== Cash for votes in South India ===
Political parties regularly bribe voters, in the form of cash, goods, or services, before elections in South India. It may range from financing the construction of a community well to putting into an envelope and delivering it inside the morning newspaper. Politicians and their operatives have admitted to violating election rules to influence voters. The money used to pay for the bribes come from the money raised through fundraising. The practice is thought to have swung many elections where the race was close.

=== Biometric database ===
The U.S. State Department solicited "biographical and biometric information on key NAM/G-77/OIC Permanent Representatives, particularly India, China".

== U.S. views on Indian politicians ==
=== Rahul Gandhi ===
Various diplomatic cables from the U.S. Embassy in India show an evolving U.S. view of Rahul Gandhi. In late 2007, U.S. diplomats described him, "widely viewed as an empty suit and will have to prove wrong those who dismiss him as a lightweight. To do so he will have to demonstrate determination, depth, savvy and stamina. He will need to get his hands dirty in the untidy and ruthless business that is Indian politics." Other cables say that Gandhi was politically inexperienced, made repeated mistakes, and refer to criticisms of him by "political analysts and journalists". His relations with the U.S. improved over time. In November 2009, after a meeting with the U.S. ambassador, he has described as "an elusive contact in the past" but now "clearly interested in reaching out to the [U.S. government]". A cable from February 2010 describes him as "increasingly sure-footed".

=== Narendra Modi ===
A cable dated 2 November 2006 from Michael S. Owen, the U.S. Consul General in Mumbai, indicated that he wanted to reach out to then Gujarat Chief Minister Narendra Modi, following the U.S. denying him a visa in 2005. In his appraisal of Modi, Owen wrote, "Modi has successfully branded himself as a non-corrupt, effective administrator, as a facilitator of business in a state with a deep commercial culture, and as a no-nonsense, law-and-order politician who looks after the interests of the Hindu majority."

== Foreign relations ==
=== India-Pakistan relations ===
The U.S. conducted its own secret analysis of India's military contingency plans, which are codenamed Cold Start. India has said that if sufficiently provoked, it would mount a rapid invasion of Pakistan. The U.S. said in a cable that it highly doubted the Indian Army was capable of doing so: "It is the collective judgment of the mission that India would likely encounter very mixed results. Indian forces could have significant problems consolidating initial gains due to logistical difficulties and slow reinforcement". However, Roemer warned that for India to launch the Cold Start doctrine, would be to "roll the nuclear dice". It could trigger the world's first use of nuclear weapons since the atomic bombings of Hiroshima and Nagasaki. Indian leaders no doubt realize that, although Cold Start is designed to punish Pakistan in a limited manner without triggering a nuclear response, the Indians cannot be sure whether Pakistani leaders will in fact refrain from such a response". To counter the Indian doctrine, U.S. diplomats in Islamabad were told Pakistan was working on producing smaller, tactical nuclear weapons such as nuclear artillery that could be used on the battlefield against Indian troops.

=== India-Tibet relations ===
Shivshankar Menon, the current Indian national security advisor said, though "the Tibetan movement has the sympathy of the Indian public, and India has been a generally supportive home to tens of thousands of Tibetans, including the Dalai Lama, for nearly 50 years, the tacit agreement that Tibetans are welcome in India as long as they don't cause problems is being challenged".

=== Bahrain-India relations ===
Bahrain's King Hamad holds a positive view of India and urged the U.S. to use India's help in Afghanistan. He considers India as a positive force in the region.

=== Bid for permanent UNSC seat ===
A U.S. State Department cable called India a "self-appointed frontrunner for permanent UNSC seat". However, despite the criticisms, the U.S. remains supportive of India's bid for a seat in the U.N., along with that of Japan, Brazil and Germany.

== Terrorism ==
=== 2008 Mumbai attacks ===
The Indian National Congress (INC) tried to use the conspiracy theories behind the 2008 Mumbai attacks, targeting its main political rival, the Bharatiya Janata Party (BJP), to gain support of the Indian Muslim community for the 2009 general elections. The INC cynically pulled back from its original dismissal and lent credence to the conspiracy. The cable alleged, "The entire episode demonstrates that the Congress Party will readily stoop to the old caste/religious-based politics if it feels it is in its interest."

=== Hindu extremism ===
Rahul Gandhi, son of Sonia Gandhi and president of the Indian National Congress (INC) , in a conversation with Timothy J. Roemer, then U.S. Ambassador to India, said that he believes Hindu extremists pose a greater threat to his country than Muslim terrorists. Gandhi referred specifically to figures in the INC's main political rival, the Bharatiya Janata Party (BJP). Also responding to the ambassador's query about the activities in the region by the Pakistan-based Islamist militant organisation Lashkar-e-Taiba (LeT), Gandhi said there was evidence of some support for the group among certain elements in India's indigenous Muslim population.

=== Lashkar-e-Taiba assassination plot ===
Seven months after the 2008 Mumbai attacks, Lashkar-e-Taiba had plans to assassinate then Gujarat Chief Minister Narendra Modi.

=== Counter-terrorism coordination ===
"India's fiercely independent foreign-policy stance, its traditional go-it-alone strategy toward its security, and its domestic political sensitivities over the sentiments of its large Muslim population, have all contributed to India's caution in working with us on a joint counter-terrorism strategy. While India has been very keen to receive information and technology from us to further its counter-terrorism efforts, it provides little in return."

Acting coordinator for counter-terrorism, Frank Urbancic, described India's police and security forces as "overworked and hampered by bad police practices, including the wide-spread use of torture in interrogations, rampant corruption, poor training, and a general inability to conduct solid forensic investigations."

=== Maoist violence in India ===
The cables leaked speculate that the Naxalite–Maoist insurgency in India is not dependent on foreign support.
