= Fund for the Defense of Net Neutrality =

French free speech non-profit organisation

The Fund for Defense of Net Neutrality (French: Fonds de Défense de la Net Neutralité or FDN²) is a French-based non-profit organization that collects funds and donations for movements that promote free speech on the internet. The organization was founded in 2008, in response to the need to fund La Quadrature du Net.

== WikiLeaks involvement ==
FDN² gained world-wide attention in July 2012 after it agreed to collect donations for WikiLeaks that had been blocked by US-based financial organizations despite the absence of any legal proceedings. FDN² indicated that it would channel donations through its "Carte Bleue" venue; according to Wikileaks Visa and Mastercharge are contractually bound to work with Carte Bleue.
