= Weirdo (artist) =

American artist (born 1981)

- Born: Jeff Jacobson; 1981 (age 44–45)
- Occupation: Fine artist

Weirdo, born Jeff Jacobson, in 1981, is a Seattle-based fine artist. Well known for his street art and murals, he is also commonly associated with PT (Pure Talent), and Franklin and Thomas. Weirdo has been a professional artist since 2006 and portfolio can be found at www.weirdocult.com. His oil, mixed media paintings and sculptures have been shown at fine art establishments such as Flat Color Gallery, Upper Playground/Fifty 24SEA Gallery, Corridor Gallery, Form Space Atelier (Seattle), and Alpha Cult Gallery (LA).

Recently featured in the Chase Jarvis project titled Chase Jarvis: Seattle 100.

A 2011 interview featured on the Seattle PI online blog: Seattle P.I. Blog.
