= Violence against women =

Violent acts against women and girls

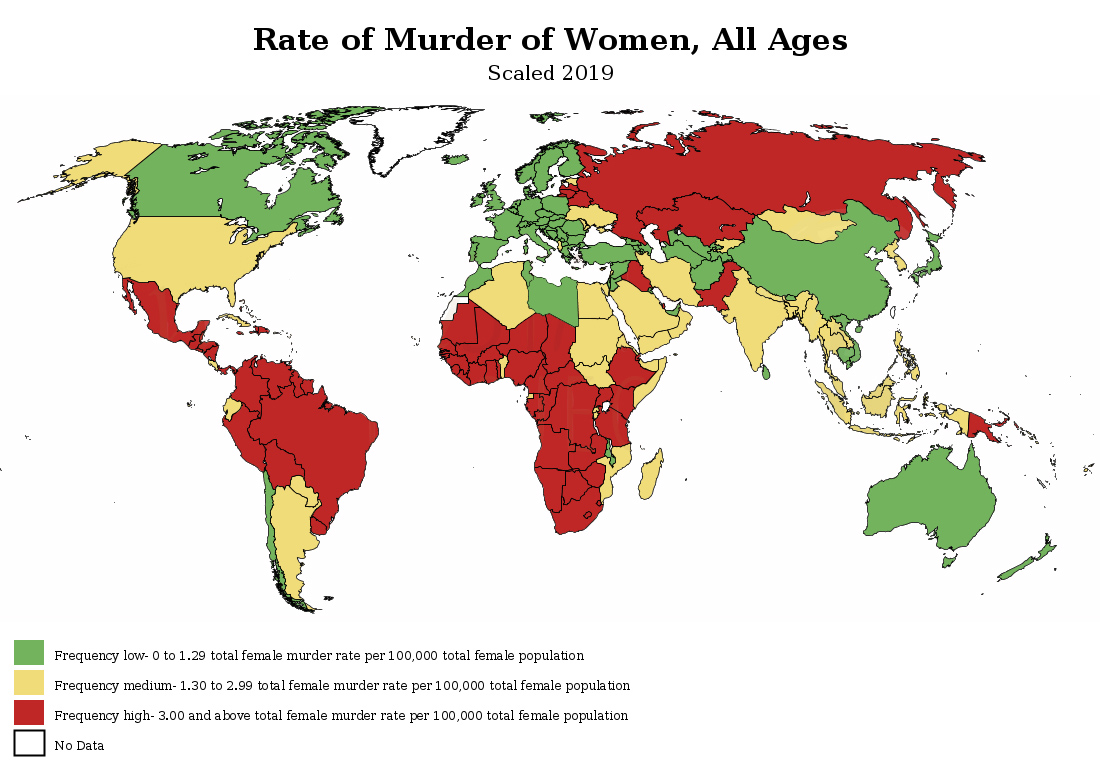
Murders per 100,000 population committed against women, 2019

Violence against women (VAW), also known as gender-based violence, violence against women and girls, or sexual and gender-based violence, is violence committed against women or girls specifically because they are female. Such violence, often considered hate crime, is primarily committed by men or boys due to historical power dynamics between the genders.

VAW has an extensive history, though the incidents and intensity of violence has varied over time and between societies. Such violence is often seen as a mechanism for the subjugation of women, whether in society in general or in an interpersonal relationship.

The UN Declaration on the Elimination of Violence Against Women states, "violence against women is a manifestation of historically unequal power relations between men and women" and "violence against women is one of the crucial social mechanisms by which women are forced into a subordinate position compared with men."

Kofi Annan, Secretary-General of the United Nations, declared in a 2006 report posted on the United Nations Development Fund for Women (UNIFEM) website:

Violence against women and girls is a problem of pandemic proportions. At least one out of every three women around the world has been beaten, coerced into sex, or otherwise abused in her lifetime with the abuser usually someone known to her.

== Definition ==
International instruments aiming to eliminate violence against women and domestic violence have been enacted by various international bodies. These generally start with a definition of gendered violence, and a proposal to combat it. The Istanbul Convention (Council of Europe Convention on preventing and combating violence against women and domestic violence) of the Council of Europe describes VAW as "a violation of human rights and a form of discrimination against women" and defines VAW as "all acts of gender-based violence that result in or are likely to result in physical, sexual, psychological, or economic harm or suffering to women, including threats of such acts, coercion, or arbitrary deprivation of liberty, whether occurring in public or in private life".

The 1979 Convention on the Elimination of All Forms of Discrimination Against Women (CEDAW) of the United Nations General Assembly makes recommendations relating to VAW, and the Vienna Declaration and Programme of Action mentions VAW. However, the 1993 United Nations General Assembly resolution on the Declaration on the Elimination of Violence Against Women was the first international instrument to explicitly define VAW and elaborate on the subject. Other definitions of VAW are set out in the 1994 Inter-American Convention on the Prevention, Punishment, and Eradication of Violence Against Women and by the 2003 Maputo Protocol.

In addition, the term gender-based violence refers to "any acts or threats of acts intended to hurt or make women suffer physically, sexually, or psychologically, and which affect women because they are women or affect women disproportionately". Gender-based violence is often used interchangeably with violence against women, and some articles on VAW reiterate these conceptions by stating that men are the main perpetrators of this violence. Moreover, the definition stated by the 1993 Declaration on the Elimination of Violence Against Women also supported the notion that violence is rooted in the inequality between men and women when the term violence is used together with the term gender-based.

In Recommendation Rec(2002)5 of the Committee of Ministers to member states on the protection of women against violence, the Council of Europe stipulated that VAW "includes, but is not limited to, the following":

a. violence occurring in the family or domestic unit, including, inter alia, physical and mental aggression, emotional and psychological abuse, rape and sexual abuse, incest, rape between spouses, regular or occasional partners and cohabitants, crimes committed in the name of honour, female genital and sexual mutilation and other traditional practices harmful to women such as forced marriages;

b. violence occurring within the general community, including, inter alia, rape, sexual abuse, sexual harassment and intimidation at work, in institutions or elsewhere; trafficking in women for the purposes of sexual exploitation, and economic exploitation and sex tourism;

c. violence perpetrated or condoned by the state or its officials;

d. violation of the human rights of women in situations of armed conflict, in particular the taking of hostages, forced displacement, systematic rape, sexual slavery, forced pregnancy, and trafficking for the purposes of sexual exploitation and economic exploitation.

These definitions of VAW as gender-based are seen by some to be unsatisfactory. These definitions understand society as patriarchal, signifying unequal relations between men and women. Opponents of such definitions argue that the definitions disregard violence against men and that the term gender, as used in gender-based violence, only refers to women. Other critics argue that employing the term gender in this particular way introduces notions of inferiority and subordination for femininity and superiority for masculinity. There is no widely accepted current definition that covers all the dimensions of gender-based violence.

Comparison of definitions in human rights instruments
Document	Adopted by	Date	Definition
General Recommendation 19	CEDAW Committee	1992	'The definition of discrimination includes gender-based violence, that is, violence that is directed against a woman because she is a woman or that affects women disproportionately.'
DEVAW	United Nations	20 December 1993	'...the term "violence against women" means any act of gender-based violence that results in, or is likely to result in, physical, sexual or psychological harm or suffering to women'.
Belém do Pará Convention	Organization of American States	9 June 1994	'...violence against women shall be understood as any act or conduct, based on gender, which causes death or physical, sexual or psychological harm or suffering to women, whether in the public or the private sphere.'
Maputo Protocol	African Union	11 July 2003	'"Violence against women" means all acts perpetrated against women which cause or could cause them physical, sexual, psychological, and economic harm, including the threat to take such acts; or to undertake the imposition of arbitrary restrictions on or deprivation of fundamental freedoms in private or public life in peace time and during situations of armed conflicts or of war...'
Istanbul Convention	Council of Europe	11 May 2011	'..."violence against women" is understood as a violation of human rights and a form of discrimination against women and shall mean all acts of gender-based violence that result in, or are likely to result in, physical, sexual, psychological or economic harm or suffering to women, including threats of such acts, coercion or arbitrary deprivation of liberty, whether occurring in public or in private life; ... "gender" shall mean the socially constructed roles, behaviours, activities and attributes that a given society considers appropriate for women and men; "gender-based violence against women" shall mean violence that is directed against a woman because she is a woman or that affects women disproportionately...'. The preamble notes: '...Recognising that women and girls are exposed to a higher risk of gender-based violence than men; Recognising that domestic violence affects women disproportionately, and that men may also be victims of domestic violence...'

=== Forms of violence ===
Violence against women fits into several broad categories. These include violence carried out by individuals and states.

Some forms of violence by individual perpetrators are: rape, domestic violence, sexual harassment, acid throwing, reproductive coercion, female infanticide, prenatal sex selection, obstetric violence, online gender-based violence and mob violence; as well as harmful customary or traditional practices such as honor killings, dowry violence, female genital mutilation, marriage by abduction and forced marriage.

Forms of violence may be perpetrated or condoned by governments, such as war rape; sexual violence and sexual slavery during conflict, forced sterilization; forced abortion; violence by police and authoritative personnel; stoning and flogging.

Many forms of VAW, such as trafficking in women and forced prostitution are often perpetrated by organized criminal networks. Historically, there have been forms of organized WAV, such as Witch trials in the early modern period or the sexual slavery of comfort women. The Gender Equality Commission of the Council of Europe identifies nine forms of violence against women based on subject and context rather than life cycle or time period:

- 'Violence within the family or domestic violence'
- 'Rape and sexual violence'
- 'Sexual harassment'
- 'Violence in institutional environments'
- 'Female genital mutilation'
- 'Forced marriages'
- 'Violence in conflict and post-conflict situations'
- 'Killings in the name of honour'
- 'Failure to respect freedom of choice with regard to reproduction'

==== By age groups ====
The World Health Organization (WHO) has developed a typology of violence against women based on their cultural life cycles.

Phase	Type of violence
Pre-birth	Sex-selective abortion; effects of battering during pregnancy on birth outcomes
Infancy	Female infanticide; physical, sexual and psychological abuse
Girlhood	Child marriage; female genital mutilation; physical, sexual and psychological abuse; incest; child prostitution and pornography
Adolescence and adulthood	Dating and courtship violence (e.g. acid throwing and date rape); economically coerced sex (e.g. school girls having sex with "sugar daddies" in return for school fees); incest; sexual abuse in the workplace; rape; sexual harassment; forced prostitution and pornography; trafficking in women; partner violence; marital rape; dowry abuse and murders; partner homicide; psychological abuse; abuse of women with disabilities; forced pregnancy
Elderly	Forced "suicide" or homicide of widows for economic reasons; sexual, physical and psychological abuse

== Sexual violence ==
Sexual harassment involves actions with unwelcome sexual overtones, including verbal transgressions. Sexual violence is a broader term referring to violence to obtain a sexual act, for example, trafficking. Sexual assault is usually defined as unwanted sexual contact and when this involves sexual penetration or sexual intercourse it is referred to as rape.

Women are most often the victims of rape, usually perpetrated by men known to them. The rates of reporting, prosecution, and convictions for rape vary considerably in different jurisdictions and are influenced by the society's attitudes toward such crimes. It is considered the most underreported violent crime. Following a rape, a victim may face violence or threats from the rapist and, in many cultures, from the victim's own family and relatives. Violence or intimidation of the victim may be perpetrated by the rapist, or by friends and relatives of the rapist, as a way of preventing the victims from reporting the rape, punishing them for reporting it, or forcing them to withdraw the complaint; or it may be perpetrated by the relatives of the victim as a punishment for "bringing shame" to the family. Internationally, the incidence of rapes recorded by police during 2008 varied between 0.1 per 100,000 people in Egypt and 91.6 per 100,000 people in Lesotho with 4.9 per 100,000 people in Lithuania as the median. Around the world, rape is often not reported or handled properly by law enforcement for a wide variety of reasons.

In 2011, the US Centers for Disease Control and Prevention (CDC) found that "nearly 20% of all women" in the United States suffered attempted rape or rape sometime in their lives. More than a third of the victims were raped before the age of 18.

=== Survival sex ===
Some women engage in sex work out of necessity to meet basic needs, such as shelter and food. This is particularly prevalent among women experiencing homelessness. Many women have said they were raped when engaging in sex work. They may be apprehensive about coming forward and reporting their attacks. When reported, many women have said that the stigma was too great, and that the police told them they deserved it and were reluctant to follow police policy. Decriminalizing sex work is argued to help sex workers in this aspect.

In some countries, it is common for older men to engage in "compensated dating" with underage girls. Such relationships are called enjo kōsai in Japan and are also common in Asian countries such as Taiwan, South Korea, and Hong Kong. The WHO condemned "economically coerced sex (e.g. school girls having sex with "sugar daddies" in return for school fees)" as a form of violence against women.

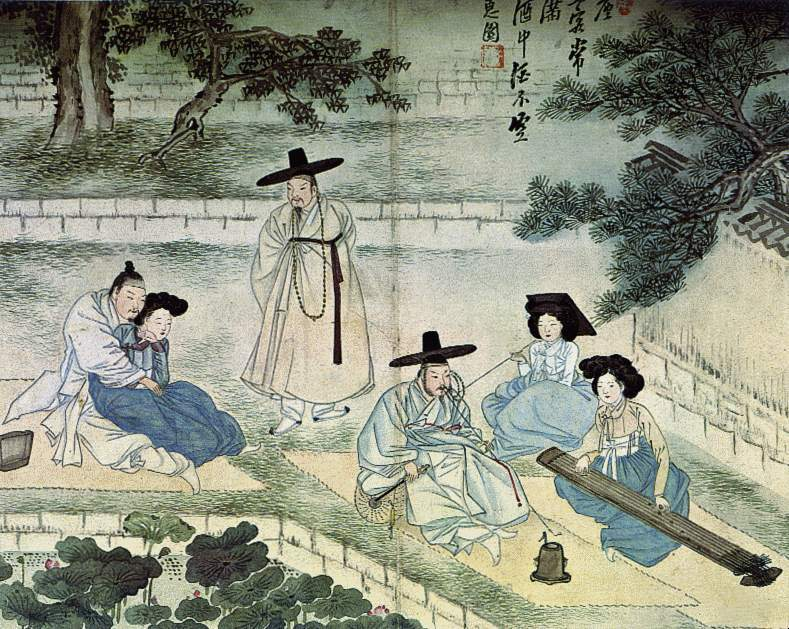
Kisaeng women from outcast or slave families.

Women from certain lower castes have been involved in prostitution as part of a tradition, called Intergenerational prostitution. In pre-modern Korea, many women from the lower caste Cheonmin, known as Kisaeng, were trained to provide entertainment, conversation, and sexual services to upper-class men.

Women with illegal resident status are disproportionately involved with prostitution. For example, in 1997, Le Monde diplomatique stated that 80% of prostitutes in Amsterdam were foreigners and 70% had no immigration papers.

=== Forced sexual services ===
==== By military forces ====
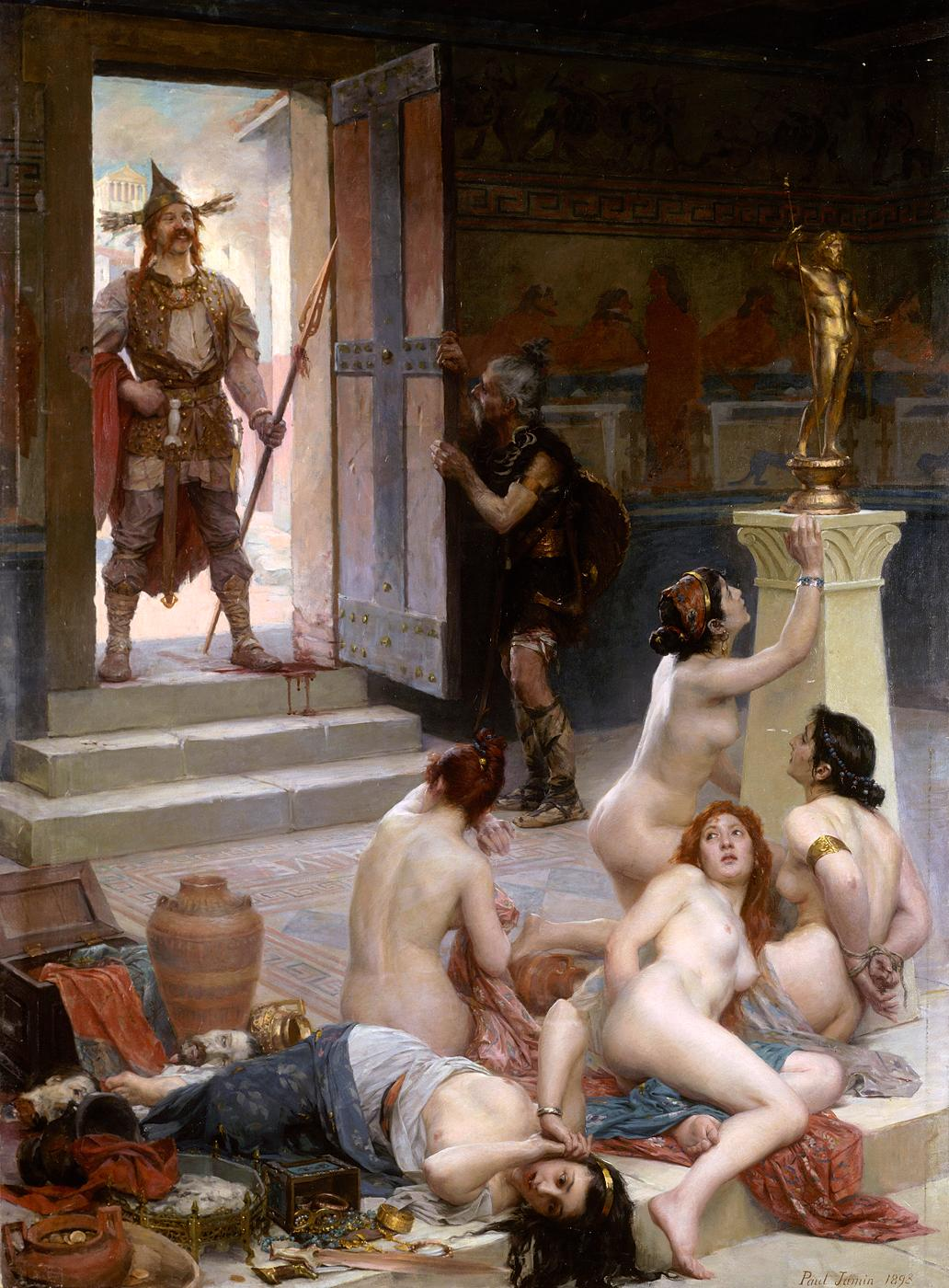
Brennus and His Share of the Spoils, by Paul Jamin, 1893

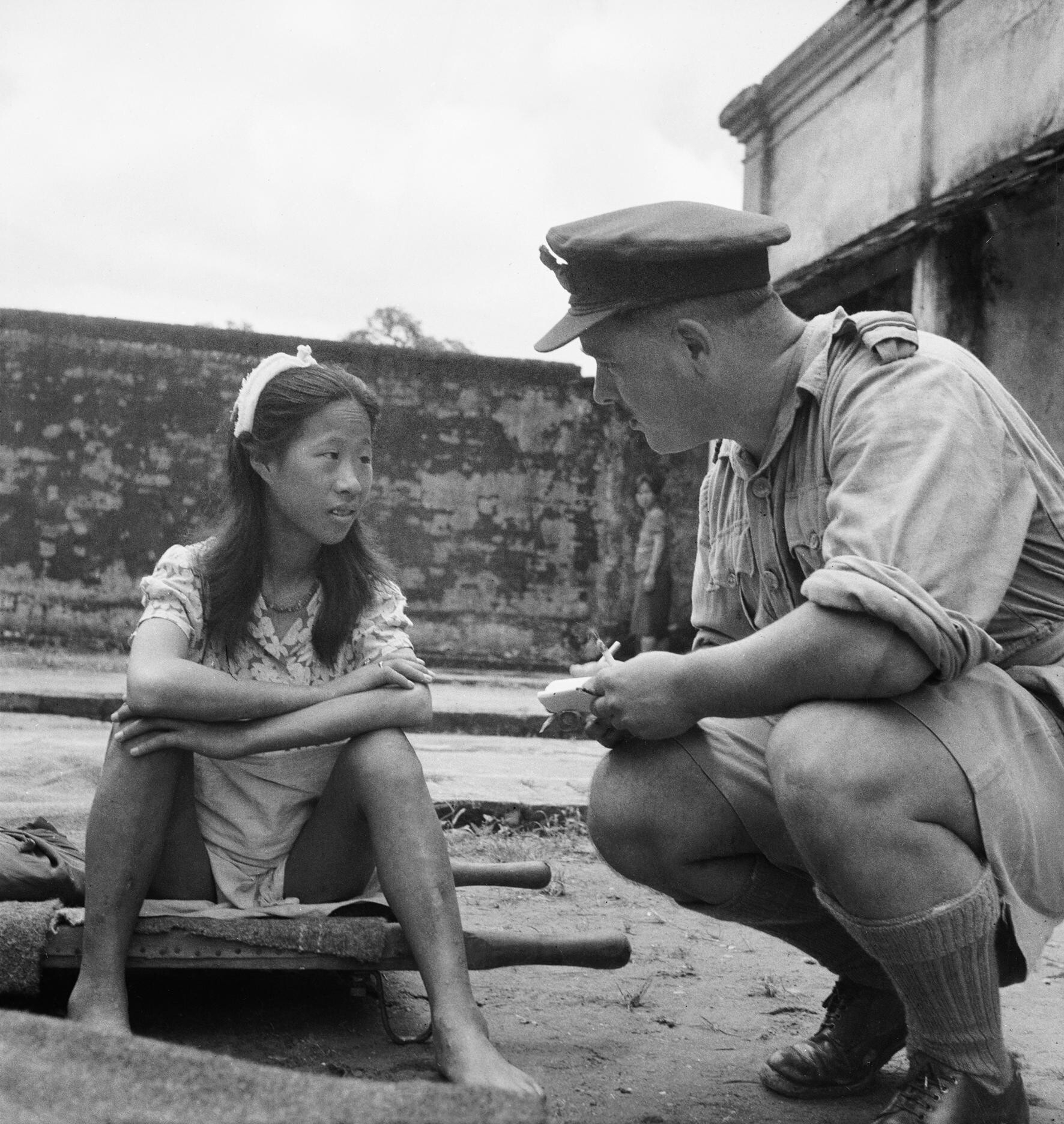
Rangoon, Burma. 8 August 1945. A young ethnic Chinese woman from one of the Imperial Japanese Army's "comfort battalions" is interviewed by an Allied officer.

Militarism produces environments that allow for increased violence against women. War rapes have accompanied warfare in virtually every known historical era. War rapes are rapes committed by soldiers, other combatants, or civilians during armed conflict, war, or military occupation, distinguished from sexual assaults and rapes committed amongst troops in military service. It also covers women forced into prostitution or sexual slavery by an occupying power. During World War II, the Japanese military established brothels filled with "comfort women", girls and women forced into sexual slavery for soldiers, exploiting women for the access and entitlement of men.

Rape during the Bangladesh Liberation War by members of the Pakistani military and the militias that supported them led to the rape of 200,000 women over a period of nine months. Rape during the Bosnian War was used as a systematized instrument of war by Serb armed forces, predominantly targeting women and girls of the Bosniak ethnic group for physical and moral destruction. Estimates of the number of women raped during the war range from 50,000 to 60,000; as of 2010 only 12 cases have been prosecuted.

The 1998 International Criminal Tribunal for Rwanda recognized rape in the Rwandan Genocide as a war crime.

According to one report, the Islamic State of Iraq and the Levant's capture of Iraqi cities in June 2014 was accompanied by an upsurge in crimes against women, including kidnapping and rape. The Guardian reported that ISIL's extremist agenda extended to women's bodies and that women living under their control were being captured and raped. Fighters are told that they are free to have sex and rape non-Muslim captive women. Haleh Esfandiari from the Woodrow Wilson International Center for Scholars highlighted abuse of local women by ISIL militants after they captured an area. "They usually take the older women to a makeshift slave market and try to sell them. The younger girls... are raped or married off to fighters," she said, adding, "It's based on temporary marriages, and once these fighters have had sex with these young girls, they just pass them on to other fighters." In December 2014 the Iraqi Ministry of Human Rights announced that the Islamic State of Iraq and the Levant had killed over 150 women and girls in Fallujah who refused to participate in sexual jihad.

During the Rohingya genocide (2016–present), the Armed Forces of Myanmar, along with the Myanmar Border Guard Police and Buddhist militias of Rakhine, committed widespread gang rapes and other forms of sexual violence against the Rohingya Muslim women and girls. A January 2018 study estimated that the military and local Rakhine Buddhists perpetrated gang rapes and other sexual violence against 18,000 Rohingya Muslim women and girls. The Human Rights Watch stated that gang rapes and sexual violence were committed as part of the military's ethnic cleansing campaign, while the United Nations Special Representative of the Secretary General on Sexual Violence in Conflict, Pramila Patten, said that Rohingya women and girls were made the "systematic" target of rapes and sexual violence because of their ethnic identity and religion. Other forms of sexual violence included sexual slavery in military captivity, forced public nudity, and humiliation. Some women and girls were raped to death, while others were found traumatised with raw wounds upon arrival in refugee camps in Bangladesh. Human Rights Watch reported a 15-year-old girl was ruthlessly dragged on the ground for over 50 feet and then was raped by 10 Burmese soldiers.

==== By criminal groups ====
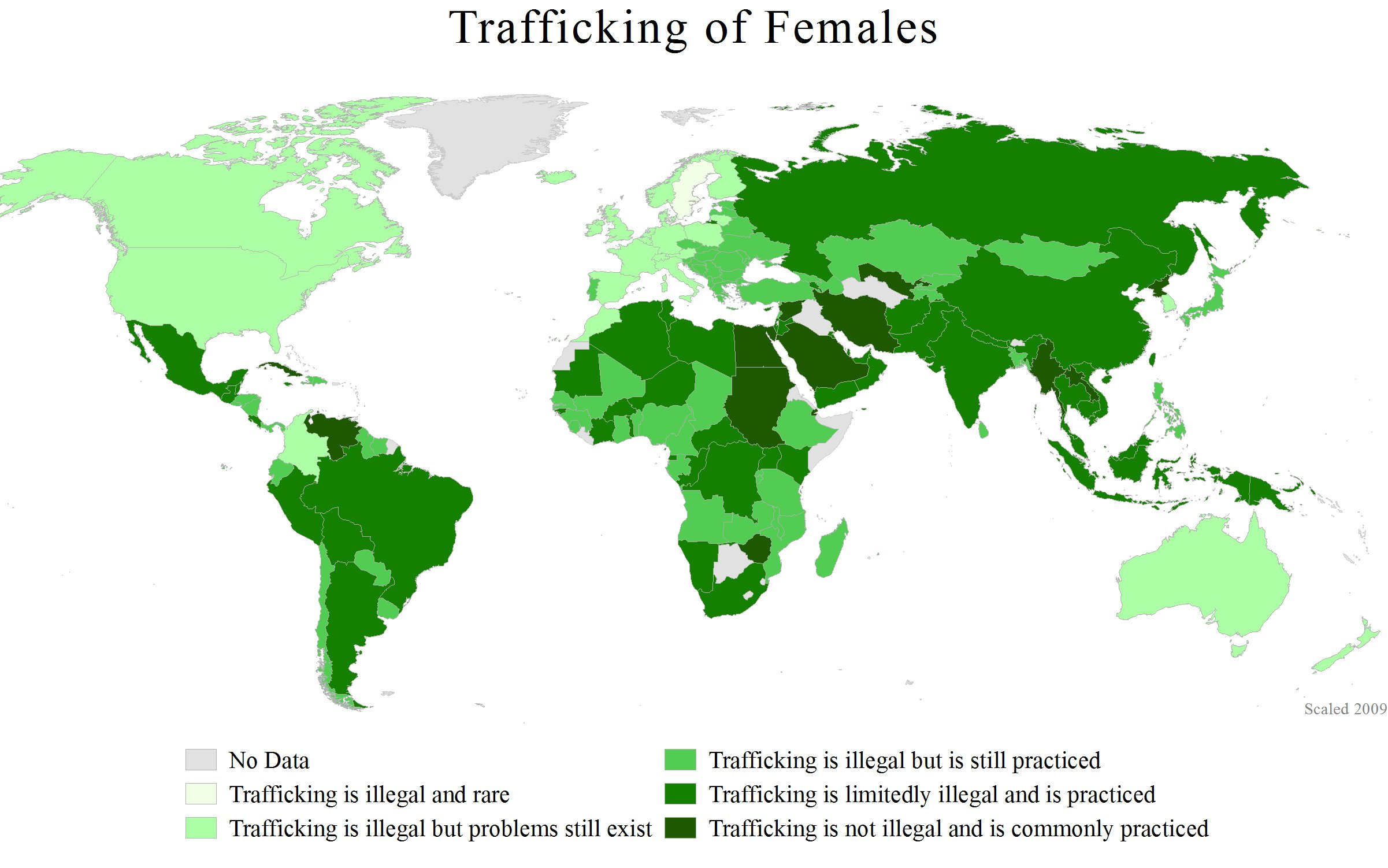
Countries by prevalence of female trafficking

Human trafficking refers to the acquisition of persons by improper means such as force, fraud or deception, with the aim of exploiting them. The Protocol to Prevent, Suppress and Punish Trafficking in Persons, especially Women and Children states,

"Trafficking in persons" shall mean the recruitment, transportation, transfer, harbouring or receipt of persons, by means of the threat or use of force or other forms of coercion, of abduction, of fraud, of deception, of the abuse of power or of a position of vulnerability or of the giving or receiving of payments or benefits to achieve the consent of a person having control over another person, for the purpose of exploitation. Exploitation shall include, at a minimum, the exploitation of the prostitution of others or other forms of sexual exploitation, forced labour or services, slavery or practices similar to slavery, servitude or the removal of organs.

Because of the illegal nature of trafficking, reliable data on its extent is limited. The WHO states "Current evidence strongly suggests that those who are trafficked into the sex industry and as domestic servants are more likely to be women and children." A 2006 study in Europe on trafficked women found that the women were subjected to serious forms of abuse, such as physical or sexual violence, affecting their physical and mental health.

Forced prostitution is prostitution resulting from coercion by a third party. In forced prostitution, the party/parties who force the victim to be subjected to unwanted sexual acts exercise coercive control over the victim.

== Domestic violence ==
=== Violence related to acquiring a partner ===
Single and economically independent women have been vilified by certain groups of men. In Hassi Messaoud in Algeria in 2001, mobs targeted single women, attacking 95 and killing at least six and, in 2011, similar attacks happened again throughout Algeria.

Stalking is unwanted or obsessive attention by an individual or group toward another person, often manifested through persistent harassment, intimidation, or following/monitoring of the victim. Stalking is often understood as "a course of conduct directed at a specific person that would cause a reasonable person to feel fear.". Although stalkers are frequently portrayed as strangers, they are most often known people, such as former or current partners, friends, colleagues or acquaintances. In the U.S., a survey by NVAW found that only 23% of female victims were stalked by strangers. Stalking by partners can be very dangerous, as it sometimes escalates into severe violence, including murder. Police statistics from the 1990s in Australia indicated that 87.7% of stalking offenders were male and 82.4% of stalking victims were female.

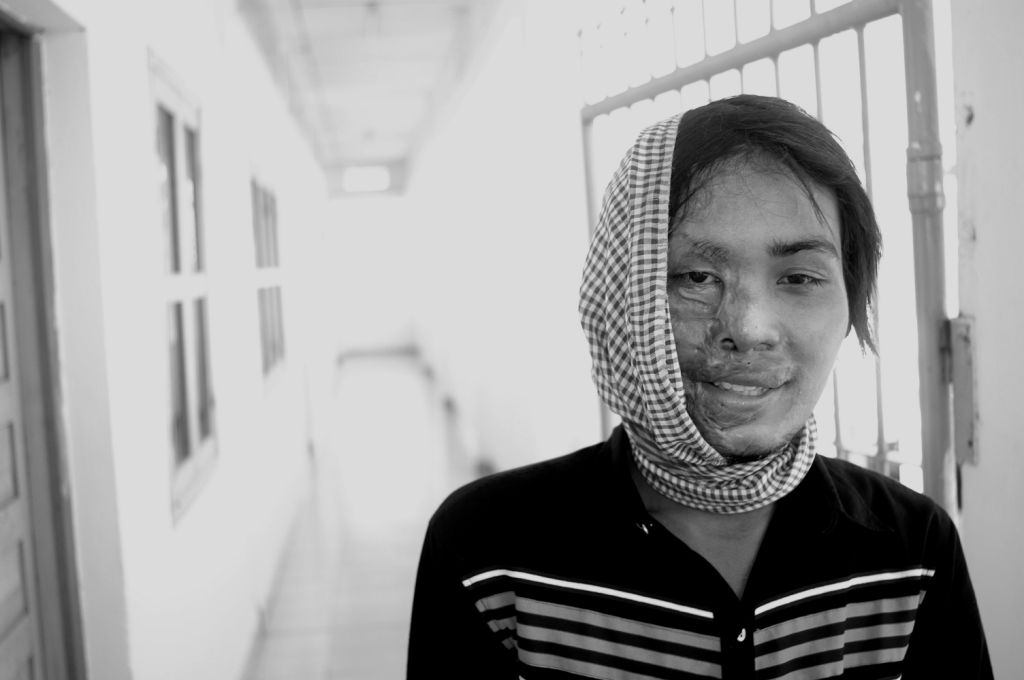
Women are the overwhelming majority of victims of acid attacks and it is often motivated by rejection and jealousy.

An acid attack is the act of throwing acid at someone with the intention of injuring or disfiguring them. Women and girls are the victims in 75–80% of cases and are often connected to domestic disputes, including dowry disputes, refusal of a marriage proposal, or sexual advances. The acid is usually thrown at the face, burning tissue, often exposing and sometimes dissolving the bones. The long-term consequences of these attacks include blindness and permanent scarring of the face and body. Such attacks are most common in South Asia, in countries such as Bangladesh, Pakistan, and India; and in Southeast Asia, especially in Cambodia.

==== Forced marriage ====
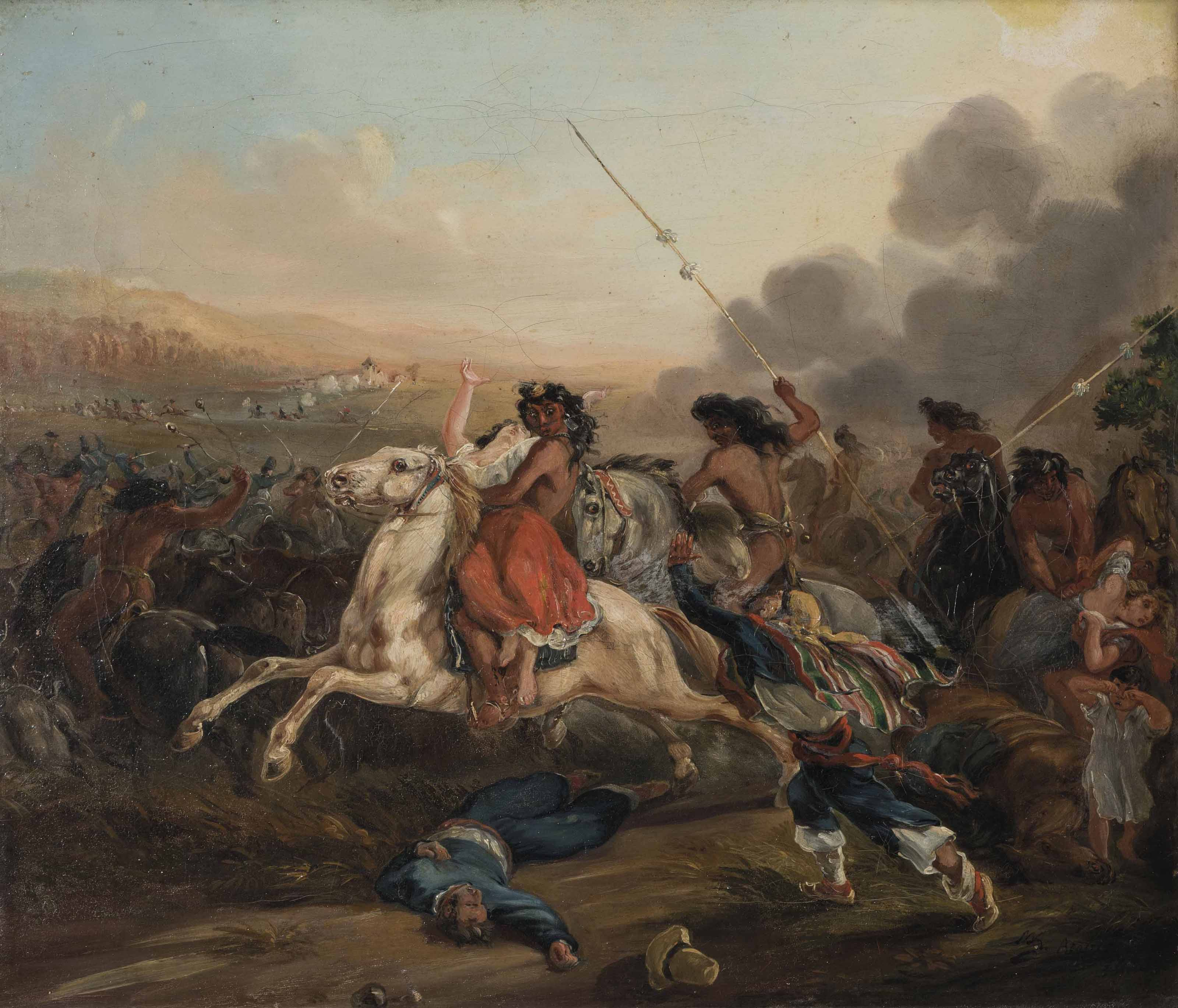
The painting depicts a Chilean woman being kidnapped during a malón. Bride kidnapping for the purpose of forced marriage and forced pregnancy was common through the history in many countries.

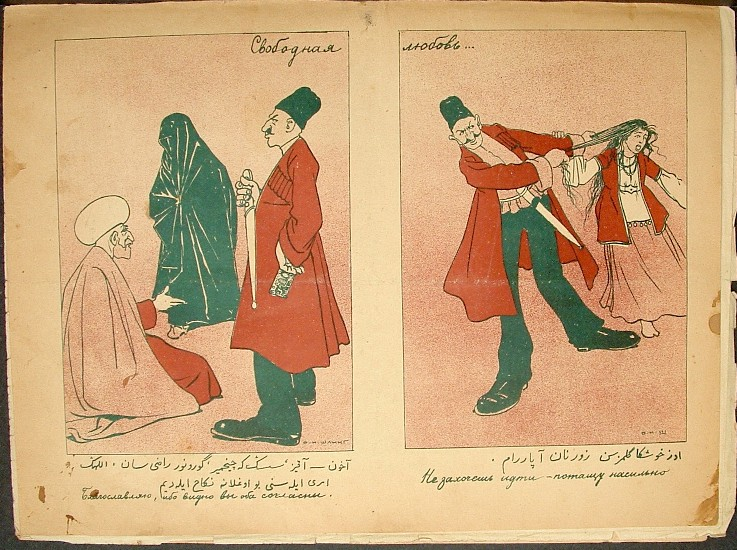
Criticism of the Azeri custom of forced marriage, as depicted in the early 20th-century satirical periodical Molla Nasraddin

A forced marriage is a marriage against the will of one or both parties. Forced marriages are most common in South Asia, the Middle East, and Africa. The customs of bride price and dowry, which exist in many parts of the world, contribute to this practice. A forced marriage is often the result of a dispute between families, where the dispute is 'resolved' by giving a female from one family to the other.

The custom of bride kidnapping continues in some Central Asian countries, such as Kyrgyzstan, Kazakhstan, Uzbekistan, and the Caucasus, or in parts of Africa, especially Ethiopia. A girl or woman is abducted by the would-be groom, often helped by his friends. The victim is often raped by the would-be groom, after which he may try to negotiate a bride price with village elders to legitimize the marriage.

Forced and child marriages are practiced by some inhabitants of Tanzania. Girls are sold by their families to older men for financial benefits, and often girls are married off as soon as they hit puberty, which can be as young as seven years old. To the older men, these young brides act as symbols of masculinity and accomplishment. Child brides endure forced sex, causing health risks and growth impediments. Primary education is usually not completed for young girls in forced marriages. Married and pregnant students are often discriminated against, expelled, and excluded from school. The Law of Marriage Act currently does not address issues with guardianship and child marriage. The issue of child marriage is not addressed enough in this law, and only establishes a minimum age of 18 for the men of Tanzania.

==== Dowry violence ====
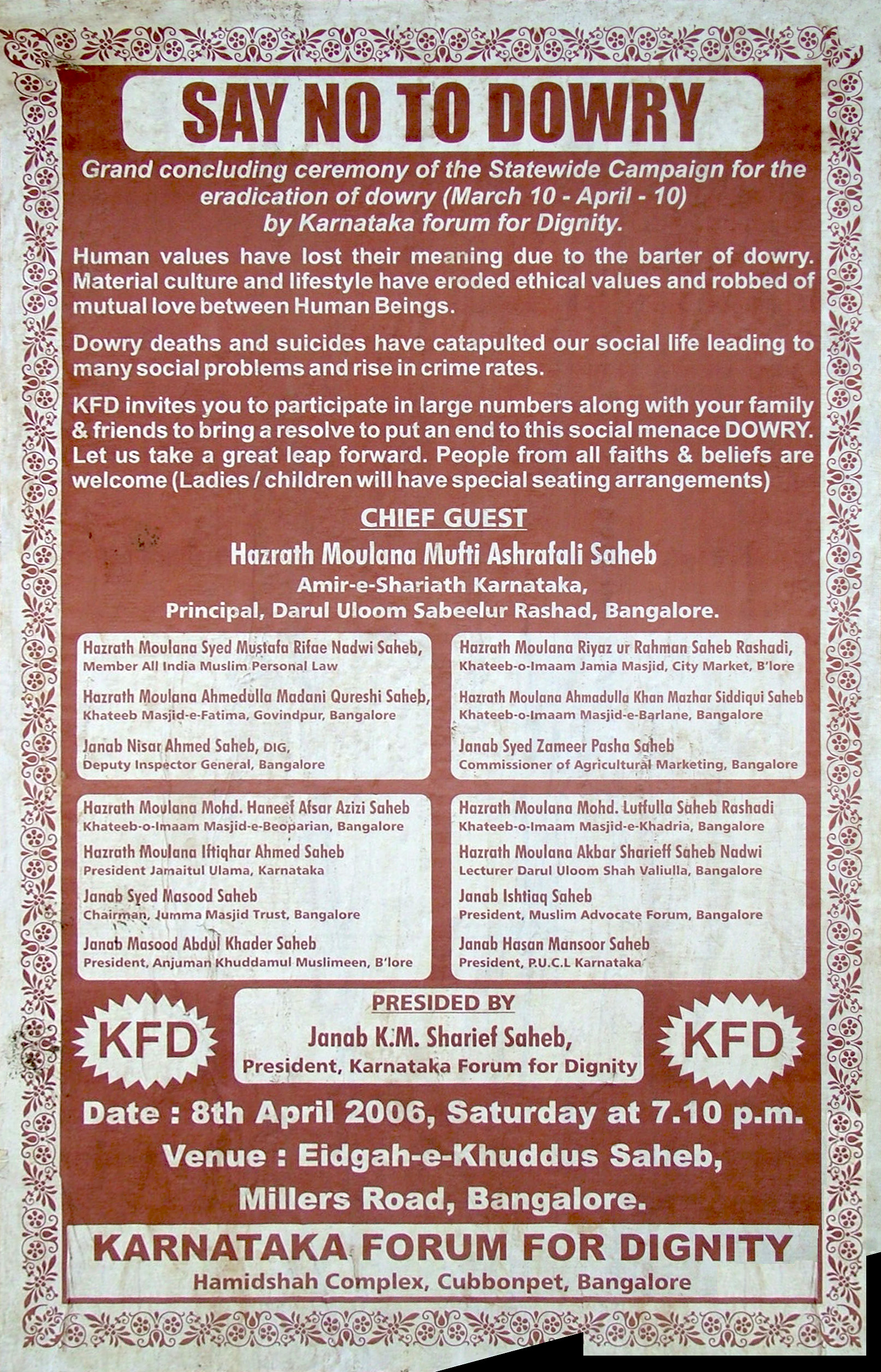
Anti-dowry poster in Bangalore, India

The custom of dowry, which is common in South Asia, especially in India, is the trigger of many forms of violence against women. Bride burning is the killing of a bride at home by her husband or husband's family, due to his dissatisfaction over the dowry provided by her family. Dowry death refers to women and girls being killed or committing suicide due to disputes regarding dowry. Dowry violence is common in India, Pakistan, Bangladesh and Nepal. In India, in 2011 alone, the National Crime Records Bureau reported 8,618 dowry deaths, while unofficial figures suggest the numbers to be at least three times higher.

=== Violence within a relationship ===
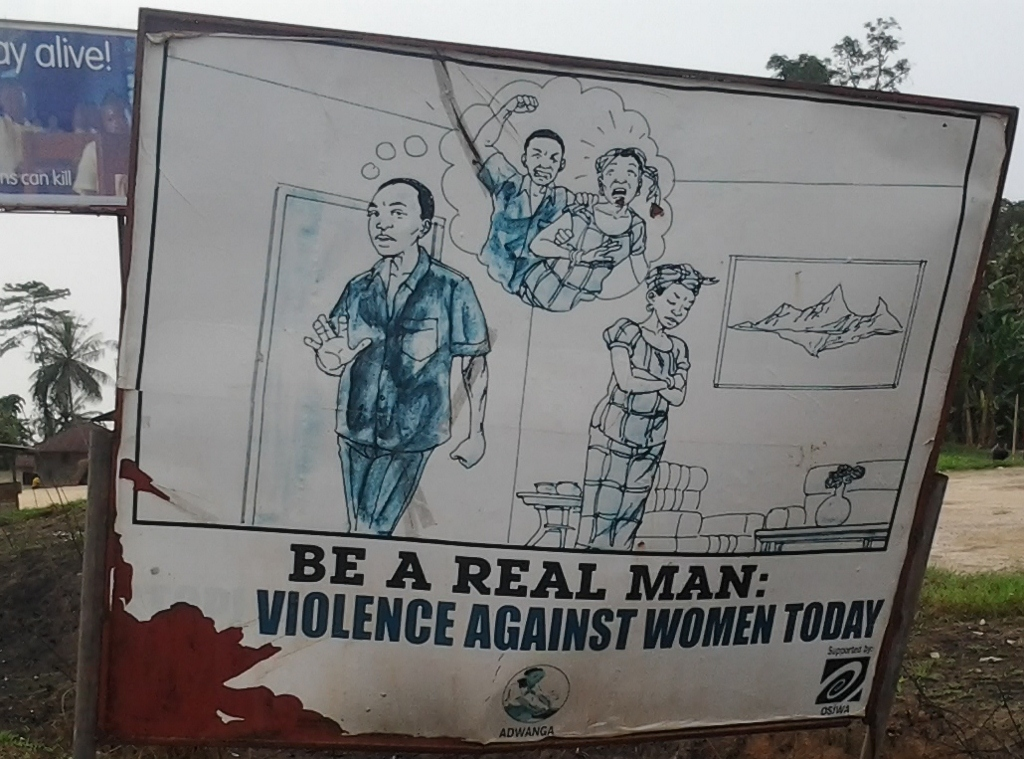
Anti-domestic violence sign in Liberia

The relation between violence against women and marriage laws, regulations and traditions has also been discussed. Roman law gave men the right to punish their wives, even to the point of death. The US and English law subscribed until the 20th century to the system of coverture, a legal doctrine where upon marriage, a woman's legal rights were subsumed by her husband's. Common-law in the United States and in the UK allowed for domestic violence and in the UK, before 1891, the husband had the right to inflict moderate corporal punishment on his wife to keep her "within the bounds of duty". Today many countries severely restrict the rights of married women: for example, in Yemen, marriage regulations state that a wife must obey her husband and must not leave home without his permission. In Iraq husbands have a legal right to "punish" their wives. The criminal code states in Paragraph 41 that there is no crime, if an act is committed while exercising a legal right; examples of such legal rights include: "The punishment of a wife by her husband, the disciplining by parents and teachers of children under their authority within certain limits prescribed by law or by custom". In the West, married women faced discrimination until some decades ago: for instance, in France, married women received the right to work without their husband's permission in 1965. In Spain, during the Franco era, a married woman required her husband's consent (permiso marital) for nearly all economic activities, including employment, ownership of property and traveling away from home; the permiso marital was abolished in 1975. Concerns exist about violence related to marriage – both inside marriage (physical abuse, sexual violence, restriction of liberty) and in relation to marriage customs (dowry, bride price, forced marriage, child marriage, marriage by abduction, violence related to female premarital virginity). Claudia Card, professor of philosophy at the University of Wisconsin-Madison, writes:

The legal rights of access that married partners have to each other's persons, property, and lives makes it all but impossible for a spouse to defend herself (or himself), or to be protected against torture, rape, battery, stalking, mayhem, or murder by the other spouse... Legal marriage thus enlists state support for conditions conducive to murder and mayhem.

==== Physical ====
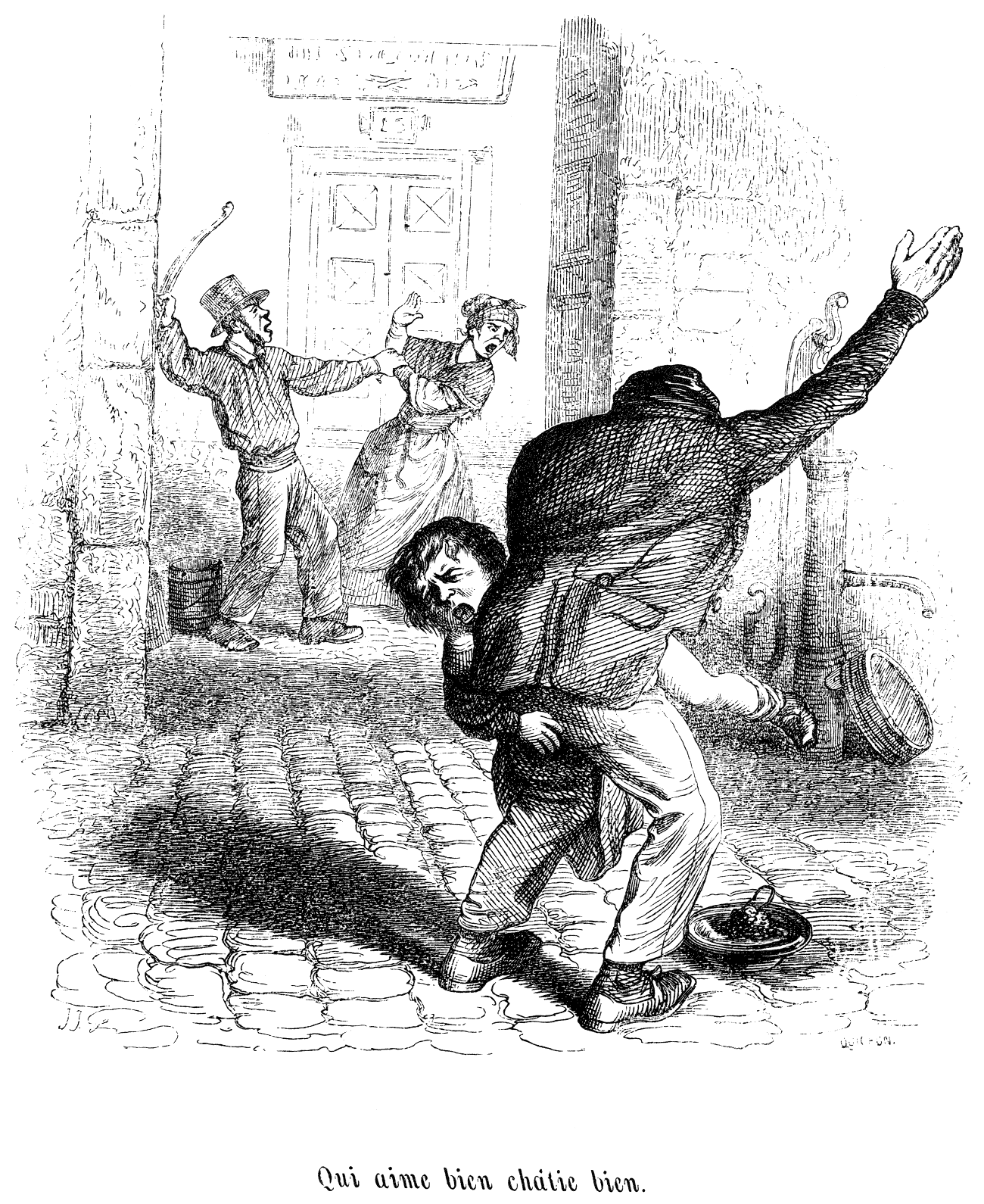
An illustration from JJ Grandville's Cent Proverbes (1845) captioned "Qui aime bien châtie bien" (Who loves well, punishes well). A man beating a woman is shown in the back.

Women are more likely to be victimized by someone that they are intimate with, commonly called "intimate partner violence" (IPV). IPV is often unreported to police and making it difficult to estimate the true magnitude of the problem. Though this violence is often considered only an issue within heterosexual relationships, it also occurs in lesbian relationships, daughter-mother relationships, roommate relationships and other domestic relationships involving women. Violence against women in lesbian relationships is about as common as violence against women in heterosexual relationships.

Women are much more likely than men to be murdered by an intimate partner. In the United States, in 2005, 1181 women were killed by intimate partners, compared to 329 men. An estimated 30% or more of women who are admitted to the ER could be victims of domestic violence.

In England and Wales about 100 women are killed by partners or former partners each year, while 21 men were killed in 2010. In 2008, in France, 156 women were killed by their intimate partner, compared to 27 men. According to the WHO, globally, as many as 38% of murders of women are committed by an intimate partner. A UN report compiled from a number of different studies conducted in at least 71 countries found domestic violence against women to be most prevalent in Ethiopia. A study by Pan American Health Organization conducted in 12 Latin American countries found the highest prevalence of domestic violence against women to be in Bolivia. Finland has received major international criticism for the legal process for violence against women; with authors noting that a high level of equality for women in the public sphere (as in Finland) should never be equated with equality in all other aspects of women's lives.

The American Psychiatric Association planning and research committees for the forthcoming DSM-5 (2013) have canvassed a series of new Relational disorders, which include Marital Conflict Disorder Without Violence or Marital Abuse Disorder (Marital Conflict Disorder With Violence). Couples with marital disorders sometimes come to clinical attention because the couple recognize long-standing dissatisfaction with their marriage and come to the clinician on their own initiative, or are referred by a health care professional. Alternatively, there is serious violence in the marriage that is "usually the husband battering the wife". In these cases the emergency room or a legal authority often is the first to notify the clinician. Most importantly, marital violence "is a major risk factor for serious injury and even death and women in violent marriages are at much greater risk of being seriously injured or killed (National Advisory Council on Violence Against Women 2000)".

The authors conclude with "very recent information" on the course of violent marriages, suggesting that "over time a husband's battering may abate somewhat, but perhaps because he has successfully intimidated his wife. The risk of violence remains strong in a marriage in which it has been a feature in the past. Thus, treatment is essential here; the clinician cannot just wait and watch." The most urgent clinical priority is the protection of the wife because she is most frequently at risk, and clinicians must be aware that supporting assertiveness by a battered wife may lead to more beatings or even death.

==== Sexual ====
Marital or spousal rape was once widely condoned or ignored by law and is now widely considered unacceptable violence against women, repudiated by international conventions, and increasingly criminalized. Still, in many countries, spousal rape remains legal or is illegal but widely tolerated and accepted as a husband's prerogative. The criminalization of spousal rape is recent, having occurred during the past few decades. Traditional understanding and views of marriage, rape, sexuality, gender roles and self determination have started to be challenged in most Western countries during the 1960s and 1970s, leading to the criminalization of marital rape in the following decades. With a few notable exceptions, it was during the past 30 years that most laws against marital rape have been enacted. Some countries in Scandinavia and in the former Communist Bloc of Europe made spousal rape illegal before 1970, but most Western countries criminalized it only in the 1980s and 1990s. In many parts of the world, laws against marital rape are very new, having been enacted in the 2000s.

Marital rape illegal Marital rape legal 'Marital rape' legal, but forced marital sex still punishable. Legal status unclear

In Canada, marital rape was made illegal in 1983, when several legal changes were made, including changing the rape statute to sexual assault and making the laws gender neutral. In Ireland, spousal rape was outlawed in 1990. In the US, the criminalization of marital rape started in the mid-1970s, and in 1993, North Carolina became the last state to make marital rape illegal. In England and Wales, marital rape was made illegal in 1991. The views of Sir Matthew Hale, a 17th-century jurist, published in The History of the Pleas of the Crown (1736), stated that a husband cannot be guilty of the rape of his wife because the wife "hath given up herself in this kind to her husband, which she cannot retract"; in England and Wales, this would remain law for more than 250 years, until it was abolished by the Appellate Committee of the House of Lords, in the case of R v. R in 1991. In the Netherlands, marital rape was also made illegal in 1991. One of the last Western countries to criminalize marital rape was Germany, in 1997.

Dating abuse, or dating violence, is the perpetration of coercion, intimidation, or assault in the context of dating or courtship. It is also when one partner tries to maintain abusive power and control. Dating violence is defined by the CDC as "the physical, sexual, psychological, or emotional violence within a dating relationship, including stalking".

=== Religious ===
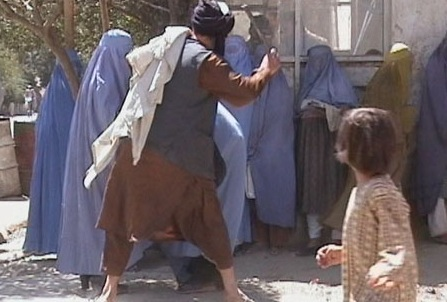
A member of the Taliban's religious police beating a woman in Kabul, 2001 showing the treatment of women by the Taliban

The relationship between religious violence and gender is controversial. The Bible at 1 Corinthians 7:3-5 explains that one has a "conjugal duty" to have sexual relations with one's spouse (in sharp opposition to sex outside marriage, which is considered a sin) and states, "The wife does not have authority over her own body, but the husband does. And likewise, the husband does not have authority over his own body, but the wife does. Do not deprive one another." Some conservative religious figures interpret this as rejecting to possibility of marital rape. Islam makes reference to sexual relations in marriage too, notably: "Allah's Apostle said, 'If a husband calls his wife to his bed (i.e. to have sexual relation) and she refuses and causes him to sleep in anger, the angels will curse her till morning';" and several comments on the issue of marital rape made by Muslim religious leaders have been criticized.

=== Widowhood related violence ===
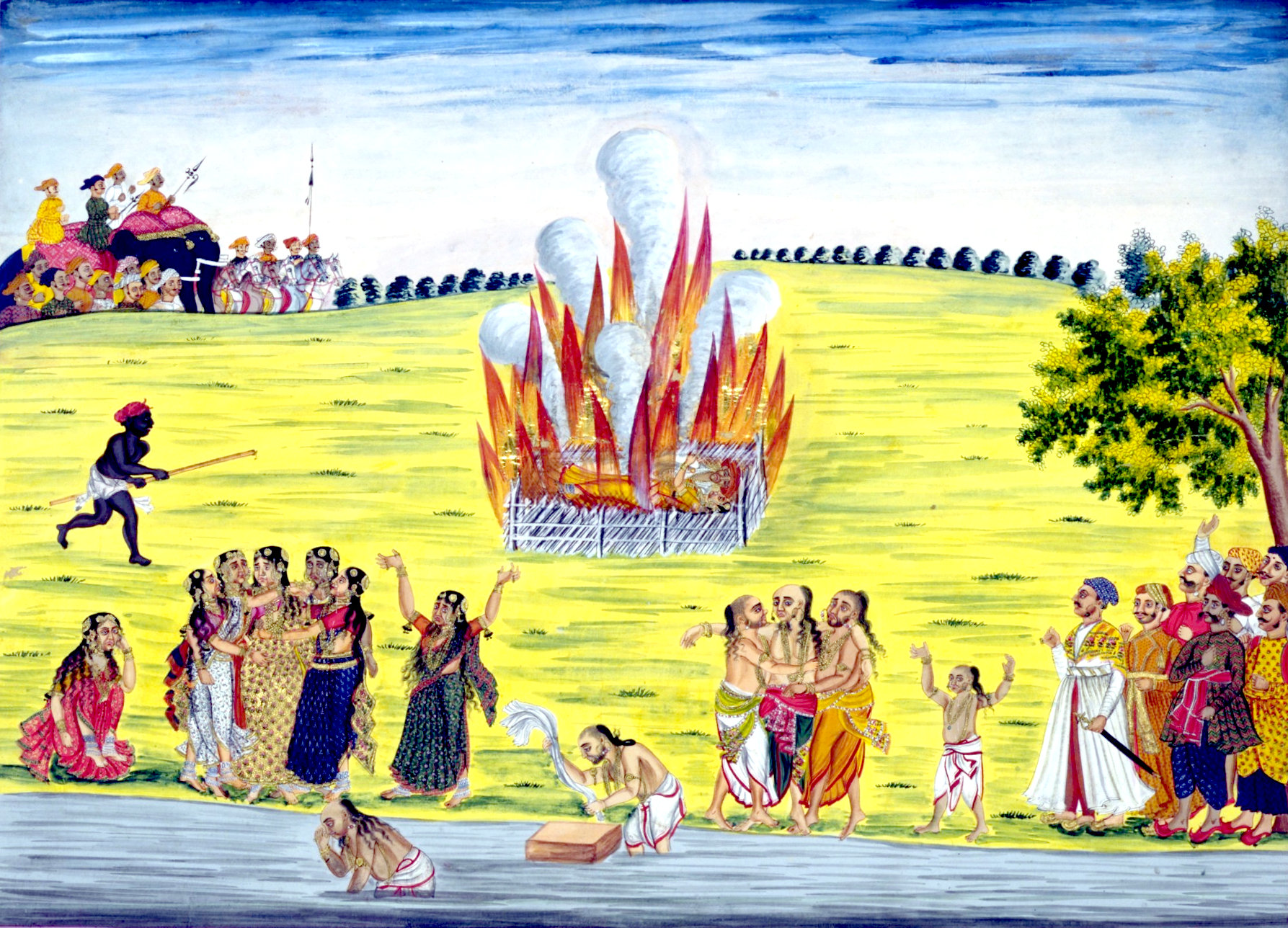
Sati (a Hindu practice whereby a widow immolates herself on the funeral pyre of her husband) ceremony

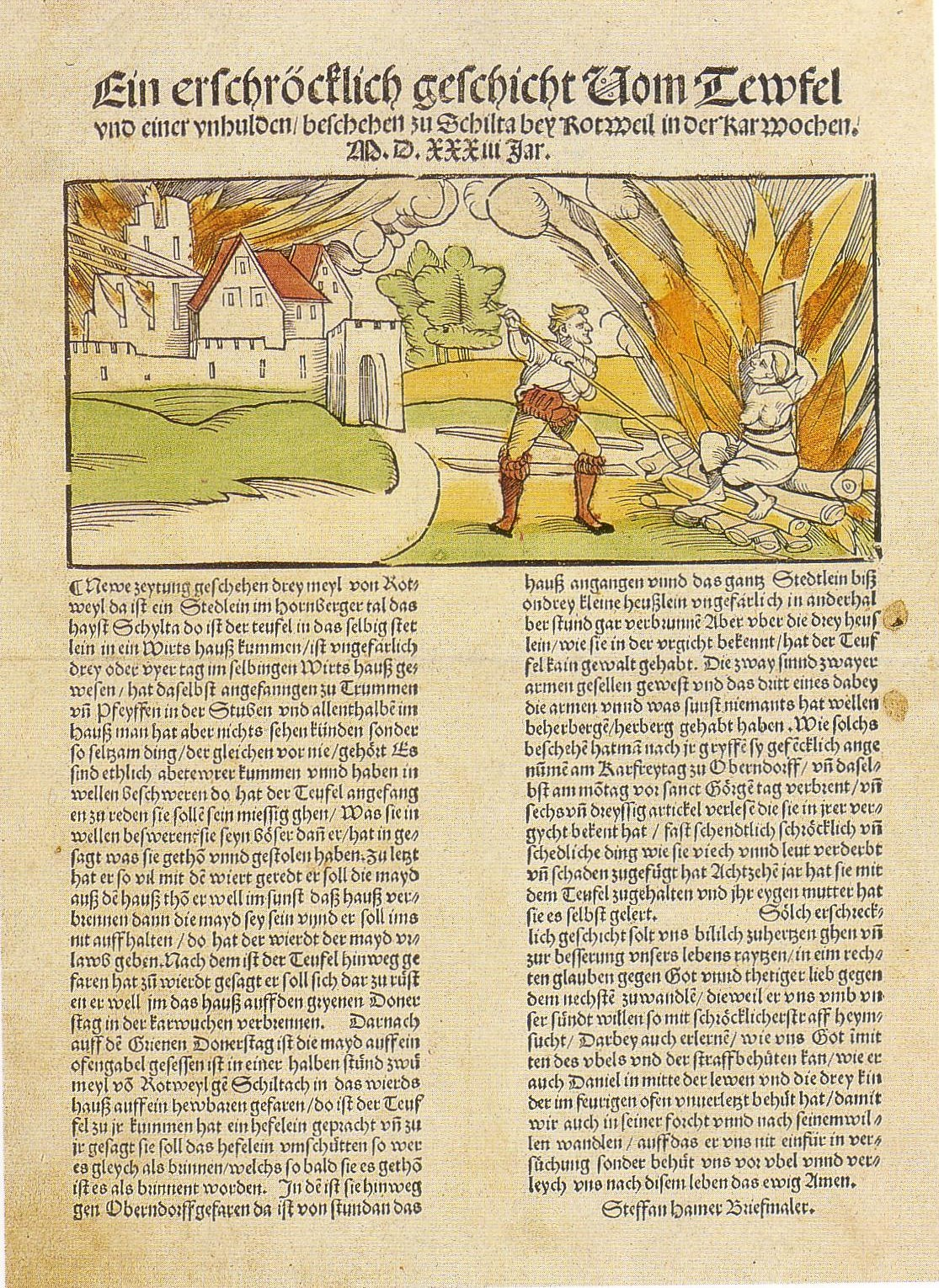
A 1533 account of the execution of a witch charged with burning the German town of Schiltach in 1531

Widows have been subjected to forced remarriage called widow inheritance, where they are forced to marry a male relative of their late husband. Another practice is the banned remarriage of widows, which is legal in India and Korea. A more extreme version is the ritual killing of widows, as seen in India and Fiji. Sati is the burning of widows, and although sati in India is today an almost defunct practice, isolated incidents have occurred in recent years, such as the 1987 sati of Roop Kanwar, as well as several incidents in rural areas in 2002 and 2006. A traditional idea, upheld in some places in Africa, is that an unmarried widow is unholy and "disturbed", if she is unmarried and abstains from sex for some period of time. This fuels the practice of widow cleansing where the unmarried widow is required to have sexual intercourse as a form of ritual purification, which is commenced with a ceremony for the neighborhood to witness that she is now purified.

Unmarried widows are most likely to be accused and killed as witches. Witch trials in the early modern period (between the 15th and 18th centuries) were common in Europe and in the European colonies in North America. Today, there remain regions of the world (such as parts of Sub-Saharan Africa, rural North India, and Papua New Guinea) where belief in witchcraft is held by many people, and women accused of being witches are subjected to serious violence.

== Non-intimate partner family violence ==
=== Infanticide and abandonment ===
India's child sex ratio, 2011

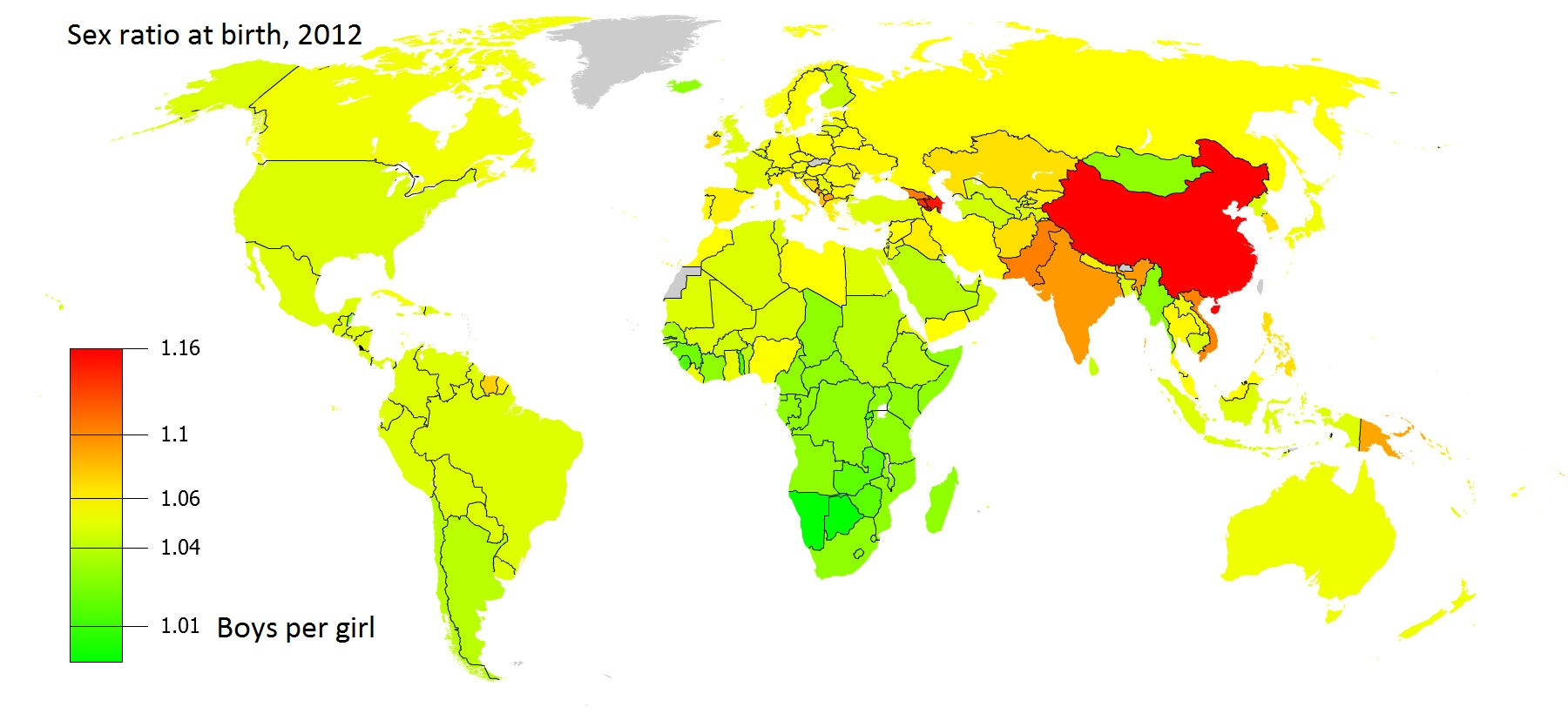
Birth sex ratios, 2012

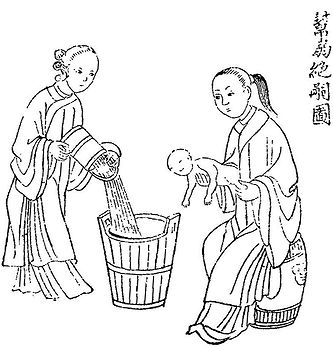
Chinese anti-infanticide tract circa 1800. China has a long history of son preference, which was aggravated after the enforcement of the one child policy.

Son preference is a custom prevalent in many societies, that in its extreme can lead to the rejection of daughters. Sex-selective abortion of females is more common among the higher income population, who can access medical technology. After birth, neglect and diverting resources to male children can lead to some countries having a skewed ratio with more boys than girls, with such practices killing an approximate 230,000 girls under five in India each year. In China, the one child policy increased sex-selective abortions and was largely responsible for an unbalanced sex ratio.The Dying Rooms is a 1995 television documentary film about Chinese state orphanages, which documented how parents abandoned their newborn girls into orphanages, where the staff would leave the children in rooms to die of thirst, or starvation.

Another manifestation of son preference is the violence inflicted against mothers who give birth to girls.

=== Body modification ===
==== Genitalia ====
Data map showing the percentage of women aged 15 to 49 who have undergone FGM (2020). There is no data for countries in light grey.

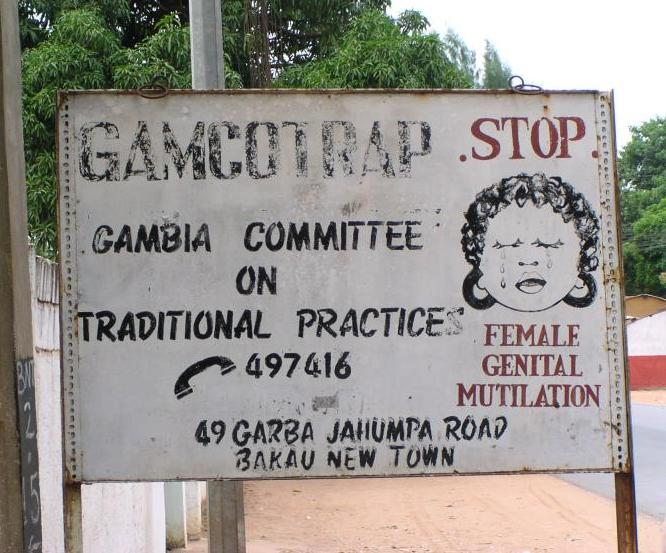
Anti-FGM road sign, Bakau, Gambia, 2005

Female genital mutilation (FGM) is defined by the World Health Organization (WHO) as "all procedures that involve partial or total removal of the external female genitalia or other injury to the female genital organs for non-medical reasons".

The WHO states: "The procedure has no health benefits for girls and women" and "Procedures can cause severe bleeding and problems urinating, and later cysts, infections, infertility, and complications in childbirth increase the risk of newborn deaths".

According to a 2016 UNICEF report, the top rates for FGM are in Somalia (with 98 percent of women affected), Guinea (97 percent), Djibouti (93 percent), Egypt (87 percent), Eritrea (83 percent), Mali (89 percent), Sierra Leone (90 percent), Sudan (87 percent), Gambia (75 percent), Burkina Faso (76 percent), Ethiopia (74 percent), Mauritania (69 percent), Liberia (50 percent), and Guinea-Bissau (45 percent). More than half of the cases documented by UNICEF are concentrated in just three countries (Indonesia, Egypt and Ethiopia).

FGM is linked to cultural rites and customs, including traditional practices, and religion. It continues to take place in different communities in Africa and the Middle East, including in places where it is banned by national legislation. According to a 2016 UNICEF report, at least 200 million of women and girls in Africa and the Middle East have experienced FGM. Due to globalization and immigration, FGM is spreading beyond the borders of Africa and the Middle East to countries such as Australia, Belgium, Canada, France, New Zealand, the U.S., and UK.

Although FGM is today associated with developing countries, this practice was common until the 1970s in parts of the Western world, too. FGM was considered a standard medical procedure in the United States for most of the 19th and 20th centuries. Physicians performed surgeries of varying invasiveness to treat a number of diagnoses, including hysteria, depression, nymphomania, and frigidity.

As of 2016, in Africa, FGM has been legally banned in Benin, Burkina Faso, the Central African Republic, Chad, Côte d'Ivoire, Djibouti, Egypt, Eritrea, Ethiopia, Gambia, Ghana, Guinea, Guinea Bissau, Kenya, Mauritania, Niger, Nigeria, Senegal, South Africa, Tanzania, Togo, Uganda, and Zambia. The Istanbul Convention prohibits female genital mutilation (Article 38).

Labia stretching is the act of lengthening the labia minora (the inner lips of the female genitals) through manual manipulation (pulling) or equipment (such as weights). It is often done by older women to girls.

==== Feet ====
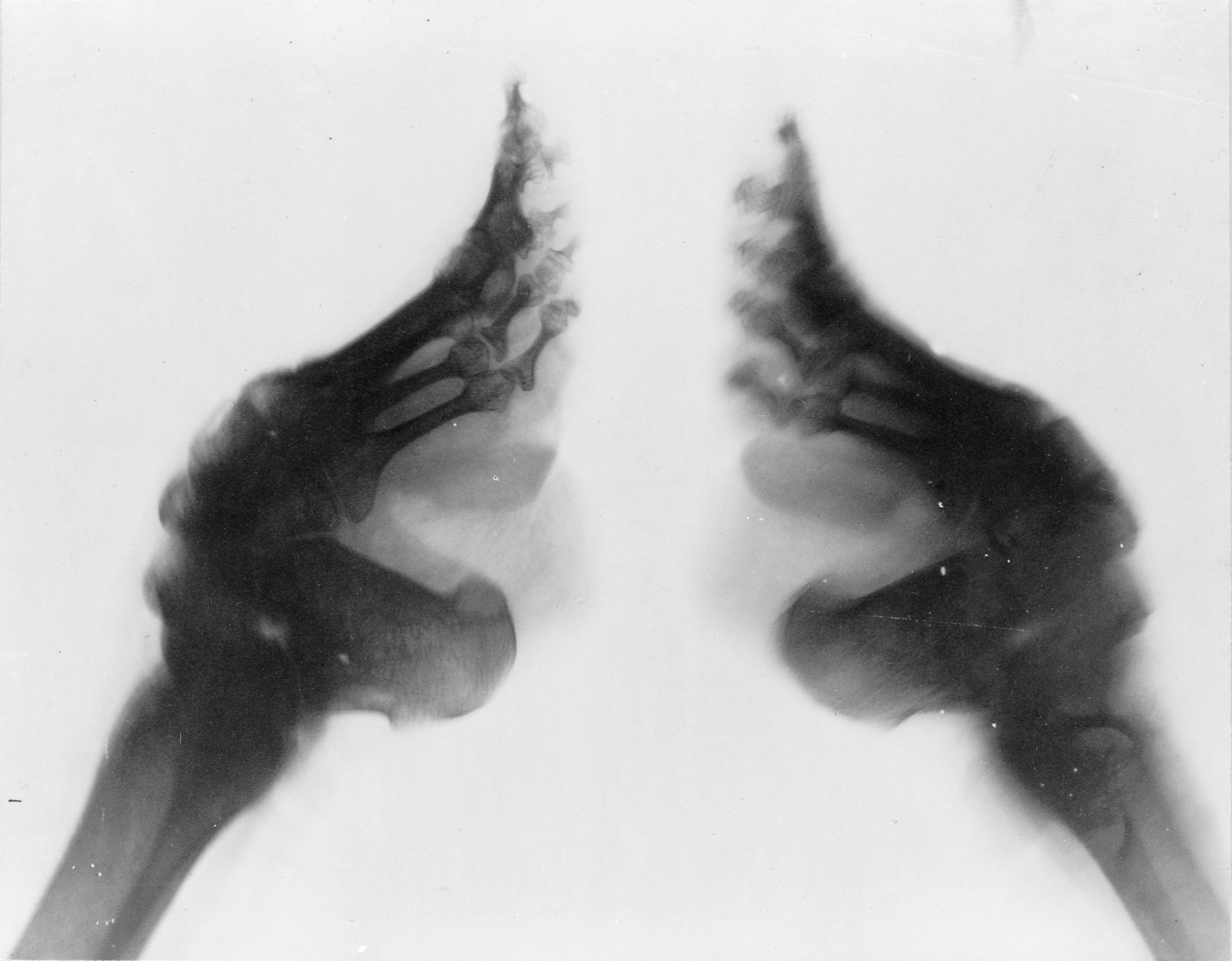
X-ray of bound feet, China

Foot-binding was a practice in China done to reduce the size of feet in girls. It was seen as more desirable and was likely to make a more prestigious marriage.

==== Force-feeding ====
In some countries, notably Mauritania, young girls are forcibly fattened to prepare them for marriage because obesity is seen as desirable. This practice of force-feeding is known as leblouh or gavage. The practice dates back to the 11th century, and has been reported to have made a significant comeback after a military junta took over the country in 2008.

=== Sexual initiation rites ===
Sexual "cleansing" is a ceremony where girls have sexual intercourse as a cleansing ritual following their first menstruation and is referred to as kusasa fumbi in some regions of Malawi. Prepubescent girls are often sent to a training camp where women known as anamkungwi, or "key leaders," teach the girls how to cook, clean, and have sexual intercourse in order to be wives. After the training, a man known as a hyena performs the cleansing for 12- to 17-year-old females for three days and the girl is sometimes required to perform a bare-breasted dance, known as chisamba, to signal the end of her initiation in front of the community.

=== Honor killings ===
Honor killings are a common form of violence against women in certain parts of the world. Honor killings are perpetrated by family members (usually husbands, fathers, uncles, or brothers) against women in the family who are believed to have caused dishonor to the family. The death of the dishonorable woman is believed to restore honor. These killings are a traditional practice believed to have originated from tribal customs, where an allegation against a woman can be enough to defile a family's reputation. Women are killed for reasons such as refusing to enter an arranged marriage, being in a relationship that is disapproved by their relatives, attempting to leave a marriage, having sex outside marriage, becoming the victim of rape, and dressing in ways that are deemed inappropriate, among others. In cultures where female virginity is highly valued and considered mandatory before marriage, in extreme cases, rape victims are killed in honor killings. Victims may also be forced by their families to marry the rapist in order to restore the family's "honor.". In Lebanon, the Campaign Against Lebanese Rape Law - Article 522 was launched in December 2016 to abolish the article that permitted a rapist to escape prison by marrying his victim. In Italy, before 1981, the Criminal Code provided for mitigating circumstances in case of a killing of a woman or her sexual partner for reasons related to honor, providing for a reduced sentence.

Honor killings are common in countries such as Afghanistan, Egypt, Iraq, Jordan, Lebanon, Libya, Morocco, Pakistan, Saudi Arabia, Syria, Turkey, and Yemen. Honor killings also occur in immigrant communities in Europe, the United States, and Canada. Although honor killings are most often associated with the Middle East and South Asia, they occur in other parts of the world too. In India, honor killings occur in the northern regions of the country, especially in the states of Punjab, Haryana, Bihar, Uttar Pradesh, Rajasthan, Jharkhand, Himachal Pradesh and Madhya Pradesh. In Turkey, honor killings are a serious problem in Southeastern Anatolia.

== Pregnancy-related violence ==
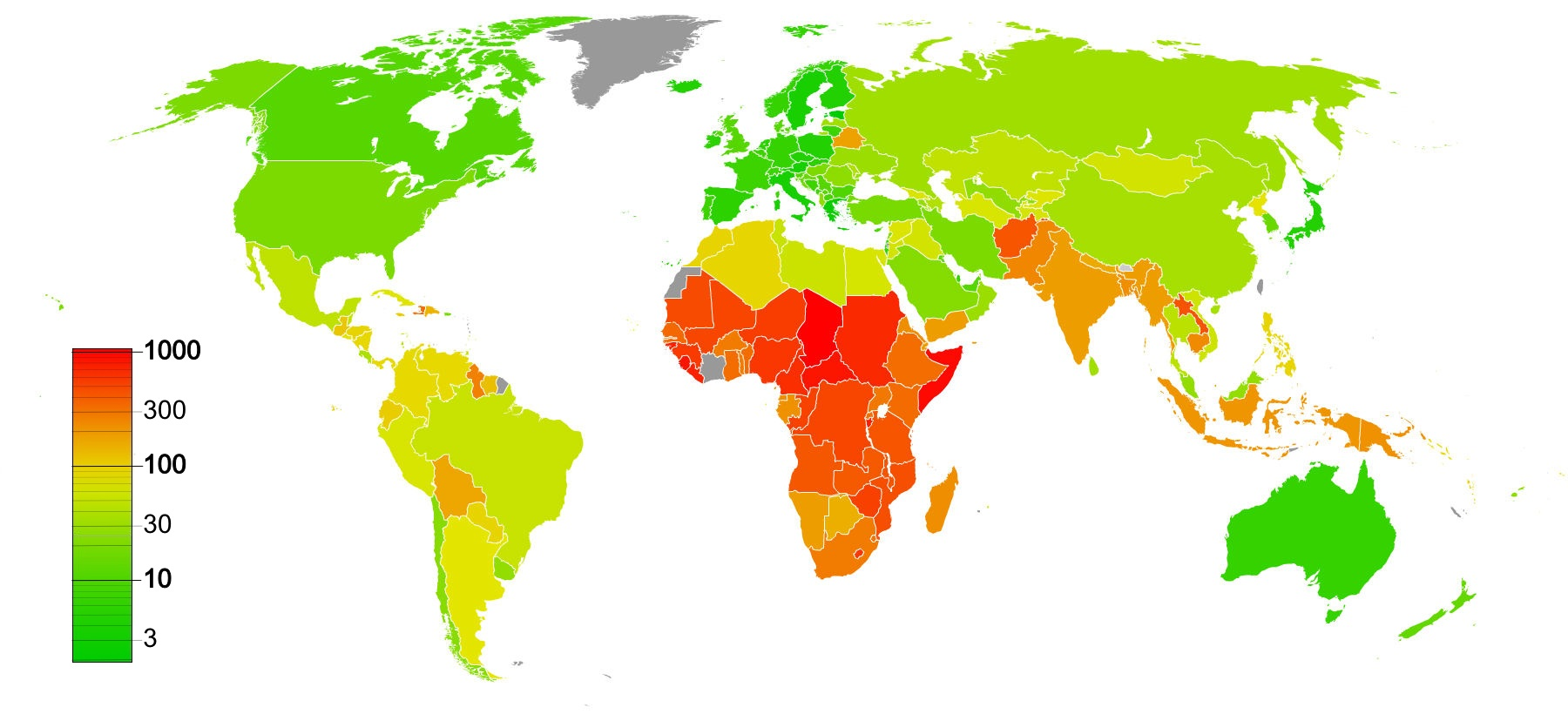
Maternal Mortality Rate worldwide, as defined by the number of maternal deaths per 100,000 live births from any cause related to or aggravated by pregnancy or its management, excluding accidental or incidental causes.

Obstetric violence refers to acts categorized as physically or psychologically violent in the context of labor and birth. A pregnant woman can sometimes be coerced into accepting surgical interventions that are done without her consent. This could include the "husband's stitch" in which one or more additional sutures than necessary are used to repair a woman's perineum after it has been torn or cut during childbirth with the intent of tightening the opening of the vagina and thereby enhancing the pleasure of her male sex partner during penetrative intercourse. Several Latin American countries have laws to protect against obstetric violence. Reproductive coercion is a collection of behaviors that interfere with decision-making related to reproductive health. According to the WHO, "discrimination in health care settings takes many forms and is often manifested when an individual or group is denied access to health care services that are otherwise available to others. It can also occur through denial of services that are only needed by certain groups, such as women."

=== Restrictions around menstruation ===
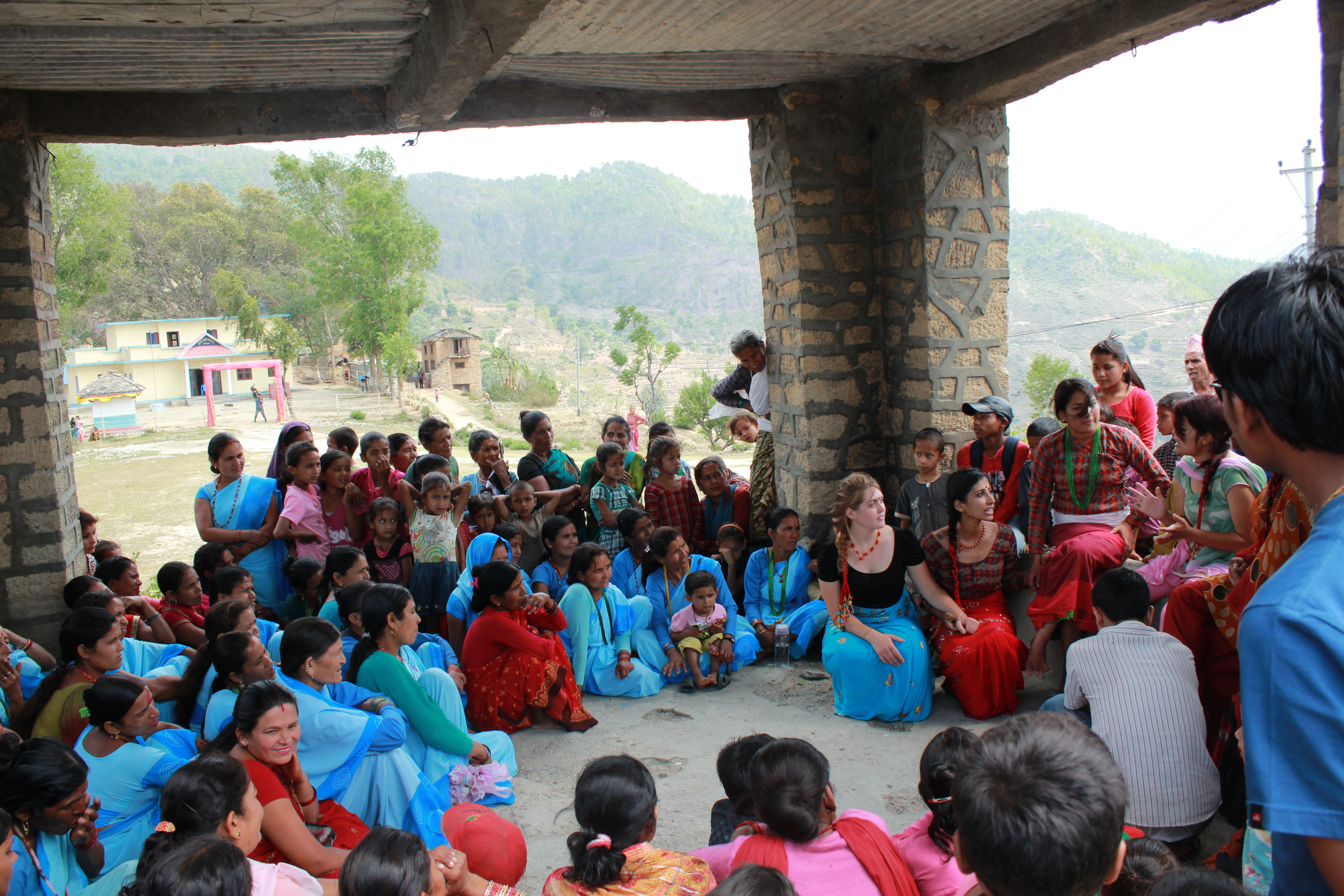
Awareness raising through education is taking place among young girls to modify or eliminate the practice of chhaupadi in Nepal.

Women in some cultures are forced into social isolation during their menstrual periods. In parts of Nepal, for instance, they are forced to live in sheds, are forbidden to touch men or even to enter the courtyard of their own homes, and are barred from consuming milk, yogurt, butter, meat, and various other foods, for fear they will contaminate those goods. Women have died during this period because of starvation, bad weather, or bites by snakes. In cultures where women are restricted from being in public places, by law or custom, women who break such restrictions often face violence.

=== Forced pregnancy ===
Forced pregnancy is the practice of forcing a woman or girl to become pregnant. A common motivation is to help establish a forced marriage, including by means of bride kidnapping. This was also used as part of a program of breeding slaves (see Slave breeding in the United States). In the 20th century, state mandated forced marriage with the aim of increasing the population was practiced by some authoritarian governments, notably during the Khmer Rouge regime in Cambodia, which systematically forced people into marriages, ordering them to have children, in order to increase the population and continue the revolution.

The issue of forced continuation of pregnancy (i.e. denying a woman safe and legal abortion) is also seen by some organizations as a violation of women's rights. For example, the Committee on the Elimination of Discrimination against Women considers the criminalization of abortion a "violations of women's sexual and reproductive health and rights" and a form of "gender based violence".

In addition, in some parts of Latin America, with very strict anti-abortion laws, pregnant women avoid the medical system due to fear of being investigated by the authorities if they have a miscarriage, or a stillbirth, or other problems with the pregnancy. Prosecuting such women is quite common in places such as El Salvador.

=== Forced sterilization and forced abortion ===
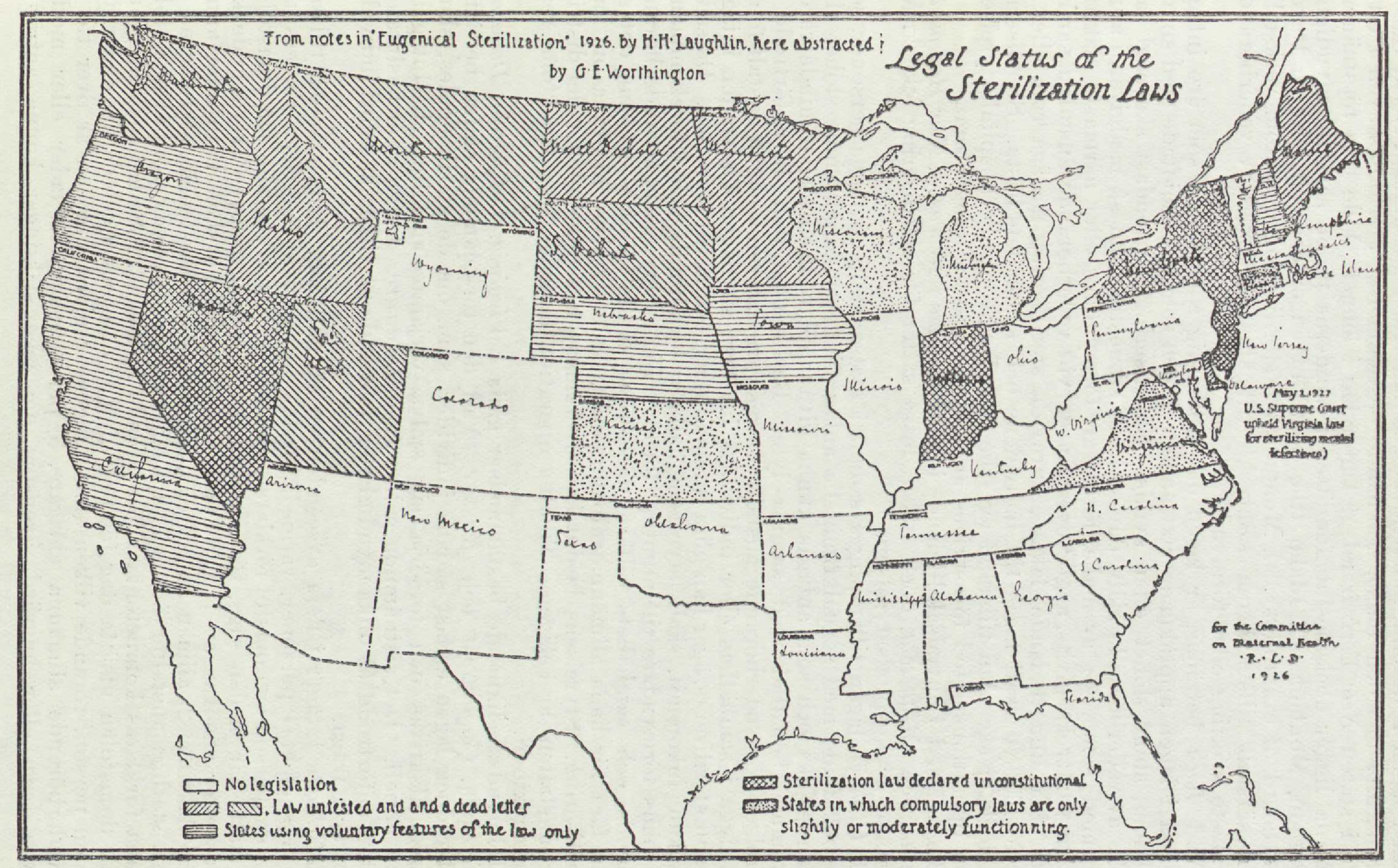
A map from a 1929 Swedish royal commission report displays the U.S. states that had implemented sterilization legislation by then

Forced sterilization and forced abortion are considered forms of gender-based violence. The Istanbul Convention prohibits forced abortion and forced sterilization. According to the Convention on the Elimination of all forms of Discrimination Against Women, all "women are guaranteed the right to decide freely and responsibly on the number of and spacing of their children, and to have access to information, education, and means to enable them to exercise these rights."

Studies show forced sterilizations often target socially and politically disadvantaged groups such as racial and ethnic minorities, the poor, and indigenous populations. In the United States, much of the history of forced sterilization is connected to the legacy of eugenics and racism in the United States. Many doctors thought that they were doing the country a service by sterilizing women who were poor, disabled, or a minority; the doctors considered those women to be a drain on the system. Native American, Mexican American, African American and Puerto Rican-American women were coerced into sterilization programs, with Native Americans and African Americans especially being targeted. Records have shown that Native American girls as young as eleven years-old had hysterectomy operations performed.

In Europe, there have been a number of lawsuits and accusations towards the Czech Republic and Slovakia of sterilizing Roma women without adequate information and waiting period. In response, both nations have instituted a mandatory seven-day waiting period and written consent. Slovakia has been condemned on the issue of forced sterilization of Roma women several times by the European Court for Human Rights (see V. C. vs. Slovakia, N. B. vs. Slovakia and I.G. and Others vs. Slovakia).

In Peru, in 1995, Alberto Fujimori launched a family planning initiative that especially targeted poor and indigenous women. In total, over 215,000 women were sterilized, with over 200,000 believed to have been coerced. In 2002, Health Minister Fernando Carbone admitted that the government gave misleading information, offered food incentives, and threatened to fine parents if they had additional children. The procedures have also been found to have been negligent, with less than half using proper anesthetic.

In China, the one child policy included forced abortions and forced sterilization. Forced sterilization is also practiced in Uzbekistan.

== Women-specific state restrictions ==
=== Dress ===
In Iran, since 1981, after the Islamic Revolution, all women are required to wear loose-fitting clothing and a headscarf in public. In 1983, the Islamic Consultative Assembly decided that women who do not cover their hair in public will be punished with 74 lashes. Since 1995, unveiled women can also be imprisoned for up to 60 days. The Iranian protests against compulsory hijab continued into the September 2022 Iranian protests, triggered in response to the killing of Mahsa Amini, who was allegedly beaten to death by police due to wearing an "improper hijab". In Saudi Arabia, after the Grand Mosque seizure of 1979, it became mandatory for women to veil in public but this is no longer required since 2018. In Afghanistan, since May 2022, women are required to wear a hijab and face covering in public. In countries without mandatory hijab women can face harassment and victim blaming due to not wearing a hijab.

The hijab has seen bans in places such as Austria, Yugoslavia, Kosovo, Kazakhstan, the Soviet Union, and Tunisia. On 8 January 1936, Reza Shah issued a decree, Kashf-e hijab, banning all veils. To enforce this decree, the police were ordered to physically remove the veil from any woman who wore it in public. Women who refused were beaten, their headscarves and chadors torn off, and their homes forcibly searched.

=== Freedom of movement ===
Women are, in many parts of the world, severely restricted in their freedom of movement. Freedom of movement is an essential right, recognized by international instruments, including Article 15 (4) of CEDAW. Nevertheless, in some countries, women are not legally allowed to leave home without a male guardian (male relative or husband). Saudi Arabia was the only country in the world where women were forbidden to drive motor vehicles until June 2018.

=== Sexuality ===
Sex crimes such as adultery and sex outside marriage are disproportionately levelled against women and the punishment is often stoning and flogging. This has been seen in Iran, Saudi Arabia, Sudan, Pakistan, Yemen, the United Arab Emirates, and some states in Nigeria. Additionally this can deter victims of sexual violence from reporting the crime, because the victims may themselves be punished (if they cannot prove their case, if they are deemed to have been in the company of an unrelated male, or if they were unmarried and not virgins at the time of the rape). Another aspect is the denial of medical care often occurs with regard to reproductive and sexual health. Sometimes women themselves avoid the medical system for fear of being reported to the police or facing family violence due to having premarital sex or being the victims of sexual violence.

== Violence in specific areas ==
=== Physical violence ===
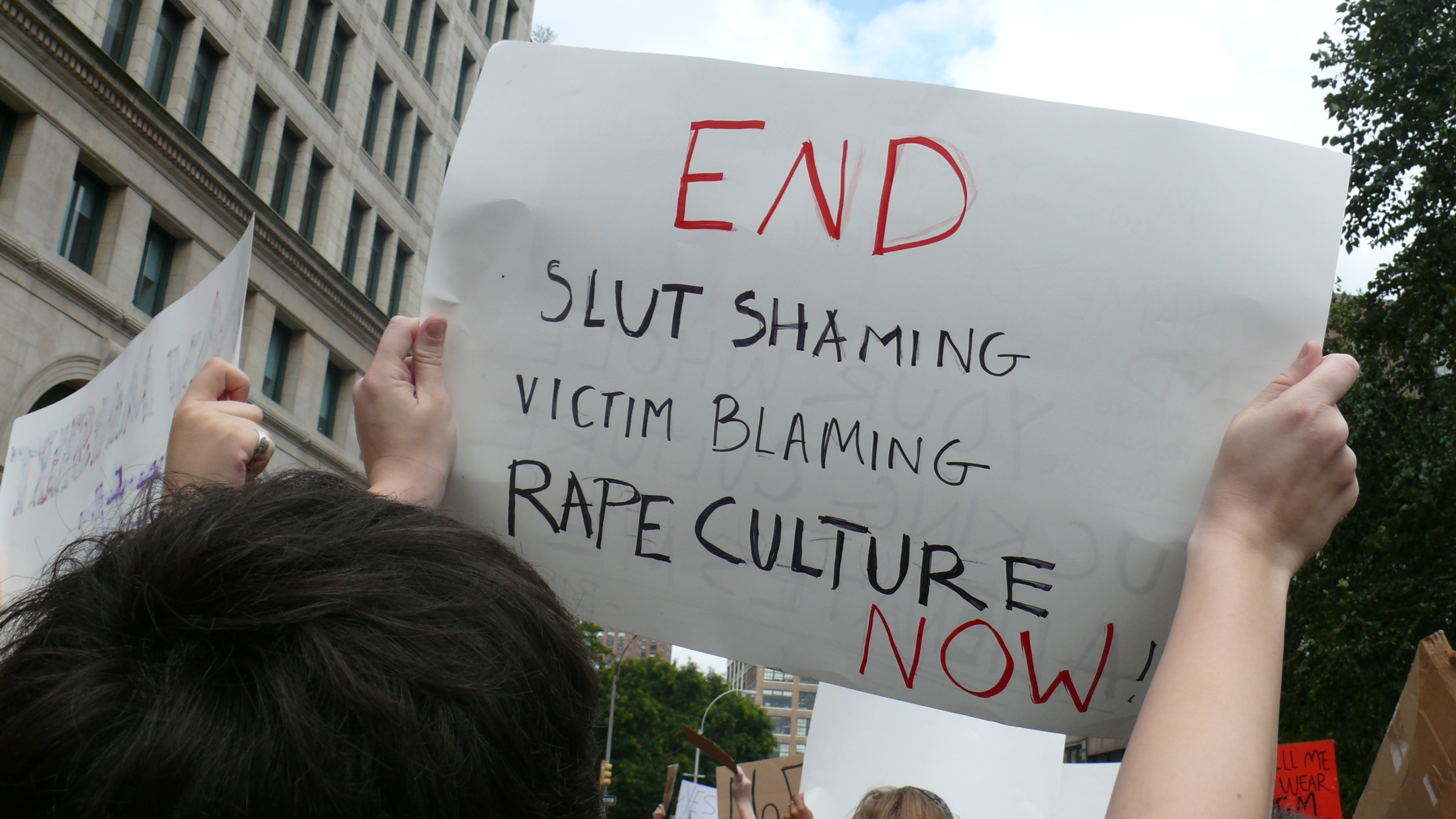
Slut shaming is a common form of semiotic violence against women in politics.

==== Politics ====
Violence Against Women in Politics (VAWP) is the act or threat of physical, emotional or psychological violence against female politicians on the basis of their gender, most often with the intent of discouraging the victims and other female politicians from participating in the political process. VAWP has been growing in significance among the fields of gendered political science and feminist political theory studies. The main intent behind creating a separate category that is distinct from Violence Against Women, is to highlight the barriers faced by women who work in politics, or wish to pursue a career in the political realm. VAWP is unique from Violence Against Women in three important ways: victims are targeted because of their gender; the violence itself can be gendered (i.e., sexism, sexual violence); the primary goal is to deter women from participating in politics (including but not limited to voting, running for office, campaigning, etc.). It is also important to distinguish VAWP from political violence, which is defined by the use or threats of force to reach political ends, and can be experienced by all politicians.

While women's participation in national parliaments has been increasing, rising from 11% in 1995 to 26.5% in 2023, there is still a large disparity between male and female representation in governmental politics. Expanding women's participation in government is a crucial goal for many countries, as female politicians have proven invaluable with respect to bringing certain issues to the forefront, such as elimination of gender-based violence, parental leave and childcare, pensions, gender-equality laws, electoral reform, and providing fresh perspectives on numerous policy areas that have typically remained a male-dominated realm. In order to increase women's participation in an effective manner, the importance of recognizing the issues related to VAWP and making every effort to provide the necessary resources to victims and condemn any and all hostile behaviour in political institutions cannot be understated. Experiencing VAWP can dissuade women from remaining in politics (and lead to an early exit from their career or from aspiring higher political office. Witnessing women in politics experience VAWP can serve as one of many deterrents for aspirants to run for office and for candidates to continue campaigning.

Acts of violence or harassment are often not deemed to be gendered when they are reported, if they are reported at all. VAWP is often dismissed as "the cost of doing politics" and reporting can be seen as "political suicide", which contributes to the normalization of VAWP. This ambiguity results in a lack of information regarding attacks and makes the issue appear to be relatively commonplace. While it is reported that women in politics are more often targeted by violence than their male counterparts, the specific cause is often not reported as a gendered crime. This makes it more difficult to pinpoint where the links between gender-specific violence and political violence really are. In many countries, the practice of electoral politics is traditionally considered to be a masculine domain.

The history of male dominated politics has allowed some male politicians to believe they have a right to participate in politics while women should not, since women's participation is a threat to the social order. Women in positions of power are thus more likely than their male counterparts to receive threats and experience violence. As one professor of sociology, Marie E. Berry, wrote: "as women are trained and encouraged to vie for these seats, they risk taking power (and resources) that male politicians see as rightfully theirs, opening them up to the risk of violence and other efforts to limit the effectiveness of their campaigns."

48% of electoral violence against women is against supporters, this is most likely the largest percentage as it has the largest amount of the public participating. 9% of electoral violence against women is targeting candidates, while 22% targets female voters. This means that women who are directly acting in politics are likely to face some form of violence, whether physical or emotional. Regarding violence against female politicians, younger women and those with intersecting identities, particularly racial and ethnic minorities, are more likely to be targets. Female politicians who outwardly express and act from feminist perspectives are also more likely to be victimized.

===== Sub-types =====
Gabrielle Bardell's 2011 report "Breaking the mold: Understanding Gender and Electoral Violence" was one of the first documents published that showed examples and figures for how women are intimidated and attacked in politics. Since Bardall's report, other scholars have conducted further research on the topic. Notably, Mona Lena Krook's work on VAWP introduced 5 forms of violence and harassment: physical, sexual, psychological, economic, and semiotic/symbolic. Physical violence encompasses inflicting, or attempting to inflict, bodily harm and injury. While physical violence is the most easily identified form, it is actually the least common type. Sexual violence involves (attempts at) sexual acts through coercion, including unwanted sexual comments, advances, and harassment. Psychological violence includes causing emotional and mental damage through means of death/rape threats, stalking, etc.

Economic violence involves denying, withholding, and controlling female politicians' access to financial resources, particularly regarding campaigns. Semiotic or symbolic violence, the most abstract subtype of VAWP, refers to the erasure of female politicians through degrading images and sexist language. Krook theorizes that semiotic violence against women in politics works in two related ways: rendering women invisible and rendering women incompetent. By symbolically removing women from the public political sphere, semiotic violence renders women invisible. Examples include using masculine grammar when speaking about and to political women, interrupting female politicians, and not portraying political women in the media. By highlighting the role incongruity between stereotypically feminine attributes (e.g., warm, polite, submissive), and traits typically ascribed to good leaders (e.g., strong, powerful, assertive), semiotic violence emphasizes that women are incompetent to be political actors. This form of semiotic violence can manifest through denying and minimizing women's political qualifications, sexual objectification, and labeling political women as emotional, among other actions.

==== Higher education ====
Sexual violence on college campuses is considered a major problem in the United States. According to the conclusion of a major Campus Sexual Assault (CSA) Study: "The CSA Study data suggest women at universities are at considerable risk for experiencing sexual assault."

==== Sports ====
Sport-related violence against women is any physical, sexual, mental acts that are "perpetrated by both male athletes and by male fans or consumers of sport and sporting events, as well as by coaches of female athletes". The documenting reports and literature suggest that there are obvious connections between contemporary sport and violence against women. Such events as the 2010 World Cup, the Olympic and Commonwealth Games "have highlighted the connections between sports spectatorship and intimate partner violence, and the need for police, authorities and services to be aware of this when planning sporting events". Sport-related violence occurs in various contexts and places, including homes, pubs, clubs, hotel rooms, the streets.

Violence against women is a topic of concern in the United States' collegiate athletic community. From the 2010 UVA lacrosse murder, in which a male athlete was charged guilty with second degree murder of his girlfriend, to the 2004 University of Colorado Football Scandal when players were charged with nine alleged sexual assaults, studies suggest that athletes are at higher risk for committing sexual assault against women than the average student. It is reported that one in three college assaults are committed by athletes. Surveys suggest that male student athletes who represent 3.3% of the college population, commit 19% of reported sexual assaults and 35% of domestic violence. The theories that surround these statistics range from misrepresentation of the student-athlete to an unhealthy mentality towards women within the team itself. Sociologist Timothy Curry, after conducting an observational analysis of two big time sports' locker room conversations, deduced that the high risk of male student athletes for gender abuse is a result of the team's subculture. Curry states, "Their locker room talk generally treated women as objects, encouraged sexist attitudes toward women and, in its extreme, promoted rape culture." He proposes that this objectification is a way for the male to reaffirm his heterosexual status and hyper-masculinity. Claims have been made that the atmosphere changes when outsiders (especially women) intrude in the locker room.

In the wake of the reporter Lisa Olson being harassed by a Patriots player in the locker room in 1990, she said, "We are taught to think we must have done something wrong and it took me a while to realize I hadn't done anything wrong." Other female sports reporters (college and professional) have said that they often brush off the players' comments, which leads to further objectification. Some sociologists challenge this assertion. Steve Chandler says that because of their celebrity status on campus, "athletes are more likely to be scrutinized or falsely accused than non-athletes." Stephanie Mak says that "if one considers the 1998 estimates that about three million women were battered and almost one million raped, the proportion of incidences that involve athletes in comparison to the regular population is relatively small."

In response to the proposed link between college athletes and gender-based violence, and media coverage holding universities as responsible for these scandals more universities are requiring athletes to attend workshops that promote awareness. Other groups, such as the National Coalition Against Violent Athletes, have formed to provide support for the victims.

==== Military ====
A 1995 study of female war veterans found that 90 percent had been sexually harassed. A 2003 survey found that 30 percent of female vets said they were raped in the military and a 2004 study of veterans who were seeking help for post-traumatic stress disorder found that 71 percent of the women said they were sexually assaulted or raped while serving.

In 2021, The New York Times reported that about one in four women in the military had experienced sexual assault. Until the end of 2023, these reports went through the service member's chain-of-command, and many women reported that their reports were dismissed without due process and/or resulted in professional reprisal, ostracism, or other maltreatment. Beginning in December 2023, however, sexual assault reports are handled outside of the chain-of-command, hopefully reducing biases in the process of investigation.

=== Online ===
==== Cyberbullying ====
Cyberbullying is a form of intimidation using electronic forms of contact. In the 21st century, cyberbullying has become increasingly common, especially among teenagers in Western countries. Almost 75% of women have encountered harassment and threats of violence online, known as cyber violence, as reported by the United Nations Broadband Commission in 2015. Misogynistic rhetoric is prevalent online, and the public debate over gender-based attacks has increased significantly, leading to calls for policy interventions and better responses by social networks like Facebook and Twitter. Some specialists have argued that gendered online attacks should be given particular attention within the wider category of hate speech. Abusers quickly identified opportunities online to humiliate their victims, destroy their careers, reputations and relationships, and even drive them to suicide or "trigger so-called 'honor' violence in societies where sex outside of marriage is seen as bringing shame on a family". According to a poll conducted by Amnesty International in 2018 across 8 countries, 23% of women have experienced online abuse of harassment. These are often sexist or misogynistic in nature and include direct of indirect threats of physical or sexual violence, abuse targeting aspects of their personality and privacy violations. According to Human Rights Watch, 90% of those who experienced sexual violence online in 2019 were women and girls.

==== Journalists ====
According to UNESCO, women journalists in prominent and visible positions tend to attract more online abuse. In their survey of 901 journalists, nearly three quarters (73%) said they had experienced online violence. In another survey by The Guardian that looked at comments received on articles, women writers were 4 times more likely to be abused compared to their male counterparts. This is a trend that is persistent across geography - in the Netherlands, 82% of the 300 female journalists surveyed in 2022 said they encountered abuse online.

==== Generative AI ====
Generative AI can lead to an increase in the number of attackers, the creation of sustained and automated attacks and the generation of content such as posts, texts, and emails that are written convincingly from multiple 'voices'. This makes existing harms such as hate speech, cyber harassment, misinformation, and impersonation - all of which rank in the top five most common vectors of technology-facilitated gender-based violence - have a much wider reach and be more dangerous.

==== Video games ====
Video games with graphically sexual content have been criticized by scholars for promoting the indecent portrayal of women. Games like now banned RapeLay, Custer's Revenge, and Grand Theft Auto incorporate the objectification of women within their plot lines to attract more players, majority of whom are male, but perpetuate a culture of exaggerated gender stereotypes and toxic masculinity. A study found that 21% of video games feature violence against women. An additional study has shown that players of these violent and sexual video games often have more accepting attitudes to rape, also known as rape myth acceptance, as the hyperrealism when playing these video games results in a difficult differentiation between the digital and real world.

== Effect on society ==
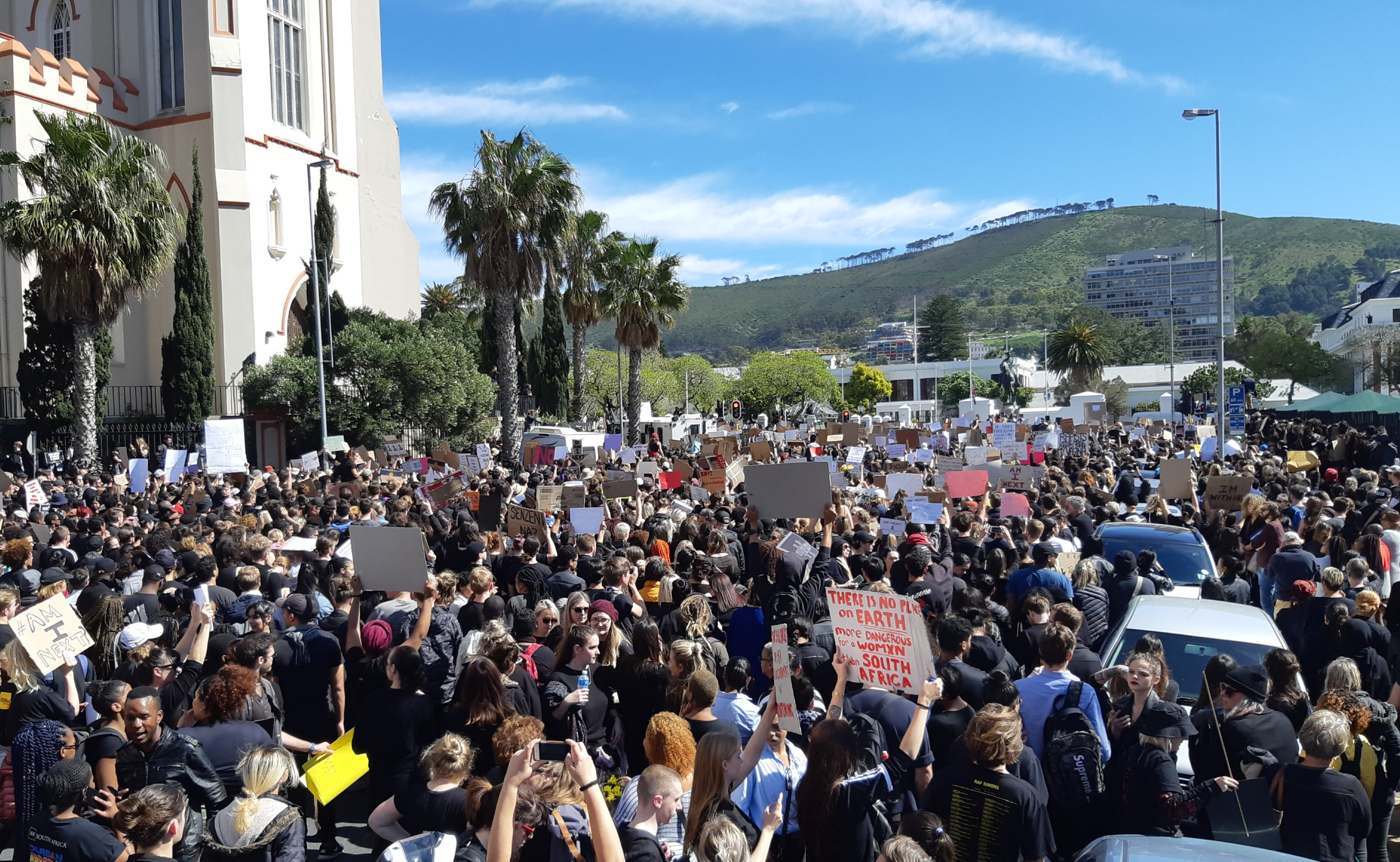
Demonstration against femicide in Cape Town, South Africa following the murder of Uyinene Mrwetyana, 2019

According to an article published in the Health and Human Rights journal, regardless of many years of advocacy and involvement of many feminist activist organizations, the issue of violence against women still "remains one of the most pervasive forms of human rights violations worldwide". The violence against women can occur in both public and private spheres of life and at any time of their life span. Violence against women often keeps women from wholly contributing to social, economic, and political development of their communities. Many women are terrified by these threats of violence and this essentially influences their lives so that they are impeded to exercise their human rights; for instance, they fear contributing to the development of their communities socially, economically, and politically.

Most often, violence against women has been framed as a health issue, and also as a violation of human rights. The research seems to provide convincing evidence that violence against women is a severe and pervasive problem the world over, with devastating effects on the health and well-being of women and children. Importantly, other than the issue of social divisions, gendered violence can also extend into the realm of health issues and become a direct concern of the public health sector. A health issue such as HIV/AIDS is another cause that also leads to violence. Women who have an HIV/AIDS infection are also among the targets of the violence. The World Health Organization (WHO) reports that violence against women puts an undue burden on health care services, as women who have suffered violence are more likely to need health services and at higher cost, compared to women who have not suffered violence. The Council of Europe describes violence against women in private sphere, at home or domestic violence, as the main reason of "death and disability" among the women who encountered violence.

In addition, several studies have shown a link between poor treatment of women and international violence. These studies show that one of the best predictors of inter- and intranational violence is the maltreatment of women in the society.

== Prevalence and extent ==
According to the UN, "there is no region of the world, no country and no culture in which women's freedom from violence has been secured." Several forms of violence are more prevalent in certain parts of the world, often in developing countries. For example, dowry violence and bride burning is associated with India, Bangladesh, and Nepal. Acid throwing is also associated with these countries, as well as in Southeast Asia, including Cambodia. Honor killing is associated with the Middle East and South Asia. Female genital mutilation is found mostly in Africa, and to a lesser extent in the Middle East and some other parts of Asia. Marriage by abduction is found in Ethiopia, Central Asia, and the Caucasus. Abuse related to payment of bride price (such as violence, trafficking, and forced marriage) is linked to parts of Sub-Saharan Africa and Oceania (also see Lobolo).

A study in 2002 estimated that at least one in five women in the world had been physically or sexually abused by a man sometime in their lives, and "gender-based violence accounts for as much death and ill-health in women aged 15–44 years as cancer, and is a greater cause of ill-health than malaria and traffic accidents combined."

A 2007 survey by the National Institute of Justice found that 19.0% of college women and 6.1% of college men experienced either sexual assault or attempted sexual assault since entering college. In the University of Pennsylvania Law Review in 2017, D. Tuerkheimer reviewed the literature on rape allegations, and reported on the problems surrounding the credibility of rape victims, and how that relates to false rape accusations. She pointed to national survey data from the Centers for Disease Control and Prevention that indicates 1 in every 5 women (and 1 in 71 men) will be raped during their lifetime. Despite the prevalence of rape and the fact that false rape allegations are rare, Tuerkheimer reported that law enforcement officers often default to disbelief about an alleged rape. This documented prejudice leads to reduced investigation and criminal justice outcomes that are faulty compared to other crimes. Tuerkheimer says that women face "credibility discounts" at all stages of the justice system, including from police, jurors, judges, and prosecutors. These credibility discounts are especially pronounced when the victim is acquainted with the accuser, and the vast majority of rapes fall into this category. The U.S. Department of Justice estimated from 2005 to 2007 that about 2% of victims who were raped while incapacitated (from drugs, alcohol, or other reasons) reported the rape to the police, compared to 13% of victims who experienced physically forced sexual assault.

Many kinds of violence against women (specifically rape, sexual assault, and domestic violence) are under-reported, often due to societal norms, taboos, stigma, and the sensitive nature of the subject. It is widely recognized that, even today, a lack of reliable and continuous data is an obstacle to forming a clear picture of violence against women.

== Demographics ==
Acts of violence against women are often not unique episodes, but are ongoing over time. More often than not, the violence is perpetrated by someone the woman knows, not by a stranger.

=== High risk groups ===
==== Indigenous people ====
Indigenous women are often targets of physical violence, including sexual assault. Many Indigenous communities are rural, with few resources and little help from the government or non-state actors. They often have strained relationships with law enforcement, making prosecution difficult. Many Indigenous societies find themselves at the center of land disputes between nations and ethnic groups, resulting in these communities sometimes bearing the brunt of national and ethnic conflicts.

Violence is often perpetrated by the state, such as in Peru, in the 1990s. President Alberto Fujimori has been accused of genocide and crimes against humanity as a result of a forced sterilization program. Fujimori put in place a program against Indigenous people (mainly the Quechuas and the Aymaras), in the name of a "public health plan", in 1995.

Many countries have higher rates of violence against Indigenous women than non‐Indigenous women. This includes Bolivia, which has the highest rate of domestic violence in Latin America; and Canada, where violence against women is falling, except for Indigenous populations. Guatemalan Indigenous women have faced extensive violence. Throughout three decades of conflict, Maya women and girls have continued to be targeted.

The concept of white dominion over indigenous women's bodies has been rooted in American history since the beginning of colonization. The theory of Manifest destiny went beyond simple land extension and into the belief that European settlers had the right to exploit Native women's bodies as a method of taming and "humanizing" them. In the US, Native American women are more than twice as likely to experience violence than any other demographic. One in three Native women is sexually assaulted, and 67% of these assaults are perpetrated by non-Natives, with Native Americans, including those of more than one race, constituting 2% of U.S. population in 2014. The disproportionate rate of assault is due to a variety of causes, including the historical legal inability of tribes to prosecute on their own on the reservation. The federal Violence Against Women Act was reauthorized in 2013, which for the first time gave tribes jurisdiction to investigate and prosecute felony domestic violence offenses involving Native American and non-Native offenders on the reservation, as 26% of Natives live on reservations. In 2019 the Democrat House passed the Violence Against Women Reauthorization Act of 2019, which increased tribes' prosecution rights further. However, in the Republican Senate its progress stalled.

==== Immigrants and refugees ====
Immigrant and refugee women often face violence, both in the private sphere (by partners and other family members) and in the public sphere (by the police and other authorities). These women are often in a vulnerable position: they do not speak the language of the country they are in, they do not know its laws, and sometimes they are in a legal position where they may be deported if they make contact with the authorities. Women who seek protection from armed conflict in their countries of origin often face more violence while travelling to the destination country or when they arrive there. Women refugees face violence from both the journey facilitator and the detention center guards. Journey facilitator rapes occur in exchange for money for their passage, whereas male guards sexually violate in exchange for faster processing of the refugee case.

==== Transgender women ====
Transgender women, especially transgender women of color, are at higher risk of experiencing violence than cisgender women. Trans women commonly experience intimate partner violence, with one study finding that 31.1% of trans people experience it, and another finding that half of all trans women experience it. Trans women also often face abuse by police, and transgender sex workers often face violence from clients. Trans women who are survivors of violence can have a harder time finding domestic violence shelters, as some shelters do not accept them. In 2018, more than two dozen transgender people were violently killed in the United States, most of them women of color.

== Activism ==
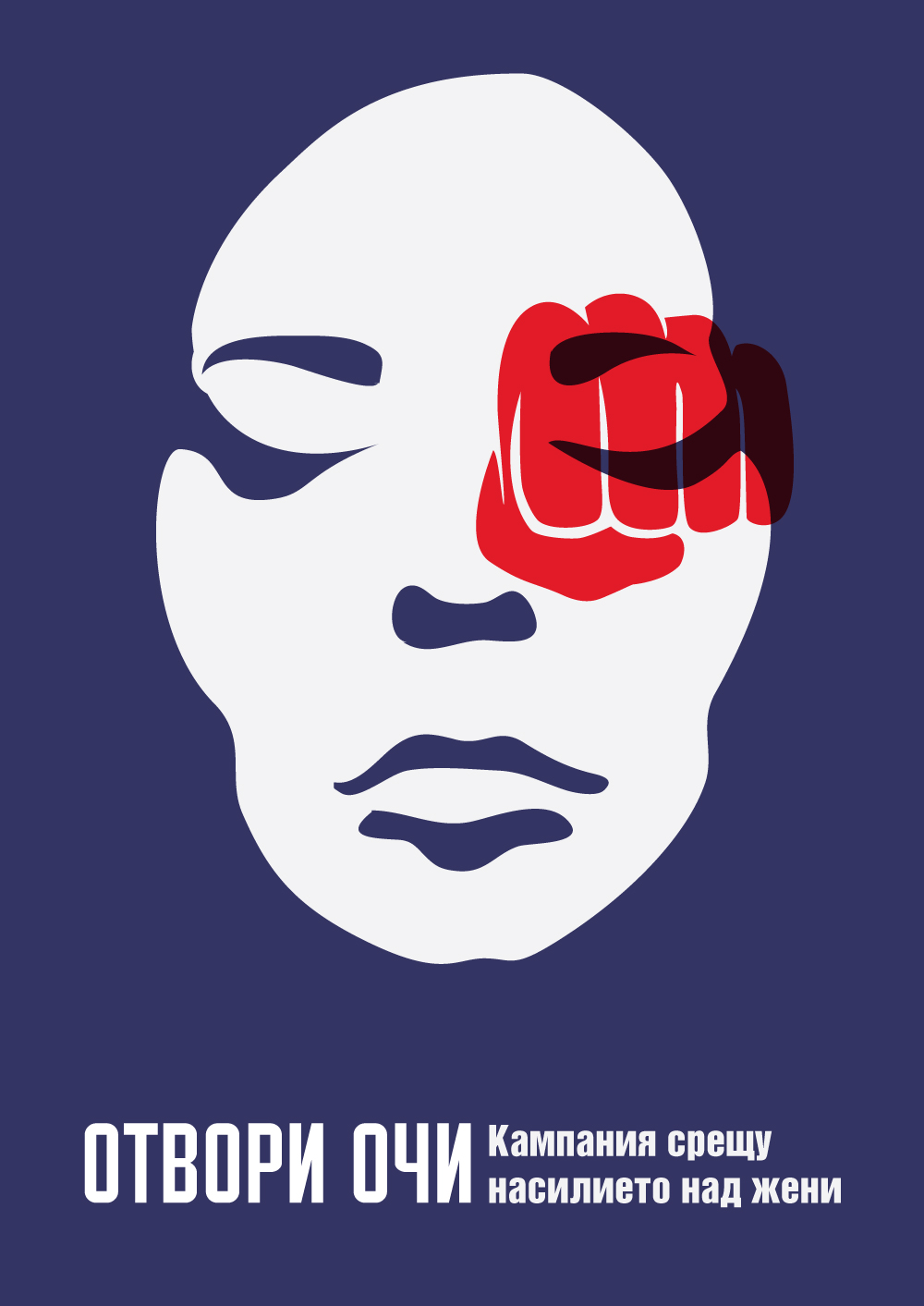
A Bulgarian poster urging people to open their eyes about domestic violence against women

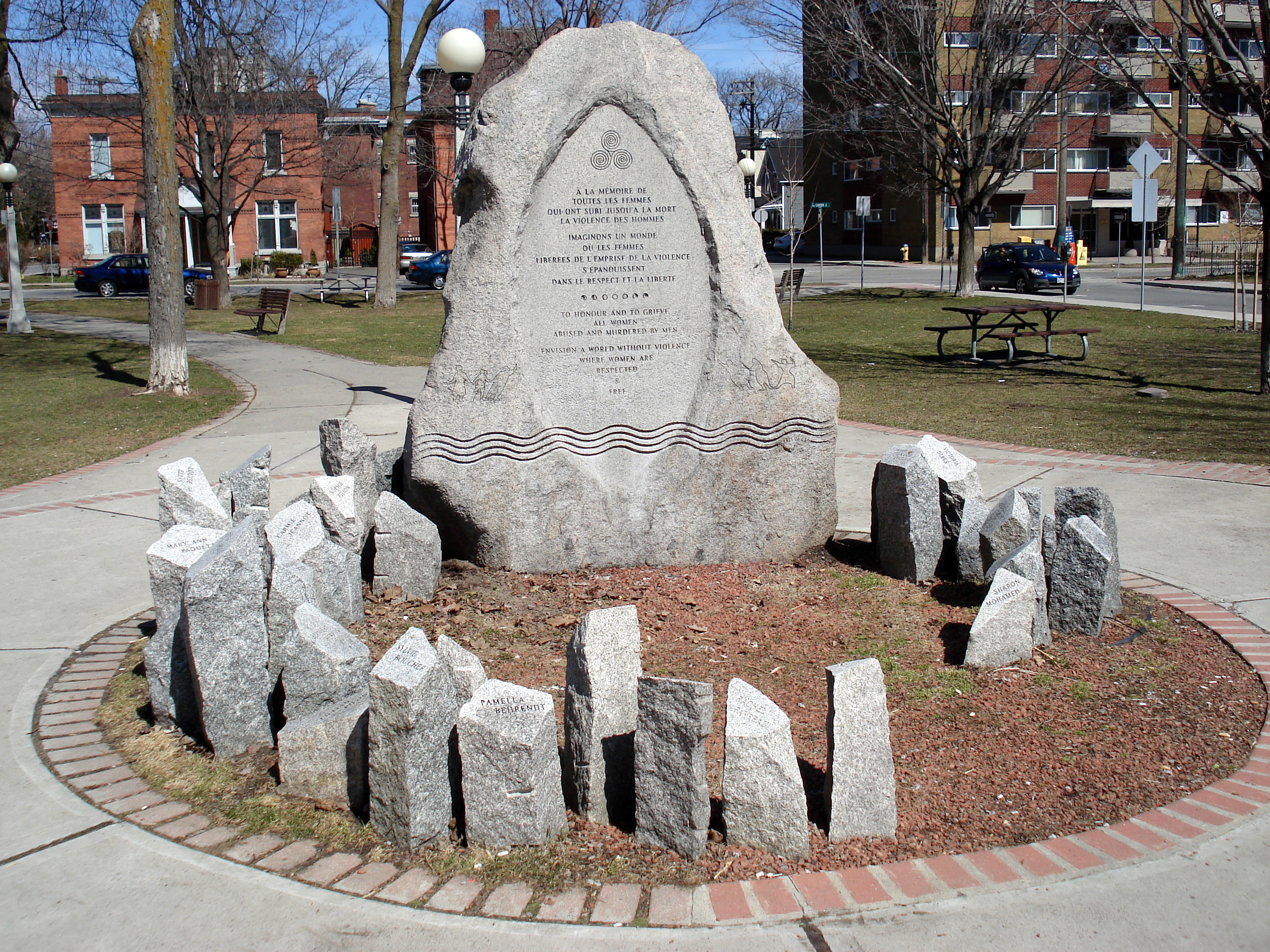
Memorial in Minto Park, Ottawa, of the victims of the École Polytechnique massacre

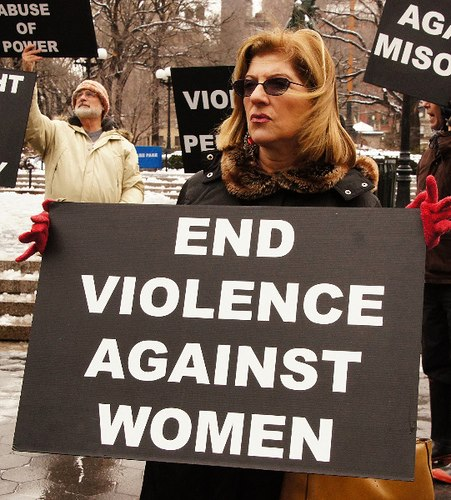
Protest to end violence against women

In the activism for violence against women, the objectives are to address and draw public attention on the issues of VAW, as well as seek and recommend measures to prevent and eliminate this violence. Many scholarly articles suggest that the VAW is considered a violation of human rights as well as a "public health issue".

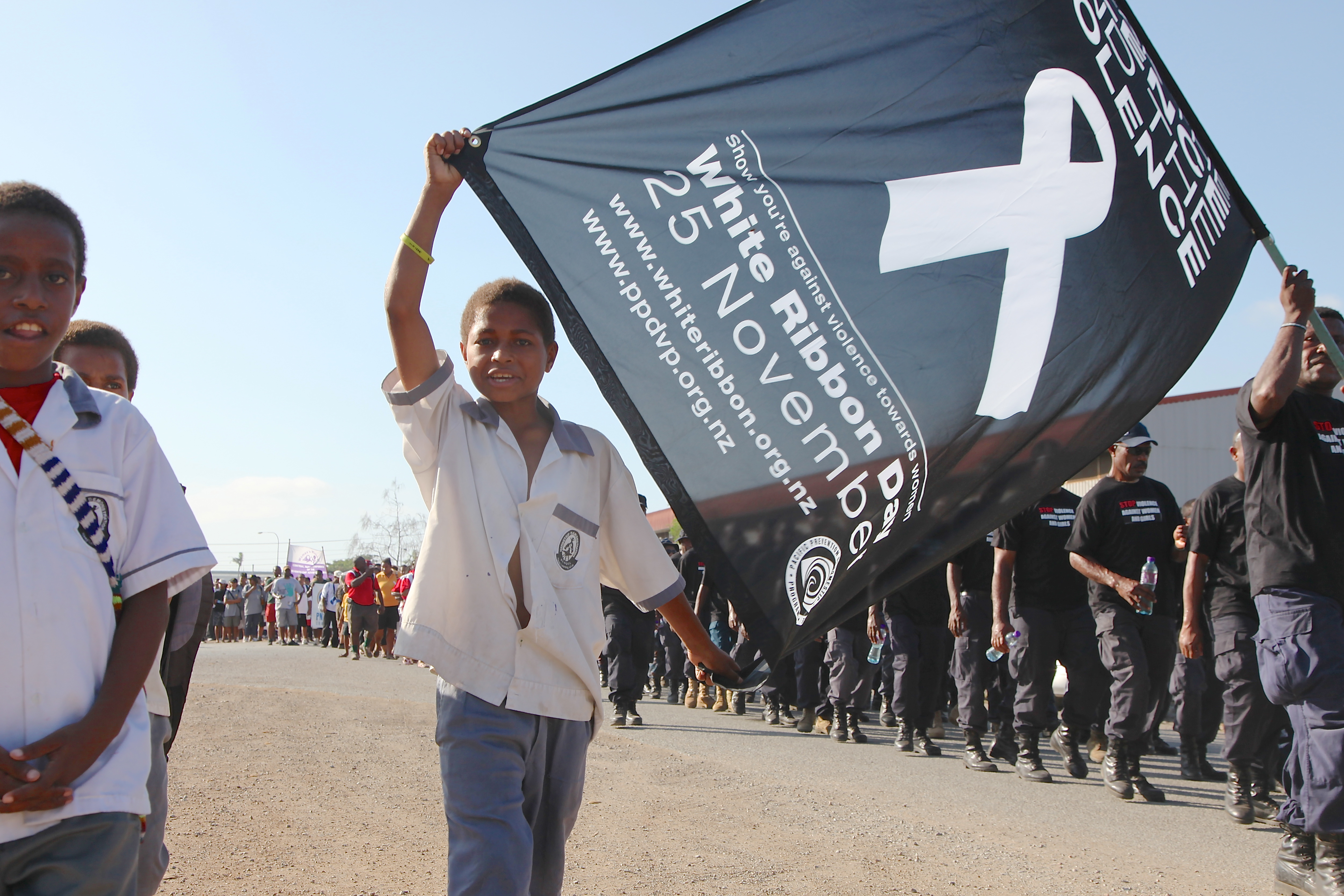
Papua New Guineans show their support for putting an end to violence against women during a White Ribbon Day march.

The VAW movement was initiated in the 1970s, when some feminist movements started to bring the discussion on the issue of violence into the feminist discourse and many other groups, on the national as well as international levels, attempted to push for the betterment of women through lobbying of the state officials and delegates, demanding conferences on 'gender issues'.

On 14 November 2026, several hundred men assembled outside the Swiss parliament building in Bern to demonstrate against misogyny and violence against women. The rally, titled "Men Against Violence Against Women," was co-organized by social worker Christoph Gosteli and an organization known as maenner. Organizers urged men to take a more active role in confronting misogyny and in efforts to prevent violence against women.

=== Levels of activist movements ===
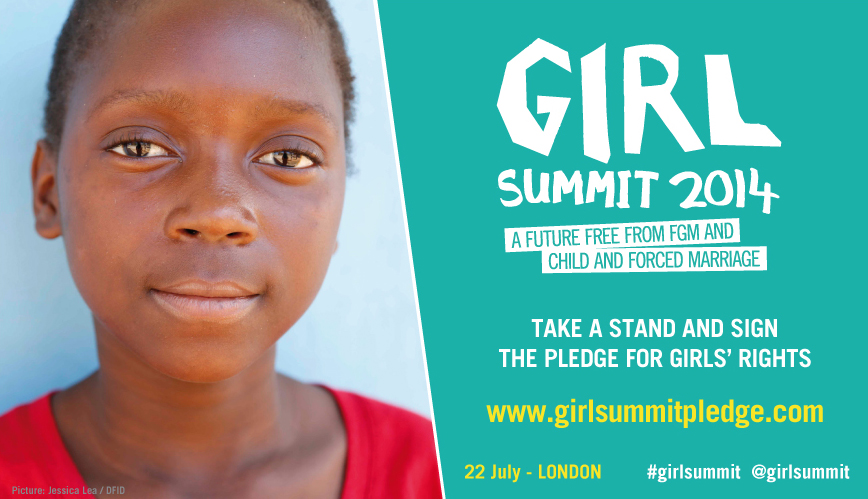
Poster against child and forced marriage

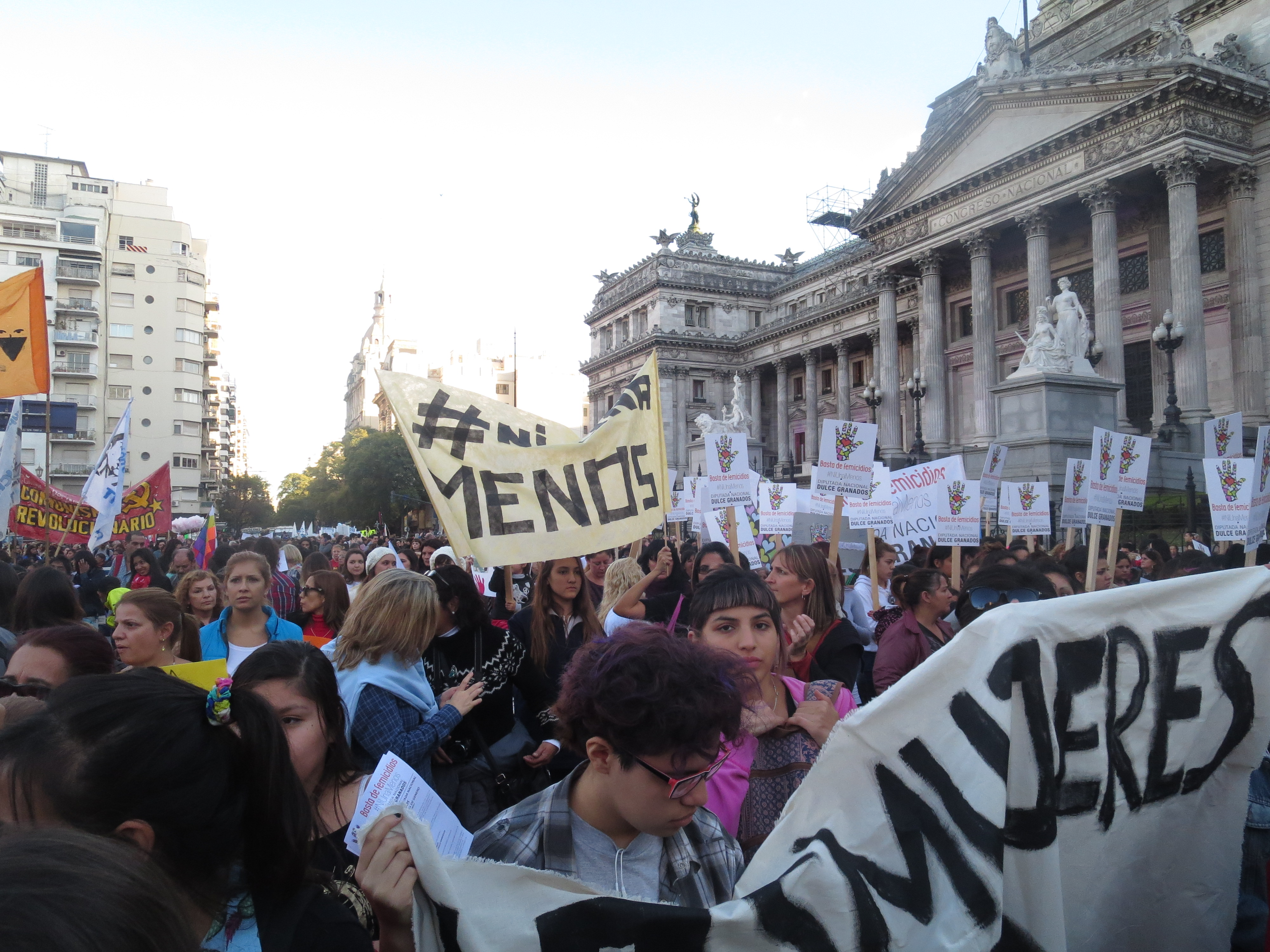
Mass protest against violence against women in Buenos Aires in 2015

On the local or national level, the VAW movements are diverse and differ in their strategic program of intervention. The strategies used in a number of the movements focus on the individual level with the emphases on individuals, relationships and family. Also, many of them take the 'preventive' as an approach to tackle the issues on the ground by encouraging people to "reexamine their attitudes and beliefs" in order to trigger and create fundamental changes in these "deep-rooted beliefs and behaviors". To achieve the objectives of the movement, many activists and scholars argue that they have to initiate changes in cultural attitudes and norms on a communal level.

On the transnational or regional level, the anti-violence movements also deploy different strategies based on the specificities of their cultures and beliefs in their particular regions. On this level, the activist movements are known as "transnational feminist networks" or TFNs. TFNs have a significant effect, like the autonomous movements on the national level, in shaping policies, as well pushing for the recognition and inclusion of language of VAW in the United Nations human rights mechanisms: the international human rights agreements. Their activities are ranging from lobbying the policy makers; organizing demonstrations on the local and regional levels; to creating institutional pressure that could push for changes in the international institutional measures.

On an international level, the movements that advocate for women's rights and against VAW are the mixture of (civil society) actors from domestic and regional levels. The objectives of these VAW movements focus on "creating shared expectations" within the domestic and regional levels as well as "mobilizing numbers of domestic civil society" to create "standards in global civil society". The global women's movement works to transform numbers of international conventions and conferences to "a conference on women's rights" by pushing for a "stronger language and clearer recognition" of VAW issues. In addition, the United Nations also plays a vital role in promoting and campaigning for the VAW movements on the international level.

The United Nations Sustainable Development Goal 5 is also a global initiative with a target to eliminate all forms of violence against women. In recent years, there has been a trend of approaching VAW at an international level through means such as conventions or, in the European Union, through directives (such as the directive against sexual harassment, and the directive against human trafficking).

=== Second order sexual harassment (SOSH) ===
Second-order sexual harassment (SOSH) is the harassment suffered by those who stand with and support victims of violence against women (VAW). In 2013 the UN General Assembly passed its first resolution calling for the protection of defenders of women's human rights. The resolution urges states to put in place gender-specific laws and policies for the protection of women's human rights defenders and to ensure that defenders themselves are involved in the design and implementation of these measures, and calls on states to protect women's human rights defenders from reprisals for cooperating with the UN and to ensure their unhindered access to and communication with international human rights bodies and mechanisms.

== Legal enforcement ==
As violence is often committed by a family member, women first started by lobbying their governments to set up shelters for domestic violence survivors. The Julia Burgos Protected House established in Puerto Rico in 1979 was the first shelter in Latin America and the Caribbean for "battered women". In 2003, 18 out of the 20 countries in the region had legislation on domestic or family violence, and 11 countries addressed sexual violence in their laws. Legislative measures to protect victims can include restraining orders, which can be found in Colombia, El Salvador, Guatemala, Paraguay, Venezuela, Turkey, the United States and many western European countries for instance.

Courts can also be allowed by law (Germany, 2001) to order the perpetrator to leave the home so that victims do not have to seek shelter. Countries were urged to repeal discriminatory legislation by 2005 following the review of the Beijing Declaration and Platform for Action in 2000. Egypt, for instance, abolished a law that exempted men from rape charges when marrying their victims. However, the goal of antiviolence legislation is often to keep the families together, regardless of the best interests of women, which perpetuate domestic violence.

=== Challenges faced by women in accessing justice and limitations of measures ===
There can be a de jure or de facto acceptance of violent behavior and lack of remedies for victims.

- Lack of criminalization: in many places, acts of abuse, especially acts such as female genital mutilation, marital rape, forced marriage and child marriage, are not criminalized, or are illegal but widely tolerated, with the laws against them being rarely enforced. There are instances where crimes against women are also categorized as minor offenses.
- Lack of awareness of the existing laws: in many places, although there are laws against violence on the books, many women do not know of their existence. This is especially the case with marital rape – its criminalization being very recent in most countries.
- Challenges in making a case in court: the burden of proof can be placed on the victim. For instance in the Philippines, before a change in law in 1997, rape used to be described as a crime against chastity; and virginity played an important role in court. In various countries, such as Bangladesh, a woman's past sexual experience continues to be very important in a case of rape. Bangladesh has received criticism for its employment of the "two-finger test" in rape investigations. This test consists in a physical examination of women who report rape during which a doctor inserts two fingers in the woman's vagina to determine whether the woman is "habituated to sex". This examination has its origin in the country's colonial-era laws dating to 1872. The test deters many women from reporting incidents of rape. More than 100 experts, including doctors, lawyers, police, and women's rights activists had signed a joint statement in 2013 asking for the test, which they called "demeaning", to be abolished, as it "does not provide any evidence that is relevant to proving the offence". This test is also performed in several other countries in the region, including India. It can also be difficult to make a case of sexual assault in court, when members of the judiciary expect evidence of severe struggle and injury as determinative evidence of non-consent. On the other hand, there are measures, such as the 2012 law in Brazil, that allow for cases to be filed even without the representation of the victim.
- Existing laws are insufficient, conflicting, and have no effect in practice: some laws on domestic violence, for instance, conflict with other provisions and ultimately contradict their goals. Legal frameworks can also be flawed when laws that integrate protection do so in isolation, notably in relation to immigration laws. Undocumented women in countries where they would have, in theory, access to justice, do not in practice for fear of being denounced and deported. The CEDAW Committee recommends that a State authority's obligation to report undocumented persons be repealed in national legislation.

Invoking culture to explain particular forms of violence against women risks appearing to legitimize them. There is also debate and controversy about the ways in which cultural traditions, local customs and social expectations, as well as various interpretations of religion, interact with abusive practices. Specifically, cultural justifications for certain violent acts against women are asserted by some states and social groups within many countries claiming to defend their traditions. These justifications are questionable precisely because the defenses are generally voiced by political leaders or traditional authorities, not by those actually affected.

Measures to address violence against women range from access to legal-aid to the provision of shelters and hotlines for victims. Despite advances in legislation and policies, the lack of implementation of the measures put in place prevents significant progress in eradicating violence against women globally. This failure to apply existing laws and procedures is often due to the persisting issue of gender stereotyping.

=== Accessibility of police ===
Women who report acts of violence most often come into contact first with police workers. Therefore, police attitudes are crucial in facilitating a sense of safety and comfort for women who have been victimized. When police officers misuse their power as agents of the state to physically and sexually harass and assault victims, the survivors, including women, feel much less able to report the violence. Human rights violations perpetrated by police and military personnel in many countries are correlated with decreased access to public health services and increased practices of risky behavior among members of vulnerable groups, such as women and female sex workers. These practices are especially widespread in settings with a weak rule of law and low levels of police and military management and professionalism. Police abuse in this context has been linked to a wide range of risky behaviors and health outcomes, including post-traumatic stress disorder (PTSD) and substance abuse. Extortion of sexual services and police sexual abuse have been linked to a decrease in condom use and an elevated risk of STI and HIV infections among vulnerable groups.

Some countries have created women's police stations, which are police stations that specialize in certain crimes, such as sexual violence, harassment, and domestic violence committed against women.

=== Intervention versus autonomy ===
It is standard procedure for police to force entry into the victim's home even after the victim's numerous requests for them to go away. Government agencies often disregard the victim's right to freedom of association with their perpetrator.

== International protection regimes ==
Efforts to fight violence against women can take many forms and access to justice, or lack thereof, for such violence varies greatly depending on the justice system. International and regional instruments are increasingly used as the basis for national legislation and policies to eradicate violence against women. Experts in the international community generally believe that solely enacting punitive legislation for prevention and punishment of violence against women is not sufficient to address the problem. For example, although much stricter laws on violence against women have been passed in Bangladesh, violence against women is still rising. And violence against women has risen dramatically around the world since the late 2010s despite similar measures being taken in many regions as well as increased awareness and discussion of the subject. Instead, it is thought that wide societal changes to address gender inequalities and women's empowerment will be the way to reduce violence against women.

=== Africa ===
In Africa, a series of regional meetings and agreements, was triggered by the UN processes on the international level, such as Third World Conference on Women in Nairobi, 1985; the 1993 Kampala Prep Com; the 1994 Africa-wide UN women's conference that led to the identification of VAW as a critical issue in the Southern African Women's Charter.

=== Americas ===
In the Americas, the Inter-American Convention on Violence Against Women was formally announced and adopted by the Organization of American States (OAS) in 1994, immediately after the Vienna Conference. The Inter-American Convention to Prevent, Eradicate and Punish Violence Against Women (the Belém do Parà Convention) has been applied by the Inter-American Commission on Human Rights (IACHR) in its first case of domestic violence to condemn Brazil in the Maria da Penha case. This led the Brazilian government to enact in 2006 the Maria da Penha Law, the country's first law against domestic violence against women.

=== Asia ===
In Asia, there is the South Asian Agreement on Regional Cooperation's (SAARC) Protocol to End Trafficking in Women and Children.

=== Europe ===
In Europe, the European Union (EU)'s initiatives to combat violence against women include a 1997 resolution calling for zero tolerance, specifically on UN human rights instruments of CEDAW and the Vienna Declaration. The Council of Europe also developed "a series of initiatives" related to the issue of VAW: "the 2000 resolution on trafficking, the 2003 resolution on domestic violence, and the 2004 resolution on honor crimes" as well as promoted "the 2002 recommendation on the protection of women against violence and established its monitoring framework".

The Council of Europe Convention on preventing and combating violence against women and domestic violence (the Istanbul Convention) is the first legally binding instrument in Europe in the field of domestic violence and violence against women, and came into force in 2014. Countries which ratify it must ensure that the forms of violence defined in its text are outlawed. In its Preamble, the Convention states that "the realisation of de jure and de facto equality between women and men is a key element in the prevention of violence against women". The convention also provides a definition of domestic violence as "all acts of physical, sexual, psychological or economic violence that occur within the family or domestic unit or between former or current spouses or partners, whether or not the perpetrator shares or has shared the same residence with the victim".

== See also ==
- Sexism
- Violence against men
- Violence against LGBT people
- Bodily integrity
- Children's rights
- Eve teasing
- Military sexual trauma
- Rhinotomy
- School-related gender-based violence (SRGBV)
- Sexual assault in the U.S. military
- United Nations Security Council Resolution 1325
- Forced conversion of minority girls in Pakistan

== Sources ==
This article incorporates text from a free content work. Licensed under CC BY-SA 3.0 IGO. Text taken from Technology-facilitated gender-based violence in an era of generative AI, Chowdhury, Rumman, UNESCO.

== Bibliography ==
- Almosaed, Nora (2004). "Violence against women: a cross-cultural perspective". Journal of Muslim Minority Affairs. 24 (1). Taylor and Francis: 67–88. doi:10.1080/1360200042000212124. S2CID 144455844.
- Appiah, Kwame Anthony (21 September 2010). "Convincing other cultures to change". Big Think. Archived from the original on 12 December 2013.
- Bellemare, Marc F.; Steinmetz, Tara L. (17 June 2013). "All in the family: explaining the persistence of female genital cutting in the Gambia". Social Science Research Network. doi:10.2139/ssrn.2280086. SSRN 2280086. Pdf.
- Brownmiller, Susan (1975). Against Our Will: Men, Women and Rape. Fawcett Columbine. ISBN 0-449-90820-8.
- Buscatto, Marie; Karttunen, Sari; Provansal, Mathilde, eds. (2025). Gender-Based Violence in Arts and Culture: Perspectives on Education and Work. Open Book Publishers. doi:10.11647/obp.0436. ISBN 978-1-80511-452-9.
- Durham, Meenakshi G. (February 2013). ""Vicious Assault Shakes Texas Town": the politics of gender violence in The New York Times' coverage of a schoolgirl's gang rape". Journalism Studies. 14 (1). Taylor & Francis: 1–12. doi:10.1080/1461670X.2012.657907. S2CID 141709189.
- Heise, L (1993). "Violence against women: the hidden health burden". World Health Statistics Quarterly. Rapport Trimestriel de Statistiques Sanitaires Mondiales. 46 (1): 78–85. PMID 8237054. Republished as: Heise, Lori; Pitanguy, Jacqueline; Germain, Adrienne; Bank, World (1994). Violence Against Women: The Hidden Health Burden. World Bank. ISBN 978-0-8213-2980-1. OCLC 654453001.
- James, Stanlie M. (Summer 1998). "Shades of othering: reflections on female circumcision/genital mutilation". Signs: Journal of Women in Culture and Society. 23 (4). University of Chicago Press: 1031–1048. doi:10.1086/495300. JSTOR 3175202. S2CID 144380933.
- Jones, Helen; Diop, Nafissatou; Askew, Ian; Kaboré, Inoussa (September 1999). "Female genital cutting practices in Burkina Faso and Mali and their negative health outcomes". Studies in Family Planning. 30 (3). Wiley: 219–230. doi:10.1111/j.1728-4465.1999.00219.x. PMID 10546313.
- Jones, Wanda K.; Smith, Jack; Kieke Jr., Burney; Wilcox, Lynne (September 1997). "Female genital mutilation/female circumcision: who is at risk in the US?". Public Health Reports. 112 (5): 368–377. PMC 1381943. PMID 9323387. Pdf.
- Kelly, Liz (December 2005). "Inside outsiders: Mainstreaming violence against women into human rights discourse and practice". International Feminist Journal of Politics. 7 (4). Taylor and Francis: 471–495. doi:10.1080/14616740500284391. S2CID 143985481.
- Mackie, Gerry (June 2003). "Female genital cutting: a harmless practice?". Medical Anthropology Quarterly. 17 (2). Wiley on behalf of the American Anthropological Association: 135–158. doi:10.1525/maq.2003.17.2.135. JSTOR 3655332. PMID 12846114. Pdf.
- Miles, Rosalind (1988). Who Cooked the Last Supper? The Women's History of the World. Three Rivers Press. ISBN 0-609-80695-5.
- Seftaoui, Jamila (2009) Bringing Security Home: Combating Violence against Women in the OSCE Region; A Compilation of Good Practices. Vienna: OSCE Secretariat, OSG/Gender Section, ISBN 9789292345341 (also published in French and Russian translations)
- Shell-Duncan, Bettina; Herniund, Yiva (August 2006). "Are there "Stages of Change" in the practice of female genital cutting?: Qualitative research findings from Senegal and The Gambia". African Journal of Reproductive Health. 10 (2). Women's Health and Action Research Centre (WHARC): 57–71. doi:10.2307/30032459. JSTOR 30032459. PMID 17217118.
- Skaine, Rosemarie (2005). Female genital mutilation: legal, cultural, and medical issues. Jefferson, North Carolina: McFarland & Company, Inc. ISBN 978-0-7864-2167-1.
- Wagner, Natascha (March 2013). Why female genital cutting persist? (PDF). Working Paper. University of Rotterdam. Archived from the original (PDF) on 3 May 2022.
- True, Jacqui (2012). The political economy of violence against women. New York, NY: Oxford University Press. ISBN 978-0-19-975591-2.
- Wakabi, Wairagala (31 March 2007). "Africa battles to make female genital mutilation history". The Lancet. 369 (9567). Elsevier: 1069–1070. doi:10.1016/S0140-6736(07)60508-X. PMID 17405200. S2CID 29006442.
- Williams, Lindy; Sobieszczyk, Teresa (November 1997). "Attitudes surrounding the continuation of female circumcision in the Sudan: passing the tradition to the next generation". Journal of Marriage and Family. 59 (4). Wiley: 966–981. doi:10.2307/353796. JSTOR 353796.
