= Anonymous proxy =

Online privacy tool

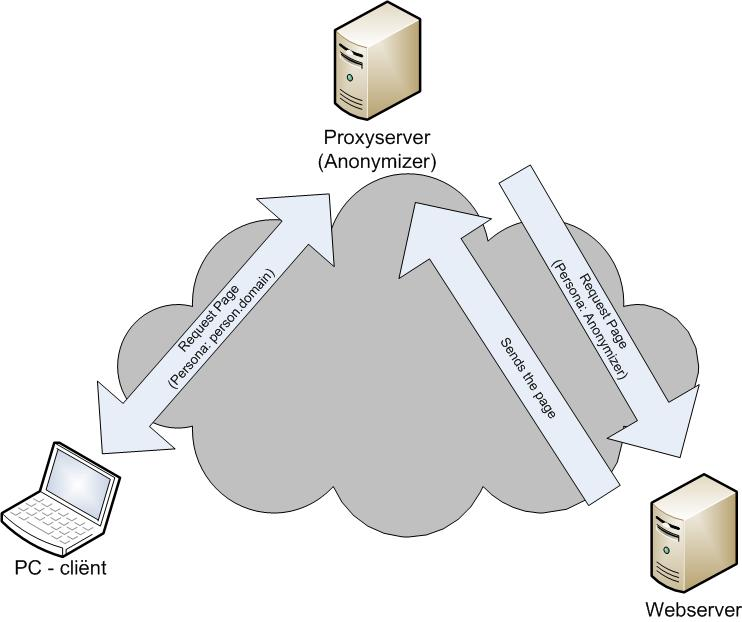
Illustration of how a client accesses a web page using an anonymous browsing service

An anonymizer or anonymous proxy is a tool that attempts to make activity on the Internet untraceable. It is a proxy server computer that acts as an intermediary and privacy shield between a client computer and the rest of the Internet. It accesses the Internet on the user's behalf, protecting personal information of the user by hiding the client computer's identifying information such as IP addresses.

Reasons for using anonymizers include minimizing risk, prevention of identity theft, or protecting search histories from public disclosure. Some countries apply heavy censorship on the internet via geo-blocking. Anonymizers can help to allow free access to all of the internet content, but they cannot help against persecution for accessing the anonymizer itself. As information itself about anonymizers may be banned in those countries, governments may create fake websites to entrap users. Anonymizers are also used to avoid targeted marketing and information and to get a more objective view of information.

Anonymizers can be classified into protocol-specific and protocol-independent proxies. In protocol-specific anonymizers, a connection is made by the user to the anonymizer, with commands to the anonymizer included inside typical messages. The anonymizer then makes a connection to the resource specified by the inbound command and relays the message with the command stripped out. Protocol-independent anonymizers are achieved by creating a network tunnel to an anonymizer via a protocol such as SOCKS, PPTP, or OpenVPN. For building a reliable anonymous system, anonymous proxy signatures are helpful. These signatures can also be used in anonymous voting or other authentication processes that value anonymity.

Examples of anonymizer websites include Anonymouse, Anonymize, Anonymizer, IDZap, Ultimate Anonymity, The Cloak, and GhostSurf Platinum. Websites such as GoTrusted.com and Anonymizer.com offer users internet access with anonymity via a virtual private network (VPN) that routes their online traffic through the companies' servers. Examples of protocol-specific anonymizers include anonymous remailers, web proxies and bouncers for FTP and IRC, and anonymity integrated with RFID tags.

== Use of multiple relays ==
Proxies can be daisy chained. Chaining anonymous proxies can make traffic analysis far more complex and costly by requiring the eavesdropper to be able to monitor different parts of the Internet. An anonymizing remailer can use this concept by relaying a message to another remailer, and eventually to its destination.

Even stronger anonymity can be gained by using Tor, an onion router. Using Tor means that routing information and message content are encrypted in such a way as to prevent linking the origin and destination. Like all anonymity networks, Tor cannot end-to-end encrypt messages destined for the public internet; it must be arranged between the sender and recipient. Tor's onion service protocol does, however, provide end-to-end encryption, along with the ability to anonymize servers, making them more censorship-resistant.

Another anonymity network is the Invisible Internet Project (I2P). Unlike Tor, I2P is an internal, dynamic and decentralized network where each node routes traffic for others and blends its own traffic in, such that one's own traffic is relayed by other peers through tunnels made up of various other peers. As all traffic always stays within the I2P network, a routing user's I2P can remain end-to-end encrypted and will never show on public websites' logs.

== See also ==
- Anonymous P2P
- Anonymization
- Private browsing
- Java Anon Proxy - a proxy system designed to allow browsing the Web with revocable pseudonymity.
- Open proxy
