= PWS =

PWS may refer to:

== Technology ==
- Personal weather station
- Personal web server, hardware and software used to run a web server on a desktop computer
  - Microsoft Personal Web Server, software for Windows operating systems
- Present weather sensor, a device that detects and measures precipitation
- Pressure wave supercharger, a type of super-charger
- Progressive Web Site, a web authoring framework incorporating HTML5, CSS, and JavaScript
- Public Warning System, used for alerting the public to events such as disasters

== Other uses ==
- Palestine Wildlife Society
- Performance work statement, summarizing the work element of a contract
- Podlaska Wytwórnia Samolotów, a Polish aircraft manufacturer
- Prader–Willi syndrome, a genetic disorder
- Purwosari railway station in Indonesia (station code PWS)
- Tasmania Parks and Wildlife Service
- Winston Smith Project (Italian:Progetto Winston Smith), a human rights project
