= Johan Helsingius =

Finnish internet remailer (born 1961)

Johan "Julf" Helsingius, born in 1961 in Helsinki, Finland, started and ran the Anon.penet.fi internet remailer.

== Background ==
=== Penet remailer ===
Anon.penet.fi was one of the most popular anonymous remailers, handling 10,000 messages a day. The server was the first of its kind to use a password-protected PO box system for sending and receiving e-mails. In the 1980s, he was the system administrator for the central Finnish news node as well as a founding members of the Finnish UNIX User Group. In a 1994 interview with Wired, he said he created the service because "It's important to be able to express certain views without everyone knowing who you are."

In 1996, he announced his remailer would shut down due to legal pressure from the Church of Scientology. Scientology officials, upset that some users of Helsingius' service were sending information about the church, obtained a court order to force him to reveal the identity of many of the site's users. When announcing the service's closure, he wrote, "I will close the remailer for the time being because the legal issues concerning the Internet in Finland are yet undefined." The American Electronic Frontier Foundation (EFF), an Internet civil rights initiative, reported continuously on the incidents concerning anon.penet.fi and collected donations to cover legal costs should Helsingius be involved in a court case to settle whether Finnish law could force him to reveal the identity of anon.penet.fi users. The closing down of anon.penet.fi led to an outbreak of outrage and solidarity with Helsingius throughout the Internet in order to protect freedom on the Internet.

=== Later work ===
Helsingius went on to help found EUnet in Finland and was part of the team of people that established the first Internet link to USSR. Later, when EUnet was acquired by Qwest Communications and soon after moved into KPNQwest, Qwest's joint venture with KPN International, Julf became Chief Technology Officer (CTO) for KPNQwest. He is now an Internet entrepreneur and is serving on the board of various companies (e.g. BaseN, which is based in Finland). Helsingius lives in Amsterdam, the Netherlands.

Helsingius has studied music and traveled widely. His interests include active sports, like mountain climbing, and aviation.
