= 2012 University of Pittsburgh bomb threats =

Coordinates: 40.4457°N 79.9578°W

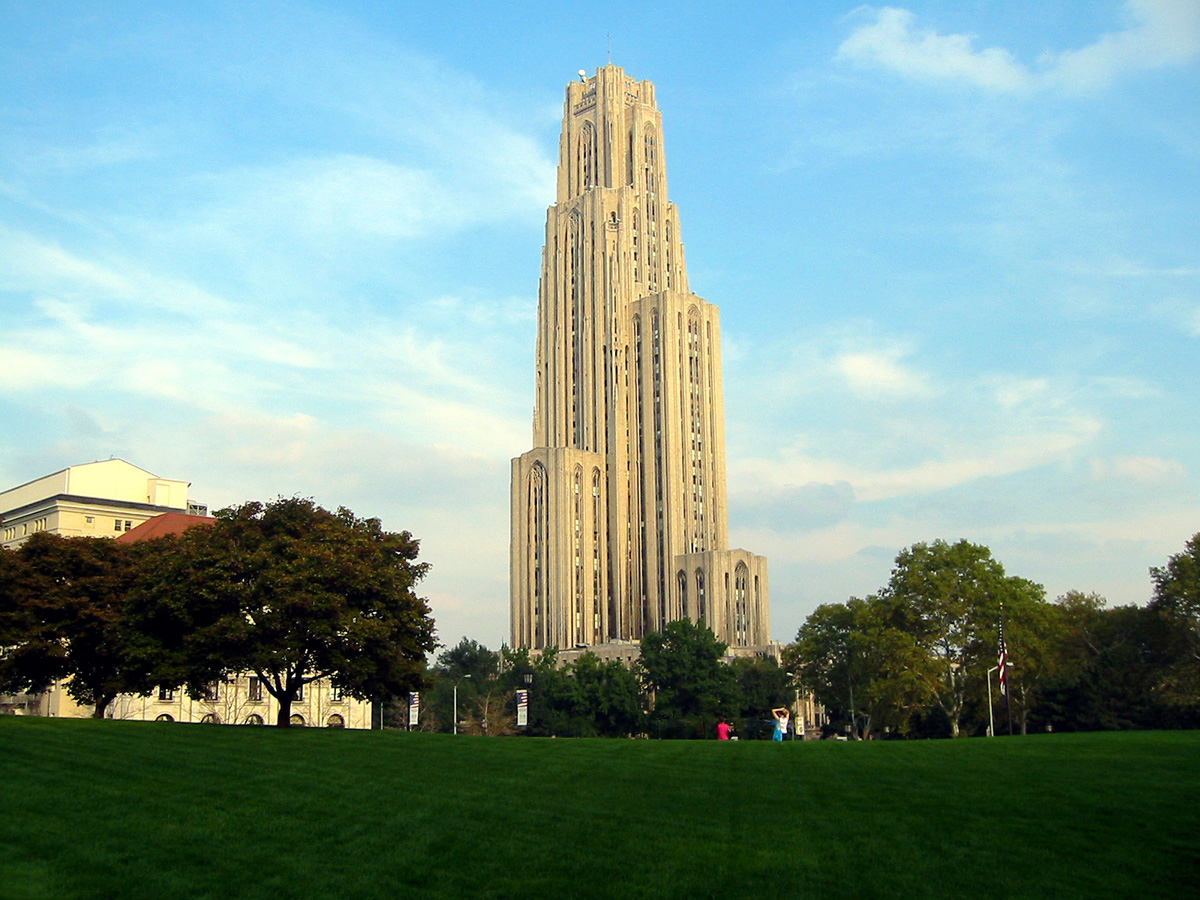
The Cathedral of Learning has been the subject of a multitude of bomb threats

In 2012, a series of bomb threats was made towards the University of Pittsburgh. The first threat was written on a bathroom stall in the Chevron Science Center and was observed on February 13, 2012. It was not until approximately a month later, however, that threats occurred with increasing frequency. The number of bomb threats totaled approximately 160 as of April 21, 2012, after which police reported no additional related threats.

== Delivery ==
Several threats were written on bathroom stalls in the Cathedral of Learning and Chevron Science Center. Several more are known to have originated via email. Some of the emails are believed to have been routed through intermediate servers using Mixmaster, a type of anonymous remailer that makes the origin of an email almost impossible to determine. The threats targeted dozens of buildings at the University of Pittsburgh in addition to buildings at a number of nearby educational institutions: Western Pennsylvania School for Blind Children, Point Park University, California University of Pennsylvania, and Community College of Allegheny County (CCAC).

== Investigation ==
The FBI and Secret Service had identified at least one person of interest related to the case, and local police collaborated with the Department of Justice and the Joint Terrorism Task Force. On April 11, police arrested Mark Lee Krangle, a Pitt alumnus and former teaching fellow who wrote a harassing email to Pitt professors that advised international terrorism was behind the bomb threats, as he disembarked at Pittsburgh International Airport. On the same day, the Pittsburgh US Attorney's Office claimed that "significant progress" had been made in the investigation of the bomb threats.

== Response ==
The University of Pittsburgh offered a reward of up to $10,000 on March 30 "for information leading to an arrest and conviction" of those responsible for the threats, which was raised to up to $50,000 on April 2 before being withdrawn on April 21. The University has also removed some bathroom stall doors in the Cathedral of Learning and ramped up security in the building. Chancellor Mark Nordenberg wrote a letter to the University on April 3 in which he said that "...those responsible for these threats not only lack basic respect for the thousands of people whose lives have been disrupted by them but must possess a heartless streak," and another on April 6, in which he lamented that "It is true ... that this could have happened anywhere. But sadly, it is happening here at Pitt – on a campus that is widely recognized as safe by all comparative measures and that is known for its sense of community." On April 8, the University announced that it would be tightening security measures, including provisions such as requiring all people entering University buildings to present University IDs, only allowing students to enter residence halls, and disallowing backpacks and packages from being brought into buildings. This policy was soon changed to allow backpacks into buildings, and on April 9 the Cathedral of Learning had more than one open entrance (All guarded by security).

== Conclusion ==
On April 10, the Pittsburgh Post-Gazette received a note from "The Threateners" demanding that the University of Pittsburgh take down the $50,000 reward they offered for information leading to the culprit or culprits. They offered a 24-hour window without bomb threats, which they upheld. Pitt and the FBI decided to not negotiate with terrorists, ignoring the demand, and the Post-Gazette did not publish a story about the offer.

Then, on April 20, 2012, The Pitt News, the daily student newspaper, received a similar email from "The Threateners" offering a 24-hour window without threats, which they stuck to, and then demanded that Pitt takes down the $50,000 reward. Some of the email stated,

this all began when you, Nordenberg, put out a $10,000 — then $50,000 — ‘reward’ (bounty) for some young kid who’d pranked the University. Remember? That REALLY angered us! Hey, man! This is America! We don't treat our kids like that! Simply withdraw the 'reward,' and we will end our actions permanently.

They also claimed to have no ties to any persons of interest Pitt has identified.

The Pitt News notified the university that it was writing a story about the offer, which led the University of Pittsburgh to withdraw the $50,000 reward by the morning of April 21, 2012. Since the morning of April 21, there have been no more bomb threats at the University of Pittsburgh. The university's final count of bomb threats was 160, targeting 52 buildings that lead to 136 evacuations.

On August 15, 2012, it was reported that Adam Busby of Dublin, Ireland was indicted in connection with the e-mailed threats. As of November 6, 2013 no updates on Adam Busby's involvement have been published. In addition, there have been no indictments whatsoever for the two months of bomb threats at the University of Pittsburgh that occurred before the concluding weeks of threats for which Busby has been indicted.
