= Len Sassaman =

American technologist and cryptographer (1980–2011)

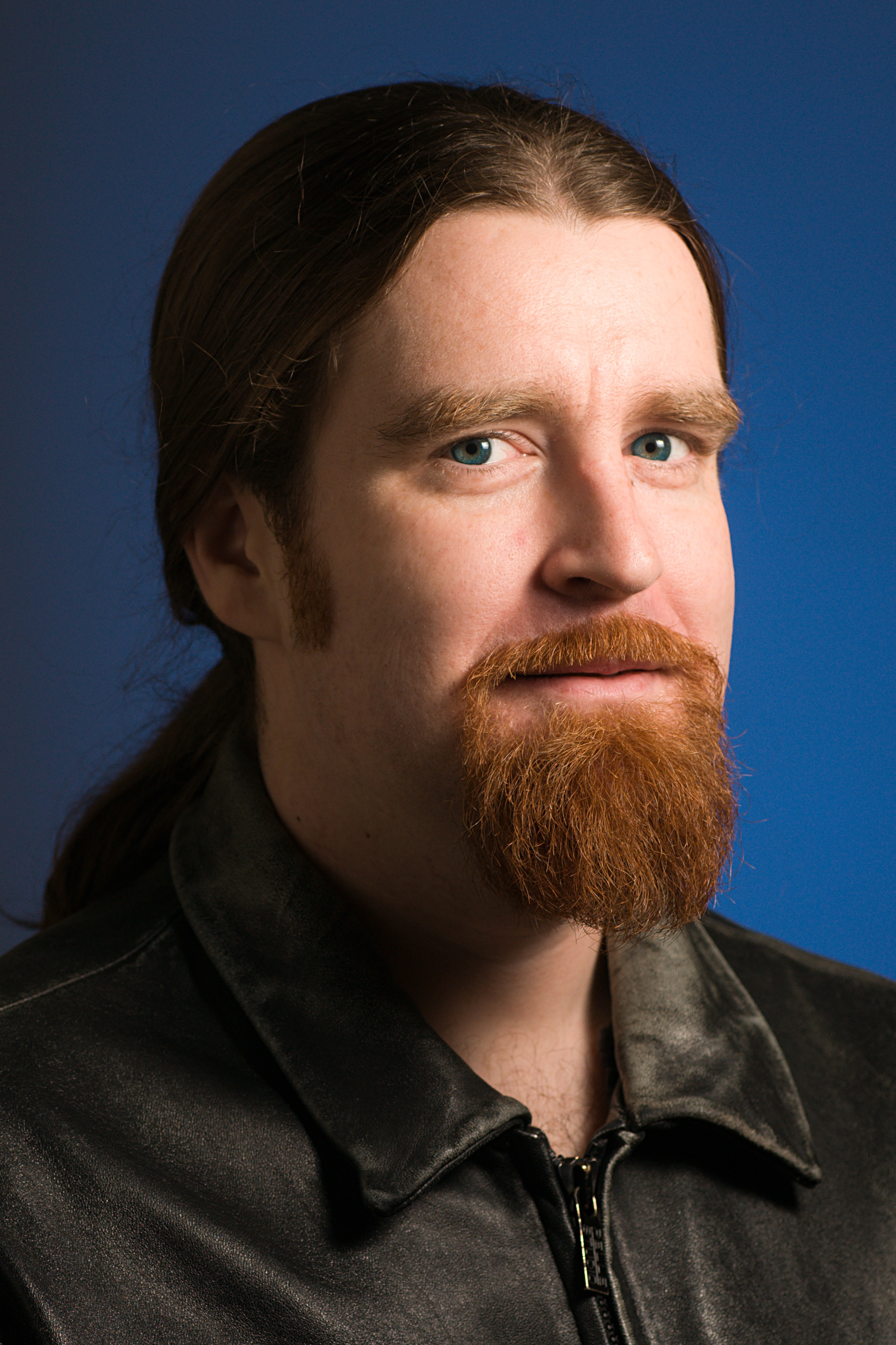
- Sassaman in 2010
- Born: April 9, 1980; Pottstown, Pennsylvania, US
- Died: July 3, 2011 (aged 31); Leuven, Flemish Brabant, Belgium
- Occupation: Researcher at COSIC
- Known for: Mixmaster, X.509 attacks
- Spouse: Meredith L. Patterson (m. 2006)

Leonard Harris Sassaman (April 9, 1980 – July 3, 2011) was an American technologist, information privacy advocate, and the maintainer of the Mixmaster anonymous remailer code and operator of the randseed remailer. Much of his career gravitated towards cryptography and protocol development.

== Early life and education ==
Sassaman graduated in 1998 from The Hill School, Pottstown, Pennsylvania. He was diagnosed with depression as a teenager. By 18, he was on the Internet Engineering Task Force responsible for the TCP/IP protocol underlying the Internet. In 1999, Len moved to the San Francisco Bay Area, quickly became a regular in the cypherpunk community, and moved in with Bram Cohen.

== Career ==
Sassaman was employed as the security architect and senior systems engineer for Anonymizer. He was a PhD candidate at the Katholieke Universiteit Leuven in Belgium, as a researcher with the Computer Security and Industrial Cryptography (COSIC) research group, led by Bart Preneel. David Chaum and Bart Preneel were his advisors.

Sassaman was a well-known cypherpunk, cryptographer and privacy advocate. He worked for Network Associates on the PGP encryption software, was a member of the Shmoo Group, a contributor to the OpenPGP IETF working group, the GNU Privacy Guard project, and frequently appeared at technology conferences like DEF CON. Sassaman was the co-founder of CodeCon along with Bram Cohen, co-founder of the HotPETS workshop (with Roger Dingledine of Tor and Thomas Heydt-Benjamin), co-author of the Zimmermann–Sassaman key-signing protocol, and at the age of 21, was an organizer of the protests following the arrest of Russian programmer Dmitry Sklyarov.

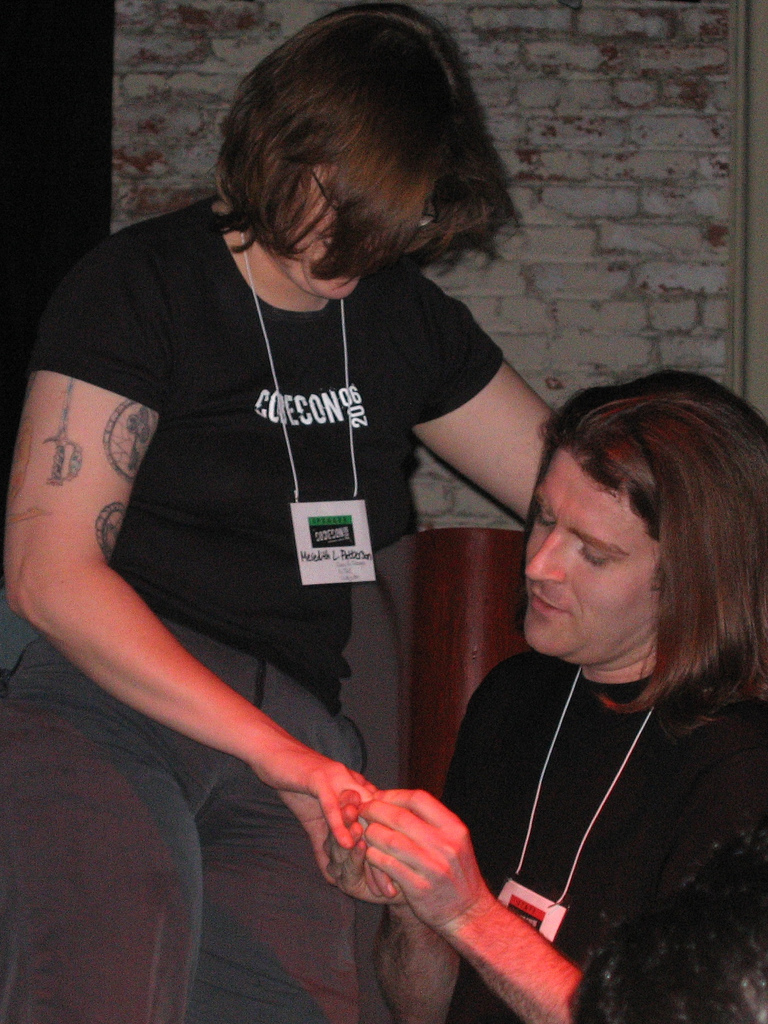
Len slips a blue cable-tie ring on Meredith's finger

On February 11, 2006, at the fifth CodeCon, Sassaman proposed to returning speaker and noted computer scientist Meredith L. Patterson during the Q&A after her presentation, and they were married. The couple worked together on several research collaborations, including a critique of privacy flaws in the OLPC Bitfrost security platform, and a proposal of formal methods of analysis of computer insecurity in February 2011.

Sassaman and Patterson founded the startup Osogato in 2006 aiming to commercialize Patterson's Support Vector Machine-based "Query By Example" (later "OBELisQ") project. Sassaman and Patterson announced Osogato's first products, a music console application and a music analysis library, at SuperHappyDevHouse #21 in San Francisco.

In 2009, Dan Kaminsky presented joint work with Sassaman and Patterson at Black Hat in Las Vegas, showing multiple methods for attacking the X.509 certificate authority infrastructure. Using these techniques, the team demonstrated how an attacker could obtain a certificate that clients would treat as valid for domains the attacker did not control.

In 2021, developer Evan Hatch proposed Sassaman as a possible candidate to be Satoshi Nakamoto. Sassaman had been mentioned on bitcointalk on 15 March 2013 when a user suggested Sassaman was Satoshi. A presentation given by Kaminsky at the 2011 Black Hat Briefings revealed that a testimonial in honor of Sassaman had been permanently embedded into bitcoin's blockchain.

== Death ==
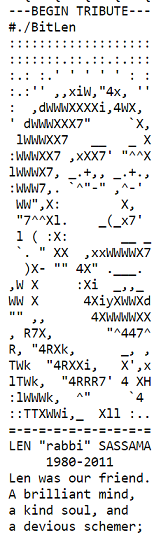
Len memorial on the Bitcoin blockchain

Sassaman was reported dead on July 3, 2011. Patterson stated on the same day after speaking to Belgian police that her husband's death was "unambiguously suicide". After he had stopped responding to instant messages from Patterson while she was in the United States, she asked a friend to fly to Belgium to check up on him and the friend "found him hanging in the closet". (Note: A Leuven-based "good friend" of the couple recalled learning of Sassaman's death from Patterson after returning from the nearby annual Rock Werchter music festival, which ended on July 3, 2011.) He was laid to rest on July 9, 2011, at De Jacht Cemetery at Heverlee in Leuven, Belgium.

An ASCII art tribute by Dan Kaminsky in honor of Len, to be permanently embedded into bitcoin's blockchain, was first announced during "The Wake for Len Sassaman" held at the DNA Lounge in San Francisco on July 30, 2011. Kaminsky revealed it publicly during Black Hat USA 2011 at the Caesars Palace venue in Las Vegas.

== See also ==
- Information privacy
- Information security
