= Meredith L. Patterson =

American technologist, science fiction author, and journalist (born 1977)

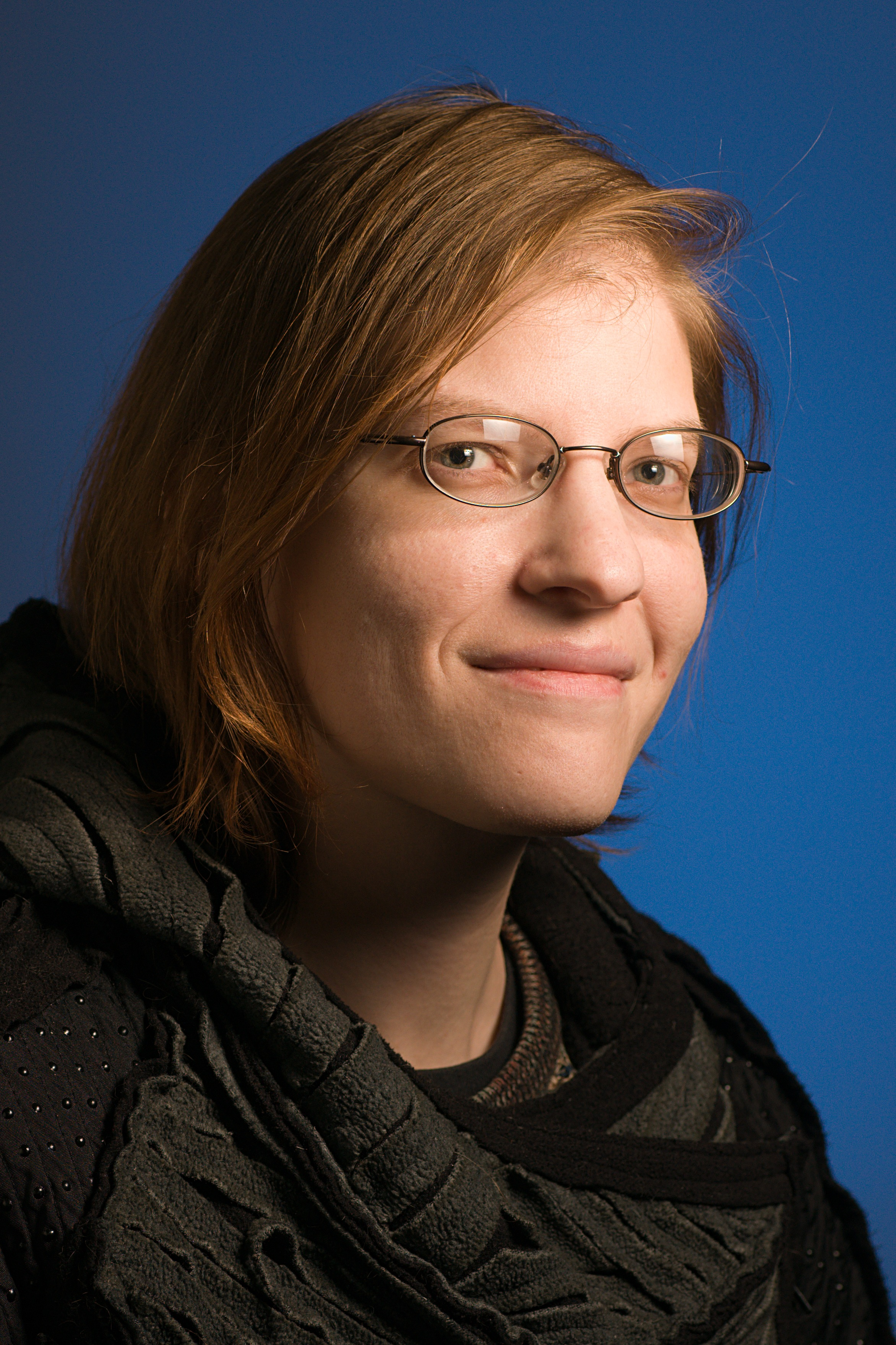
- Meredith Patterson (2010)
- Born: April 30, 1977 (age 49)
- Occupations: Researcher, writer
- Known for: Weird machine, DIYbio, X.509 attacks
- Spouse: Len Sassaman (m. 2006; died 2011)

Meredith L. Patterson (born April 30, 1977) is an American technologist, science fiction writer, and journalist. She has spoken at numerous industry conferences on a wide range of topics. She is also a blogger and software developer, and a leading figure in the biopunk movement.

Raised in Houston, she pursued an education in linguistics and computer science, earning a Master's degree in linguistics and a PhD in computer science from the University of Iowa. Patterson's early career involved diverse roles like website design, technical writing, teaching math, and restaurant criticism for the Houston Press.

Her contributions in computer science include breakthroughs in computational linguistics applied to computer security. She introduced innovative techniques to counter SQL injection attacks and integrated data mining libraries into PostgreSQL databases, giving rise to her startup, Osogato. She also actively contributed to open-source projects and co-presented significant research on internet security vulnerabilities with her husband Len Sassaman. As a writer, Patterson has written science fiction stories and poetry, often inspired by her scientific interests. She has also engaged in blogging, addressing topics like copyright reform, biohacking, civil rights, and programming languages.

== Early life ==
Patterson lived in and around Houston for 24 years before moving to Iowa City, Iowa, to pursue her Master's degree in linguistics and PhD in computer science. Patterson attended Kingwood High School from 1990 to 1994. She supported herself working as a website designer, technical writer, math teacher, and restaurant critic for the Houston Press. She served as the treasurer of the Mars Society Houston branch in 1999. That same year, at age 22, she traveled above the Arctic Circle as a NASA correspondent for a Mars simulation mission.

== Computer science and academic career ==
Patterson is known for her work in computational linguistics and its applications to computer security. In 2005, she presented the first parse tree validation technique for stopping SQL injection attacks at the Black Hat conference in Las Vegas.

She has integrated her support vector machine datamining library inside of PostgreSQL to provide a "query-by-example" extension to the SQL language, allowing DBAs to quickly and easily form complex datamining requests based on example positive and negative inputs.

Her presentation at the 2006 CodeCon was Query By Example - Data mining operations within PostgreSQL

While this work was initially funded by Google's Summer of Code program, Patterson's datamining work now forms the basis of her startup, Osogato, which couples the datamining database with acoustic feature extractors allowing users to create playlists from their own music collections and find new music based on the properties of the music they provide as sample inputs. Osogato was launched at SuperHappyDevHouse.

Prior to founding Osogato, Patterson worked for Mu Security (now Mu Dynamics). Before that, she was a PhD student at the University of Iowa. She did her undergrad work in linguistics at the University of Houston and received her master's degree in linguistics from the University of Iowa.

Patterson has contributed to multiple open-source database software projects, including SciTools, Klein, and QBE, and written patches to PostgreSQL. Her "Dejector" library integrates with PostgreSQL to implement the SQL injection approach taken in her Black Hat paper. Patterson is also credited with contributing to the Summer of Code project Firekeeper, which her husband, Len Sassaman, mentored.

In 2009 at BlackHat, Dan Kaminsky presented joint work with Patterson and Sassaman, revealing pervasive flaws in the Internet's certificate authority infrastructure. Their work revealed that existing web browsers could be fooled into accepting fraudulent X.509 certificates.

== Writing career ==
As a science fiction author, Patterson has published numerous short stories in such magazines as Fortean Bureau and Strange Horizons and in compilations such as The Doom of Camelot and The Children of Cthulhu and is credited with contributing to the Steve Jackson Games game GURPS Villains. Her poetry has been influenced by her scientific research; for example, her poem "Leaving Devon Island" is in reference to the Flashline Mars Arctic Research Station on Devon Island, Nunavut, Canada.

== Blogger ==
Patterson frequently discusses such issues as copyright reform, biohacking, the Military Commissions Act, Proposition 8 and civil rights issues, and programming languages on her personal blog. Patterson has contributed multiple articles to the blog BoingBoing.

In spring of 2008, she published a paper with David Chaum and Len Sassaman in a USENIX workshop criticizing the lack of attention paid to user-privacy in the OLPC (One Laptop per Child) computer.

Since late 2015 she has been the co-editor (jointly with the self-described Catholic social conservative anarcho-capitalist using the pseudonym ClarkHat) of the Status:451 blog, which describes freedom of speech as its "founding principle", and garnered attention in April 2016 for launching a successful crowdfunding campaign towards retaining the neo-reactionary blogger and entrepreneur Curtis Yarvin as speaker at the LambdaConf programming conference. She has displayed a modified version of Southern Poverty Law Center's intelligence director Heidi Beirich's assessment of Status:451 ("appears juvenile but does not seem to reflect a white supremacist organization") on her Twitter account since.

== Personal ==
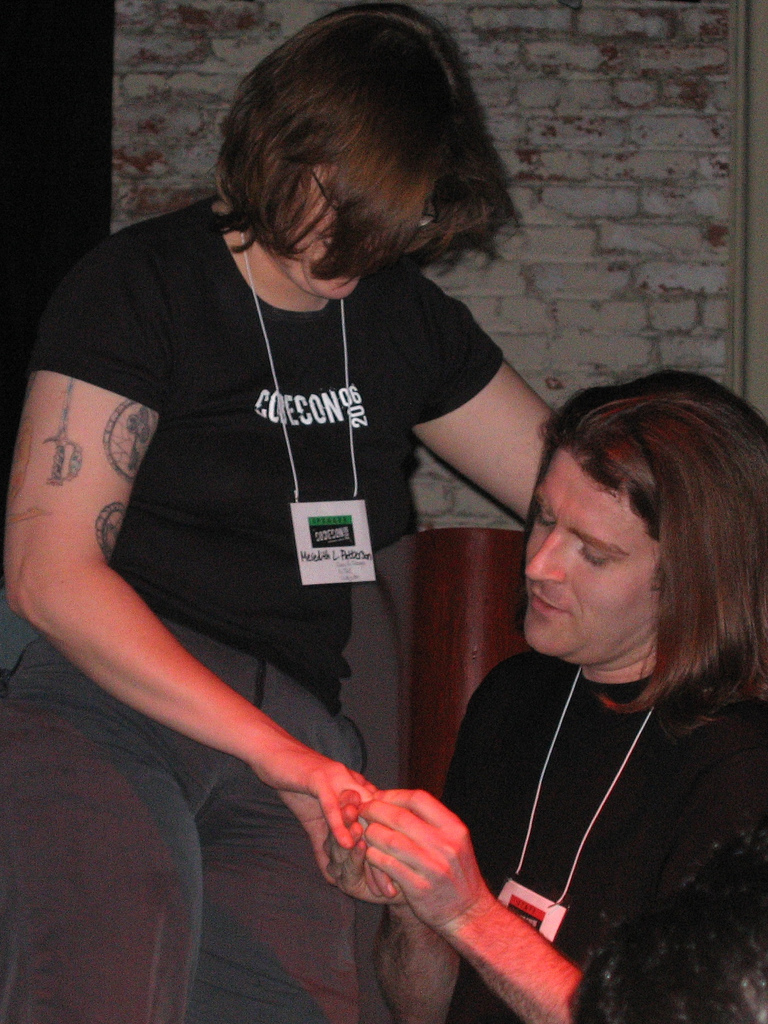
Sassaman slips a blue cable-tie ring on Pattersons' finger

A two-time CodeCon presenter, Patterson married the co-organizer of the event, Len Sassaman, after a public proposal at CodeCon 2006. As Sassaman was also famous among the geek community, their marriage was held up as an example of a geek power couple. They were together until Sassaman's death in 2011.

Patterson, who was diagnosed with autism in adulthood, has stated that "a single-minded focus" has helped her to have an "overwhelmingly positive relationship" with the male-dominated technology community. Although acknowledging that other women have experienced discrimination or sexual assault, she has urged advocacy groups not to minimize the experiences of women who feel welcome, and prefers the Anita Borg Institute for Women and Technology over the Ada Initiative on these grounds.

== See also ==
- Information privacy – Legal issues regarding the collection and dissemination of data
- Information security – Protecting information by mitigating risk
