= Anonymizer (company) =

Internet privacy company

- Type: Privately Held
- Industry: Computer and Network Security
- Predecessor: Infonex Internet
- Founder: Lance Cottrell
- Headquarters: San Diego, California
- Key people: Lance Cottrell, founder, president
- Products: Anonymizer Universal
- Owner: Ntrepid
- Website: www.anonymizer.com

Anonymizer, Inc. is an Internet privacy company, founded in 1995 by Lance Cottrell, author of the Mixmaster anonymous remailer. Anonymizer was originally named Infonex Internet. The name was changed to Anonymizer in 1997 when the company acquired a web based privacy proxy of the same name developed by Justin Boyan at Carnegie Mellon University School of Computer Science. Boyan licensed the software to C2Net for public beta testing before selling it to Infonex.

One of the first web privacy companies founded, Anonymizer creates a VPN link between its servers and its users computer, creating a random IP address, rather than the one actually being used. This can be used to anonymously report a crime, avoid spam, avoid Internet censorship, keep the users identity safe and track competitors, among other uses.

== History ==
The Patriot Act, which was signed in October 2001 in response to the September 11 attacks, brought more attention to anonymization tools. Lance Cottrell was quoted saying that Anonymizer keeps no record of activity or users, which protects both the company and its users from FBI subpoenas.

Anonymizer was featured as one of the "50 Most Incredibly Useful Sites" in the July 2002 issue of Yahoo! Internet Life magazine.

The StealthSurfer II of 2005 came with Anonymizer, using a 128-bit SSL technology to mask IP addresses and create an encrypted channel. In 2005, Anonymizer maintained a product line including Anonymous Surfing (AS), to keep users IP addresses anonymous; Anti-Spyware, this found and removed spyware from its user's computer; Digital Shredder, which removed cookies, temporary files, and emptied cache; and Total Privacy Suite, which featured all three aforementioned products.

Anonymizer's "Operation: Anti-Censorship" software, introduced in 2006, addresses internet censorship in the People's Republic of China by allowing Chinese Internet users to access blocked sites.

=== Ownership ===
Abraxas Corporation acquired Anonymizer in May 2008. In 2010, Cubic purchased Abraxas for $124 million in cash.

Ntrepid acquired Anonymizer in late 2010; it is a wholly owned subsidiary of Ntrepid.

== Products ==
Anonymizer offers a variety of consumer information security services including VPN for multi-protocol proxy, client software for iPhone and iPad, an anonymizer Proxy server, encrypted e-mail services, anti-spyware, anti-phishing, anti-pharming and enterprise class competitive intelligence tools. Although these used to be separate products, Anonymizer has one product, Anonymizer Universal, as of early 2014.

== Trademark ==
The term "anonymizer" is often used to signify any internet based anonymization tool, even though it is a trademark of Anonymizer Inc.

== See also ==
- Java Anon Proxy
- Proxy server
- Pseudonymization
- Tor (anonymity network)
