= Ntrepid =

American software, hardware, and cyber security company

- Company type: Software, hardware, and cyber security company
- Founded: October 25, 2010; 15 years ago
- Headquarters: Herndon, Virginia, U.S.
- Products: Passages; ION; Nfusion; Timestream; Tartan; Virtus; ELUSIV
- Subsidiaries: Anonymizer
- Website: ntrepidcorp.com

Ntrepid is an American software, hardware, and cyber security company, registered in Florida and based in Herndon, Virginia.

== History ==
In 2008, the Anonymizer company was acquired by the Abraxas Corporation, which was purchased by Cubic in 2010 for $124 million. Some of Abraxas' former employees left to form Ntrepid that same year. Lance Cottrell, founder of Anonymizer, was the chief scientist at Ntrepid. Anonymizer is wholly owned by Ntrepid. In October 2018, Ntrepid transitioned Anonymizer.com consumer anonymity accounts to Invincibull to focus on managed attribution.

== Military contract ==
In March 2011, Ntrepid won a $2.76 million contract from the U.S. military for "online persona management." The contract was for the creation of technology which would allow for blogging activities on websites, exclusively outside of the United States, to "counter violent extremist and enemy propaganda." It would allow for one operator to anonymously create and control up to ten personas from one computer.

The project is overseen by U.S. Central Command (Centcom), whose spokesman Commander Bill Speaks stated that the operation would be carried out in Arabic, Persian, and Urdu.

The project is thought to be connected with Operation Earnest Voice.
