= Pseudonym =

Fictitious name used for a particular purpose

A pseudonym (/ˈsjuːd.ə.nɪm/; from Ancient Greek ψευδώνυμος (pseudṓnumos) 'falsely named') or alias (/ˈeɪ.li.əs/, AY-lee-əs) is a fictitious name that a person assumes for a particular purpose, which differs from their original or true name (orthonym). This also differs from a new name that entirely or legally replaces an individual's own. Many pseudonym holders use them because they wish to remain anonymous and maintain privacy, though this may be difficult to achieve as a result of legal issues.

== Scope ==
Pseudonyms include stage names, user names, ring names, pen names, aliases, superhero or villain identities and code names, gamertags, and regnal names of emperors, popes, and other monarchs. In some cases, it may also include nicknames. Historically, they have sometimes taken the form of anagrams, Graecisms, and Latinisations.

Pseudonyms are different from new names that replace old ones. Pseudonyms are "part-time" names, used only in certain contexts: to provide a more clear-cut separation between one's private and professional lives, to showcase or enhance a particular persona, or to hide an individual's real identity, as with writers' pen names, graffiti artists' tags, resistance fighters' or terrorists' noms de guerre, computer hackers' handles, and other online identities for services such as social media, online gaming, and internet forums. Actors, musicians, and other performers sometimes use stage names for a degree of privacy, to better market themselves, and other reasons.

Some pseudonyms are part of a cultural or organisational tradition; for example, devotional names are used by members of some religious institutes, and "cadre names" are used by Communist party leaders such as Trotsky and Lenin.

=== Collective pseudonyms ===
A collective name or collective pseudonym is one shared by two or more persons, for example, the co-authors of a work, such as Carolyn Keene, Erin Hunter, Ellery Queen, H. Bustos Domecq, Nicolas Bourbaki, or James S. A. Corey.

Publius was a collective pseudonym used by James Madison, Alexander Hamilton and John Jay in writing The Federalist Papers. The individual authorship of some of the papers is still debated.

== Etymology ==
Pseudonym comes from the Greek ψευδώνυμον pseudṓnymon 'false name', from ψεῦδος pseûdos 'lie, falsehood' and ὄνομα (ónoma) 'name'. Alias is a Latin adverb meaning "at another time, elsewhere".

== Usage ==
=== Name change ===
Sometimes people change their names in such a manner that the new name becomes permanent and is used by all who know the person. This is not an alias or pseudonym, but in fact a new name. In many countries, including common law countries, a name change can be ratified by a court and become a person's new legal name.

=== Concealing identity ===
Pseudonymous authors may still have their various identities linked together through stylometric analysis of their writing style. The precise degree of this unmasking ability and its ultimate potential is uncertain, but the privacy risks are expected to grow with improved analytic techniques and text corpora. Authors may practice adversarial stylometry to resist such identification.

==== Business ====
Businesspersons of ethnic minorities in some parts of the world are sometimes advised by an employer to use a pseudonym that is common or acceptable in that area when conducting business, to overcome racial or religious bias.

==== Criminal activity ====
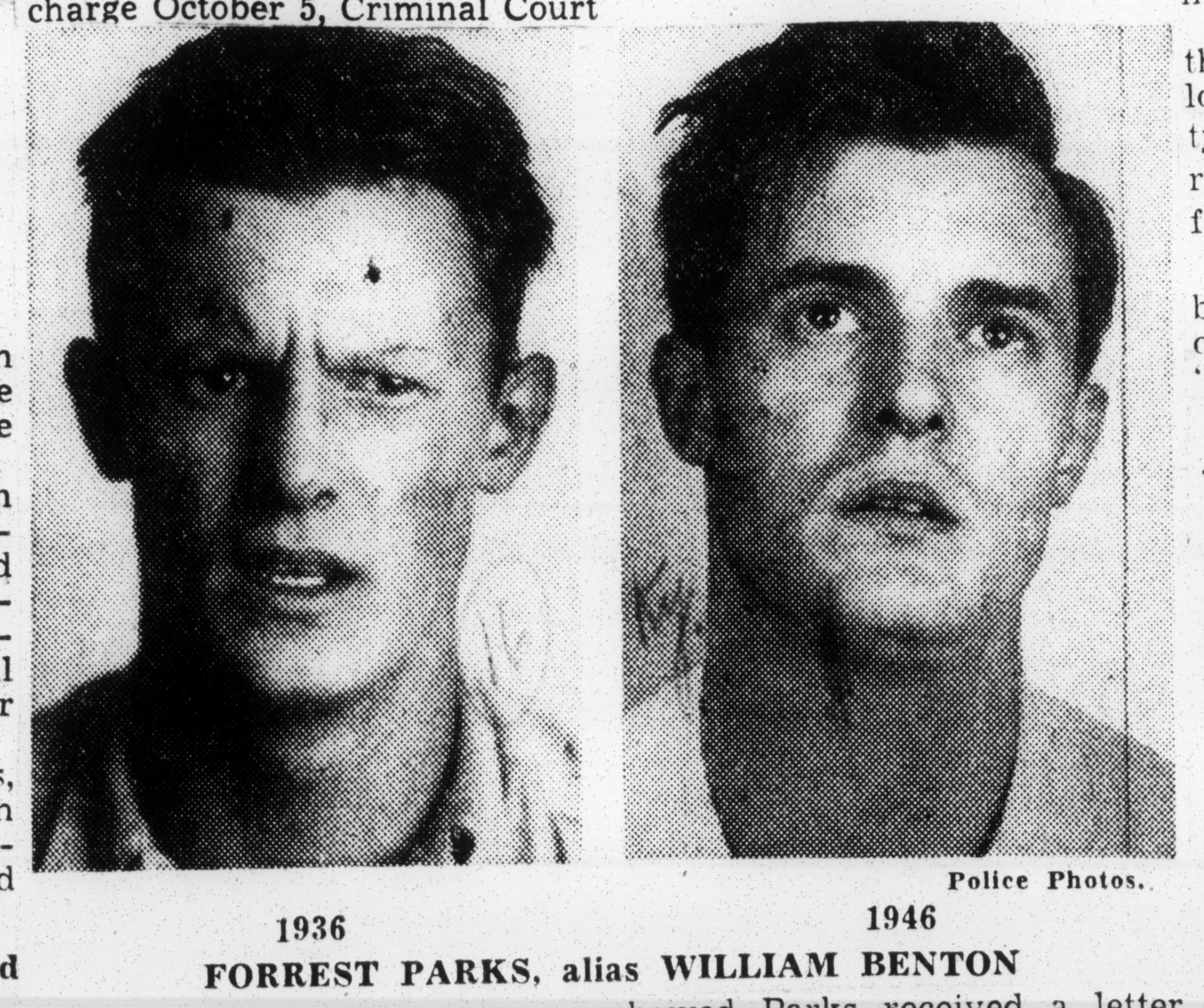
Mug shots of Forrest Parks of Louisville, Kentucky in 1936, when he was arrested for robbery, and 1946, when he was arrested for gambling under the alias "William Benton"

Criminals may use aliases, fictitious business names, and dummy corporations (corporate shells) to hide their identity, or to impersonate other persons or entities in order to commit fraud. Aliases and fictitious business names used for dummy corporations may become so complex that, in the words of The Washington Post, "getting to the truth requires a walk down a bizarre labyrinth" and multiple government agencies may become involved to uncover the truth. Giving a false name to a law enforcement officer is a crime in many jurisdictions.

==== Literature ====
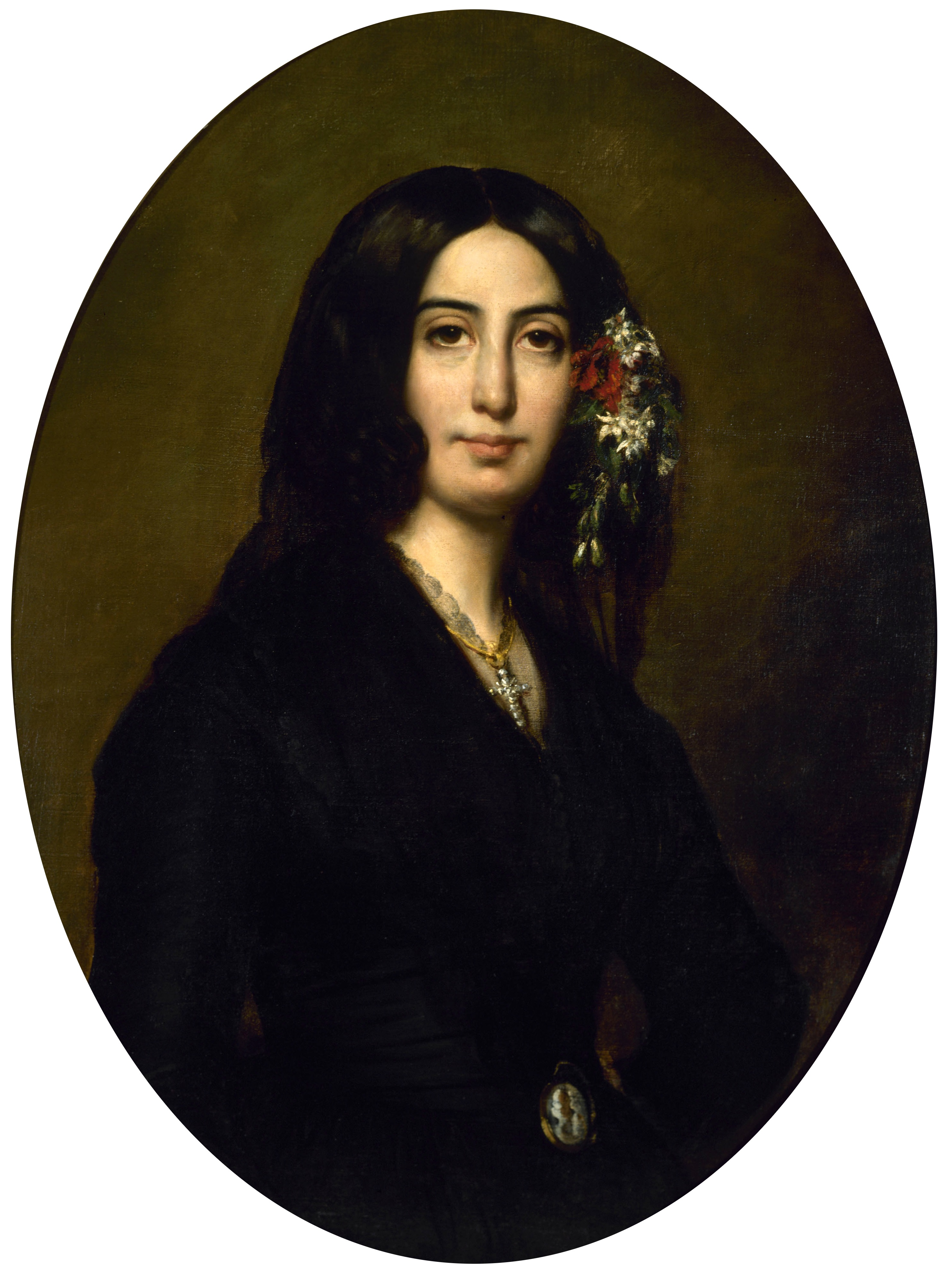
A young George Sand (real name "Amantine Lucile Dupin")

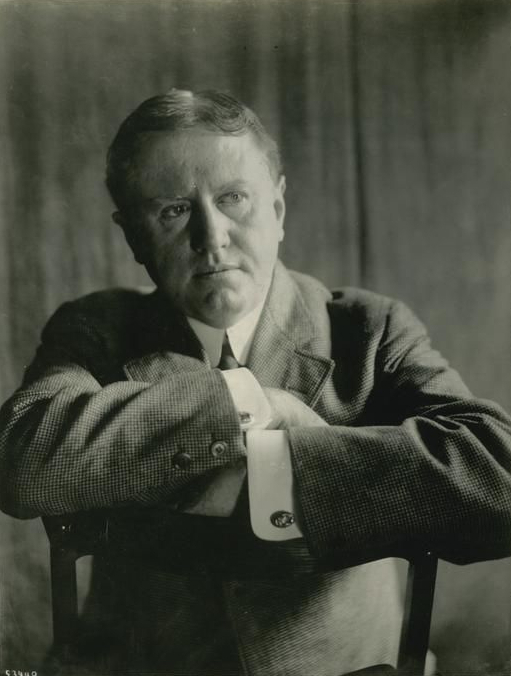
William Sydney Porter, who went by the pen name O. Henry or Olivier Henry, in 1909

A pen name is a pseudonym (sometimes a particular form of the real name) adopted by an author (or on the author's behalf by their publishers). English usage also includes the French-language phrase nom de plume (which in French literally means "pen name").

The concept of pseudonymity has a long history. In ancient literature it was common to write in the name of a famous person, not for concealment or with any intention of deceit; in the New Testament, the second letter of Peter is probably such. A more modern example is all of The Federalist Papers, which were signed by Publius, a pseudonym representing the trio of James Madison, Alexander Hamilton, and John Jay. The papers were written partially in response to several Anti-Federalist Papers, also written under pseudonyms. As a result of this pseudonymity, historians know that the papers were written by Madison, Hamilton, and Jay, but have not been able to discern with certainty which of the three authored a few of the papers. There are also examples of modern politicians and high-ranking bureaucrats writing under pseudonyms.

Some female authors have used male pen names, in particular in the 19th century, when writing was a highly male-dominated profession. The Brontë sisters used pen names for their early work, so as not to reveal their gender (see below) and so that local residents would not suspect that the books related to people of their neighbourhood. Anne Brontë's The Tenant of Wildfell Hall (1848) was published under the name Acton Bell, while Charlotte Brontë used the name Currer Bell for Jane Eyre (1847) and Shirley (1849), and Emily Brontë adopted Ellis Bell as cover for Wuthering Heights (1847). Other examples from the nineteenth-century are novelist Mary Ann Evans (George Eliot) and French writer Amandine Aurore Lucile Dupin (George Sand). Pseudonyms may also be used due to cultural, organizational or political prejudices.

Similarly, some 20th- and 21st-century male romance novelists – a field dominated by women – have used female pen names. A few examples are Brindle Chase, Peter O'Donnell (as Madeline Brent), Christopher Wood (as Penny Sutton and Rosie Dixon), and Hugh C. Rae (as Jessica Sterling).

A pen name may be used if a writer's real name is likely to be confused with the name of another writer or notable individual, or if the real name is deemed unsuitable.

Authors who write both fiction and non-fiction, or in different genres, may use different pen names to avoid confusing their readers. For example, the romance writer Nora Roberts writes mystery novels under the name J. D. Robb.

In some cases, an author may become better known by their pen name, rather than their real name. Some famous examples of that include Samuel Clemens, writing as Mark Twain, Theodor Geisel, better known as Dr. Seuss, and Eric Arthur Blair (George Orwell). The British mathematician Charles Dodgson wrote fantasy novels as Lewis Carroll and mathematical treatises under his own name.

Some authors, such as Harold Robbins, use several literary pseudonyms.

Some pen names have been used for long periods, even decades, without the author's true identity being discovered, as with Elena Ferrante and Torsten Krol.

Joanne Rowling published the Harry Potter series as J. K. Rowling. Rowling also published the Cormoran Strike series of detective novels including The Cuckoo's Calling under the pseudonym Robert Galbraith.

Winston Churchill wrote as Winston S. Churchill (from his full surname Spencer Churchill which he did not otherwise use) in an attempt to avoid confusion with an American novelist of the same name. The attempt was not wholly successful – the two are still sometimes confused by booksellers.

A pen name may be used specifically to hide the identity of the author, as with exposé books about espionage or crime, or explicit erotic fiction. Erwin von Busse used a pseudonym when he published short stories about sexually charged encounters between men in Germany in 1920. Some prolific authors adopt a pseudonym to disguise the extent of their published output, e. g. Stephen King writing as Richard Bachman. Co-authors may choose to publish under a collective pseudonym, e. g., P. J. Tracy and Perri O'Shaughnessy. Frederic Dannay and Manfred Lee used the name Ellery Queen as a pen name for their collaborative works and as the name of their main character. Asa Earl Carter, a Southern white segregationist affiliated with the KKK, wrote Western books under a fictional Cherokee persona to imply legitimacy and conceal his history.

A famous case in French literature was Romain Gary. Already a well-known writer, he started publishing books as Émile Ajar to test whether his new books would be well received on their own merits, without the aid of his established reputation. They were: Émile Ajar, like Romain Gary before him, was awarded the prestigious Prix Goncourt by a jury unaware that they were the same person. Similarly, TV actor Ronnie Barker submitted comedy material under the name Gerald Wiley.

A collective pseudonym may represent an entire publishing house, or any contributor to a long-running series, especially with juvenile literature. Examples include Watty Piper, Victor Appleton, Erin Hunter, and Kamiru M. Xhan.

Another use of a pseudonym in literature is to present a story as being written by the fictional characters in the story. The series of novels known as A Series of Unfortunate Events are written by Daniel Handler under the pen name of Lemony Snicket, a character in the series. This applies also to some of the several 18th-century English and American writers who used the name Fidelia.

An anonymity pseudonym or multiple-use name is a name used by many different people to protect anonymity. It is a strategy that has been adopted by many unconnected radical groups and by cultural groups, where the construct of personal identity has been criticised. This has led to the idea of the "open pop star", such as Monty Cantsin.

==== Medicine ====
Pseudonyms and acronyms are often employed in medical research to protect subjects' identities through a process known as de-identification.

==== Science ====
Nicolaus Copernicus put forward his theory of heliocentrism in the manuscript Commentariolus anonymously, in part because of his employment as a law clerk for a church-government organization.

Sophie Germain and William Sealy Gosset used pseudonyms to publish their work in the field of mathematics – Germain, to avoid rampant 19th century academic misogyny, and Gosset, to avoid revealing brewing practices of his employer, the Guinness Brewery.

Satoshi Nakamoto is a pseudonym of a still unknown author or authors' group behind a white paper about bitcoin.

==== Military and paramilitary organizations ====
While taking part in military activities, such as fighting in a war, the pseudonym might be known as a nom de guerre. It is chosen by the person involved in the activity.

==== Online activity ====
Individuals using a computer online may adopt or be required to use a form of pseudonym known as a "handle" (a term deriving from CB slang), "user name", "login name", "avatar", or, sometimes, "screen name", "gamertag", "IGN (In Game (Nick)Name)" or "nickname". On the Internet, pseudonymous remailers use cryptography that achieves persistent pseudonymity, so that two-way communication can be achieved, and reputations can be established, without linking physical identities to their respective pseudonyms. Aliasing is the use of multiple names for the same data location.

More sophisticated cryptographic systems, such as anonymous digital credentials, enable users to communicate pseudonymously (i.e., by identifying themselves by means of pseudonyms). In well-defined abuse cases, a designated authority may be able to revoke the pseudonyms and reveal the individuals' real identity.

Use of pseudonyms is common among professional eSports players, despite the fact that many professional games are played on LAN.

Pseudonymity has become an important phenomenon on the Internet and other computer networks. In computer networks, pseudonyms possess varying degrees of anonymity, ranging from highly linkable public pseudonyms (the link between the pseudonym and a human being is publicly known or easy to discover), potentially linkable non-public pseudonyms (the link is known to system operators but is not publicly disclosed), and unlinkable pseudonyms (the link is not known to system operators and cannot be determined). For example, true anonymous remailer enables Internet users to establish unlinkable pseudonyms; those that employ non-public pseudonyms (such as the now-defunct Penet remailer) are called pseudonymous remailers.

The continuum of unlinkability can also be seen, in part, on Wikipedia. Some registered users make no attempt to disguise their real identities (for example, by placing their real name on their user page). Until November 4, 2025, the pseudonym of unregistered users is their IP address, which can, in many cases, easily be linked to them. As a result, after the date in question, temporary accounts were invented and implemented on English Wikipedia. Other registered users prefer to remain anonymous, and do not disclose identifying information. However, in certain cases, Wikipedia's privacy policy permits system administrators to consult the server logs to determine the IP address, and perhaps the true name, of a registered user. It is possible, in theory, to create an unlinkable Wikipedia pseudonym by using an Open proxy, a web server that disguises the user's IP address. But most open proxy addresses are blocked indefinitely due to their frequent use by vandals. Additionally, Wikipedia's public record of a user's interest areas, writing style, and argumentative positions may still establish an identifiable pattern.

System operators (sysops) at sites offering pseudonymity, such as Wikipedia, are not likely to build unlinkability into their systems, as this would render them unable to obtain information about abusive users quickly enough to stop vandalism and other undesirable behaviors. Law enforcement personnel, fearing an avalanche of illegal behavior, are equally unenthusiastic. Still, some users and privacy activists like the American Civil Liberties Union believe that Internet users deserve stronger pseudonymity so that they can protect themselves against identity theft, illegal government surveillance, stalking, and other unwelcome consequences of Internet use (including unintentional disclosures of their personal information and doxing, as discussed in the next section). Their views are supported by laws in some nations (such as Canada) that guarantee citizens a right to speak using a pseudonym. This right does not, however, give citizens the right to demand publication of pseudonymous speech on equipment they do not own.

==== Confidentiality ====
Most websites that offer pseudonymity retain information about users. These sites are often susceptible to unauthorized intrusions into their non-public database systems. For example, in 2000, a Welsh teenager obtained information about more than 26,000 credit card accounts, including that of Bill Gates. In 2003, VISA and MasterCard announced that intruders obtained information about 5.6 million credit cards. Sites that offer pseudonymity are also vulnerable to confidentiality breaches. In a study of a Web dating service and a pseudonymous remailer, University of Cambridge researchers discovered that the systems used by these Web sites to protect user data could be easily compromised, even if the pseudonymous channel is protected by strong encryption. Typically, the protected pseudonymous channel exists within a broader framework in which multiple vulnerabilities exist. Pseudonym users should bear in mind that, given the current state of Web security engineering, their true names may be revealed at any time.

==== Online reputations ====
Pseudonymity is an important component of the reputation systems found in online auction services (such as eBay), discussion sites (such as Slashdot), and collaborative knowledge development sites (such as Wikipedia). A pseudonymous user who has acquired a favorable reputation gains the trust of other users. When users believe that they will be rewarded by acquiring a favorable reputation, they are more likely to behave in accordance with the site's policies.

If users can obtain new pseudonymous identities freely or at a very low cost, reputation-based systems are vulnerable to whitewashing attacks, also called serial pseudonymity, in which abusive users continuously discard their old identities and acquire new ones in order to escape the consequences of their behavior: "On the Internet, nobody knows that yesterday you were a dog, and therefore should be in the doghouse today." Users of Internet communities who have been banned only to return with new identities are called sock puppets. Whitewashing is one specific form of a Sybil attack on distributed systems.

Comment quality on Disqus by type

The social cost of cheaply discarded pseudonyms is that experienced users lose confidence in new users, and may subject new users to abuse until they establish a good reputation. System operators may need to remind experienced users that most newcomers are well-intentioned (see, for example, Wikipedia's policy about biting newcomers). Concerns have also been expressed about sock puppets exhausting the supply of easily remembered usernames. In addition a recent research paper demonstrated that people behave in a potentially more aggressive manner when using pseudonyms/nicknames (due to the online disinhibition effect) as opposed to being completely anonymous. In contrast, research by the blog comment hosting service Disqus found pseudonymous users contributed the "highest quantity and quality of comments", where "quality" is based on an aggregate of likes, replies, flags, spam reports, and comment deletions, and found that users trusted pseudonyms and real names equally.

Comment types used on HuffPost using different kinds of anonymity

Researchers at the University of Cambridge showed that pseudonymous comments tended to be more substantive and engaged with other users in explanations, justifications, and chains of argument, and less likely to use insults, than either fully anonymous or real name comments. Proposals have been made to raise the costs of obtaining new identities, such as by charging a small fee or requiring e-mail confirmation. Academic research has proposed cryptographic methods to pseudonymize social media identities or government-issued identities, to accrue and use anonymous reputation in online forums, or to obtain one-per-person and hence less readily-discardable pseudonyms periodically at physical-world pseudonym parties. Others point out that Wikipedia's success is attributable in large measure to its nearly non-existent initial participation costs.

==== Privacy ====
People seeking privacy often use pseudonyms to make appointments and reservations. Those writing to advice columns in newspapers and magazines may use pseudonyms. Steve Wozniak used a pseudonym when attending the University of California, Berkeley after co-founding Apple Computer, because "[he] knew [he] wouldn't have time enough to be an A+ student."

=== Stage names ===
When used by an actor, musician, radio disc jockey, model, or other performer or "show business" personality a pseudonym is called a stage name, or, occasionally, a professional name, or screen name.

==== Film, theatre, and related activities ====
Members of a marginalized ethnic or religious group have often adopted stage names, typically changing their surname or entire name to mask their original background.

Stage names are also used to create a more marketable name, as in the case of Creighton Tull Chaney, who adopted the pseudonym Lon Chaney Jr., a reference to his famous father Lon Chaney.

Chris Curtis of Deep Purple fame was christened as Christopher Crummey ("crummy" is UK slang for poor quality). In this and similar cases a stage name is adopted simply to avoid an unfortunate pun.

Pseudonyms are also used to comply with the rules of performing-arts guilds (Screen Actors Guild (SAG), Writers Guild of America, East (WGA), AFTRA, etc.), which do not allow performers to use an existing name, in order to avoid confusion. For example, these rules required film and television actor Michael Fox to add a middle initial and become Michael J. Fox, to avoid being confused with another actor named Michael Fox. This was also true of author and actress Fannie Flagg, who shared her real name, Patricia Neal, with another well-known actress; Rick Copp, who chose the pseudonym name Richard Hollis, which is also the name of a character in the anthology TV series Femme Fatales; and British actor Stewart Granger, whose real name was James Stewart. The film-making team of Joel and Ethan Coen, for instance, share credit for editing under the alias Roderick Jaynes.

Some stage names are used to conceal a person's identity, such as the pseudonym Alan Smithee, which was used by directors in the Directors Guild of America (DGA) to remove their name from a film they feel was edited or modified beyond their artistic satisfaction. In theatre, the pseudonyms George or Georgina Spelvin, and Walter Plinge are used to hide the identity of a performer, usually when he or she is "doubling" (playing more than one role in the same play).

David Agnew was a name used by the BBC to conceal the identity of a scriptwriter, such as for the Doctor Who serial City of Death, which had three writers, including Douglas Adams, who was at the time of writing, the show's script editor. In another Doctor Who serial, The Brain of Morbius, writer Terrance Dicks demanded the removal of his name from the credits saying it could go out under a "bland pseudonym". This ended up as "Robin Bland".

Pornographic actors regularly use stage names. Sometimes these are referred to as nom de porn (like with nom de plume, this is English-language users creating a French-language phrase to use in English). Having acted in pornographic films can be a serious detriment to finding another career.

==== Music ====
Musicians and singers can use pseudonyms to allow artists to collaborate with artists on other labels while avoiding the need to gain permission from their own labels, such as the artist Jerry Samuels, who made songs under Napoleon XIV. Rock singer-guitarist George Harrison, for example, played guitar on Cream's song "Badge" using a pseudonym. In classical music, some record companies issued recordings under a nom de disque in the 1950s and 1960s to avoid paying royalties. A number of popular budget LPs of piano music were released under the pseudonym Paul Procopolis. Another example is that Paul McCartney used his fictional name "Bernerd Webb" for Peter and Gordon's song Woman.

Pseudonyms are used as stage names in heavy metal bands, such as Tracii Guns in LA Guns, Axl Rose and Slash in Guns N' Roses, Mick Mars in Mötley Crüe, Dimebag Darrell in Pantera, or C.C. Deville in Poison. Some such names have additional meanings, like that of Brian Hugh Warner, more commonly known as Marilyn Manson: Marilyn coming from Marilyn Monroe and Manson from convicted serial killer Charles Manson. Jacoby Shaddix of Papa Roach went under the name "Coby Dick" during the Infest era. He changed back to his birth name when lovehatetragedy was released.

David Johansen, frontman for the hard rock band New York Dolls, recorded and performed pop and lounge music under the pseudonym Buster Poindexter in the late 1980s and early 1990s. The music video for Poindexter's debut single, Hot Hot Hot, opens with a monologue from Johansen where he notes his time with the New York Dolls and explains his desire to create more sophisticated music.

Ross Bagdasarian Sr., creator of Alvin and the Chipmunks, wrote original songs, arranged, and produced the records under his real name, but performed on them as David Seville. He also wrote songs as Skipper Adams. Danish pop pianist Bent Fabric, whose full name is Bent Fabricius-Bjerre, wrote his biggest instrumental hit "Alley Cat" as Frank Bjorn.

For a time, the musician Prince used an unpronounceable "Love Symbol" as a pseudonym ("Prince" is his actual first name rather than a stage name). He wrote the song "Sugar Walls" for Sheena Easton as "Alexander Nevermind" and "Manic Monday" for the Bangles as "Christopher Tracy". (He also produced albums early in his career as "Jamie Starr").

Many Italian-American singers have used stage names, as their birth names were difficult to pronounce or considered too ethnic for American tastes. Singers changing their names included Dean Martin (born Dino Paul Crocetti), Connie Francis (born Concetta Franconero), Frankie Valli (born Francesco Castelluccio), Tony Bennett (born Anthony Benedetto), and Lady Gaga (born Stefani Germanotta)

In 2009, the British rock band Feeder briefly changed their name to Renegades so they could play a whole show featuring a set list in which 95 per cent of the songs played were from their forthcoming new album of the same name, with none of their singles included. Frontman Grant Nicholas felt that if they played as Feeder, there would be an uproar over him not playing any of the singles, so he used the pseudonym as a hint. A series of small shows were played in 2010, at 250 to 1,000-capacity venues, with the plan to not say who the band really was, and to just announce the shows as if they were a new band.

In many cases, hip-hop and rap artists prefer to use pseudonyms that represents some variation of their name, personality, or interests. Examples include Iggy Azalea (her stage name is a combination of her dog's name, Iggy, and her home street in Mullumbimby, Azalea Street), Ol' Dirty Bastard (known under at least six aliases), Diddy (previously known at various times as Puffy, P. Diddy, and Puff Daddy), Ludacris, Flo Rida (whose stage name is a tribute to his home state, Florida), British-Jamaican hip-hop artist Stefflon Don (real name Stephanie Victoria Allen), LL Cool J, and Chingy. Black metal artists also adopt pseudonyms, usually symbolizing dark values, such as Nocturno Culto, Gaahl, Abbath, and Silenoz. In punk and hardcore punk, singers and band members often replace real names with tougher-sounding stage names such as Sid Vicious of the late 1970s band Sex Pistols and "Rat" of the early 1980s band The Varukers and the 2000s re-formation of Discharge. The punk rock band The Ramones had every member take the last name of Ramone.

Henry John Deutschendorf Jr., an American singer-songwriter, used the stage name John Denver. The Australian country musician born Robert Lane changed his name to Tex Morton. Reginald Kenneth Dwight legally changed his name in 1972 to Elton John.

== See also ==
- Alter ego
- Anonymity
- Anonymous post
- Anonymous remailer
- Bugō
- Courtesy name
- Code name
- Confidentiality
- Data haven
- Digital signature
- Friend-to-friend
- Heteronym
- Horse name
- Hypocorism
- John Doe
- List of Latinised names
- List of pseudonyms
- List of pseudonyms used in the American Constitutional debates
- List of stage names
- Mononymous person
- Nickname
- Nym server
- Nymwars
- Onion routing
- Penet.fi
- Placeholder names in cryptography
- Pseudepigrapha
- Pseudonymization
- Pseudonymous Bosch
- Pseudonymous remailer
- Public key encryption
- Ring name
- Secret identity
- Stage name
- Takhallus
- Trade name

== Sources ==
- Case, Bettye Anne; Leggett, Anne M. (2005). Complexities: Women in Mathematics. Princeton University Press. ISBN 0-691-11462-5.
- Gröndahl, Tommi; Asokan, N. (2020). "Text Analysis in Adversarial Settings: Does Deception Leave a Stylistic Trace?". ACM Computing Surveys. 52 (3): 1–36. arXiv:1902.08939. doi:10.1145/3310331. S2CID 67856540.
- Peschke, Michael (2006). International Encyclopedia of Pseudonyms. Detroit: Gale. ISBN 978-3-598-24960-0.
- Room, Adrian (2010). Dictionary of Pseudonyms: 13,000 Assumed Names and Their Origins (5th revised ed.). Jefferson, North Carolina: McFarland & Co. ISBN 978-0-7864-4373-4.
