= CodeCon =

CodeCon was an annual conference for software hackers and technology enthusiasts, held every year between 2002 and 2009. CodeCon was not intended to be a computer security conference, but a conference with a focus on software developers doing presentations of technologies, as computer programs, rather than products.

== History ==
Bram Cohen and Len Sassaman are credited with devising and organizing the first conference at the DNA Lounge in San Francisco, California in 2002. The conference was the result of discussion on building a small, programmer-focused convention. Some projects discussed at the first CodeCon include BitTorrent and Peek-a-Booty. There were also panel discussions, including one about the legality of hacking, which focused on the actions of the MPAA and RIAA against peer-to-peer file sharing networks.

Later conferences have included discussions on P2P (CodeCon 2.0) and the Helios Voting system (CodeCon 2009).

Sassaman proposed to his then-girlfriend Meredith L. Patterson during the Q&A after her presentation (Query By Example - Data mining operations within PostgreSQL) at the 2006 CodeCon; the two were later married.

== Other uses ==
Bloomberg's CodeCon programming contest platform and events.

An abbreviation for Re/code's Code Conference.
