= Present weather sensor =

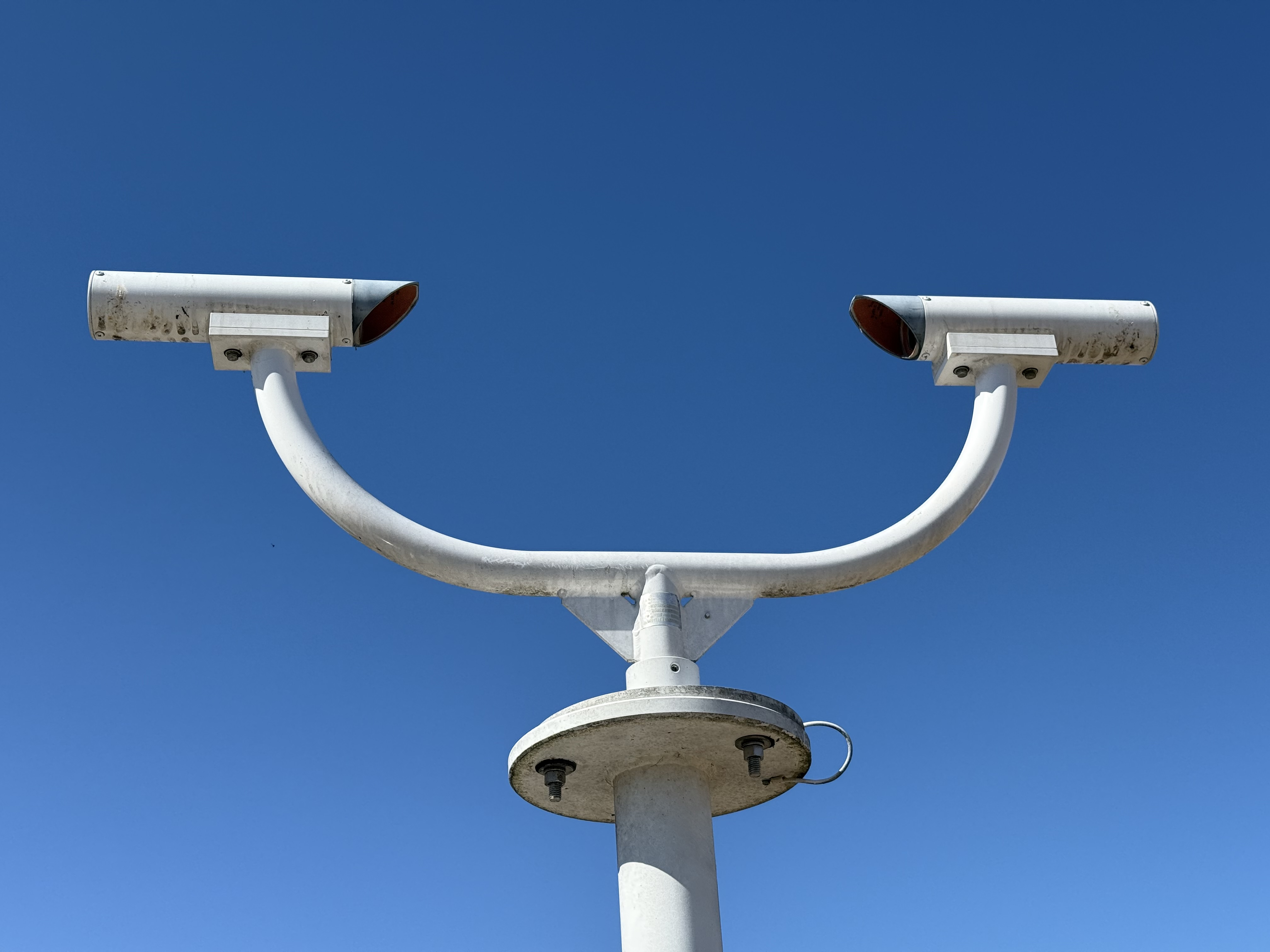
National Weather Service Automated Surface Observing System (ASOS) present weather sensor

A present weather sensor (PWS) is a component of an automatic weather station that detects the presence of hydrometeors and determines their type (rain, snow, drizzle, etc.) and intensity. It works on a principle similar to a bistatic radar, noting the passage of droplets, or flakes, between a transmitter and a sensor. These instruments in automatic weather stations are used to simulate the observation taken by a human observer, and allow rapid reporting of any change in the type and intensity of precipitation, but include interpretation limitations.

== Principle ==
=== Types ===
There are at least two types of devices used to detect precipitation:

- A light emitting diode weather identifier (LEDWI) sensor measures the scintillation pattern of the precipitation falling through the sensor's infrared beam (approximately 50 millimeters in diameter) and determines from a pattern analysis of the particle size and fall velocity whether the precipitation is rain or snow.
- The POSS (Precipitation Observation Sensor System) is a small bistatic Doppler radar. The transmitter aims upwards at a certain angle from a receiver oriented towards the volume probed and which picks up the signal backscattered by hydrometeors or other reflective particles in its detection volume. The device can thus measure the fall speed of targets by the Doppler effect and its intensity by its reflectivity. An analyzer then takes a weighted average of the last 15 polls over one minute to draw significant information.

=== Data processing ===
With the speed of fall and the size of the particles, it is then possible to determine the type of precipitation (rain falls much faster than snowflakes for example) with a contingency table. The detector will report the type of precipitation with the largest population in the samples. However, in some cases, the characteristics of two types of precipitation may be similar (drizzle and snow fall at speeds very close to each other), or there may be a mixture of precipitation (e.g. rain and melting snow).

To refine detection in the event of ambiguity, these devices use the dew point temperature (or, if missing, environmental temperature) and the icing detector output. Thus, if the detector identifies the falling speed for the dual snow/drizzle at an ambient dew point greater than 1 °C (34 °F) it will classify it as drizzle, and below −1 °C (30 °F), it will be snow. The icing detector will also be used to determine if rain or drizzle is freezing when the temperature is below freezing.

When these additional data still do not make it possible to differentiate (e.g. if the dew point of the previous example is between −1 and 1 °C), the type is then reported as "unknown". Thus at the moment, these devices cannot report hail, ice pellets, and various other intermediate forms of precipitation.

The instantaneous intensity of precipitation is calculated by the intensity of the scintillation (LED sensor) or the reflectivity (POSS). It is reported as very weak, weak, moderate or strong.

== Frequency of reporting ==
Automatic stations report on a regular schedule depending on their use, most reporting hourly. However, they will issue a special report if one or more of their sensors detects a significant change in weather conditions. Such specials are issued when precipitation of at least low intensity starts or stops, or the type of precipitation changes.

The present weather sensor takes samples every minute and the automatic station processing system stores them for 15 minutes. A special will be broadcast when at least three precipitation detections are made in 15 minutes for the start, if at least 12 minutes pass without precipitation, or if the intensity variation corresponds to a significant change.

== Limitations ==
The detail of mixed precipitation is not generally possible as the sensor is giving only the dominant one. The report is only valid at the sensor position, it will thus miss precipitation further afield that can be significant. Finally, it cannot by itself distinguish showers from continuous rain/snow.

False observations of precipitation are generally due to:

- Interference by radio frequency or light beams;
- Birds or insects passing through the beam;
- Blowing dust, snow or sand lifted by the wind;
- Thermal bubbles.
- Ambiguous situations where the contingency table cannot correctly determine the type.

== Enhancements ==
Thundershowers and continuous precipitation can be separated by using a lightning detector with the sensor result. Ground-based and mobile detectors obtain the direction and severity of lightning.

Scatterometers and transmissometers, where the extinction of a visual signal through air from a source to a receiver is noted, will give the horizontal visibility. In case there is no precipitation reported by the PWS, this will be revert the conclusion to fog or haze.

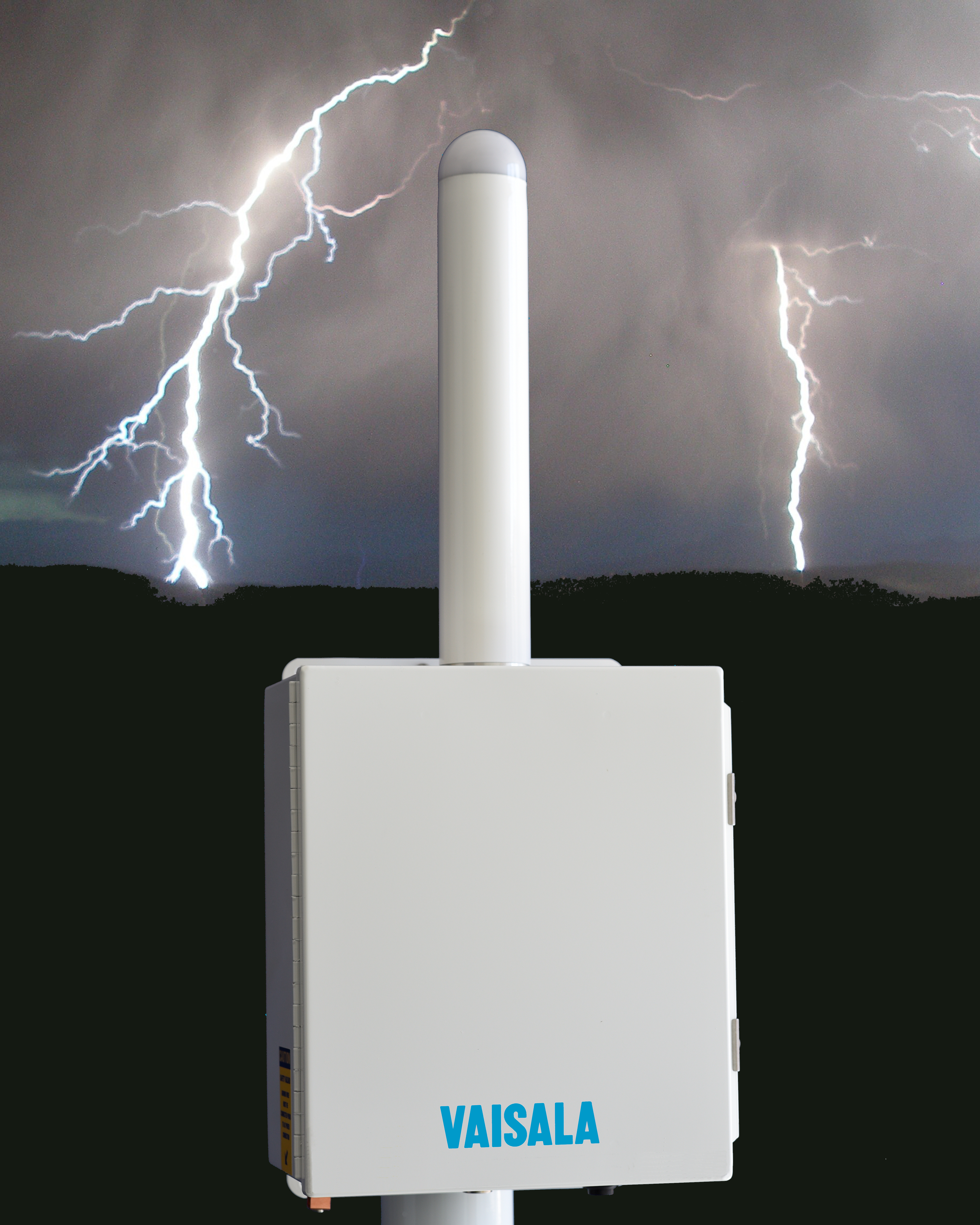
Lightning sensor.

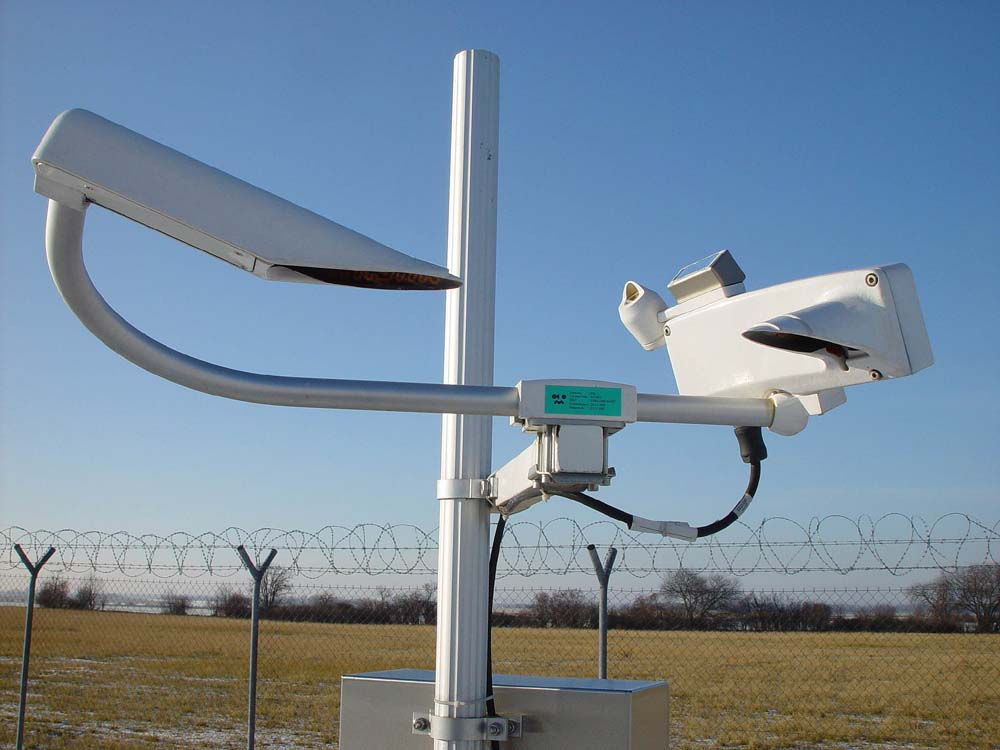
Airport scatterometer (or diffusometer).

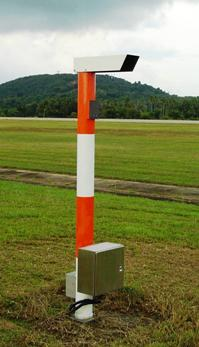
Transmissometer providing runway visual range (RVR) information.
