= KPNQwest =

Telecommunications company (1999–2002)

- Founded: 1999
- Defunct: 2002
- Website: kpnqwest.com at the Wayback Machine (archived 2002-06-01)

KPNQwest N.V. was a telecommunications company equally owned by the Dutch national telecom operator KPN and Qwest Communications International Inc., the Internet communications company, headquartered in Denver, Colorado.

The company was set to bring together the state-of-the-art fibre-optic networks of the two partners and the Internet services expertise and customer base of EUnet International. The company planned to build and operate a high-capacity European fibre optic, Internet Protocol-based network that was to span 13,000 kilometers when completed 2001.

During its history of less than four years, KPNQwest created a unique, nothing-is-impossible working spirit and company culture among its 2,500 employees under the leadership of an AT&T veteran Jack McMaster.

The company collapsed in a spectacular bankruptcy in 2002. The bankruptcy was largely due to the general Dot-com boom, which created highly inflated capacity demands for telecom operators. Facing this situation, many operators started to make large network capacity deals with each other, called hollow swaps. These swaps created artificial revenue figures and thus provided incorrect financial guidance to the company management and investors.

In year 2000 it was estimated that KPNQwest backbone was carrying more than 50% of European IP traffic.

As of 2018, KPNQwest Italia is still in business: a subsidiary of KPNQwest NV in 2000, it became autonomous in 2003 (ex COMM2000).
