= Mixmaster anonymous remailer =

Software

Mixmaster
- Original author: Lance Cottrell
- Developers: Len Sassaman and Peter Palfrader
- Stable release: 3.0 / March 3, 2008
- Type: Anonymous remailer
- Website: https://mixmaster.sourceforge.net/

Mixmaster is a Type II anonymous remailer which sends messages in fixed-size packets and reorders them, preventing anyone watching the messages go in and out of remailers from tracing them. It is an implementation of a David Chaum's mix network.

== History ==
Mixmaster was originally written by Lance Cottrell, and was maintained by Len Sassaman. Peter Palfrader is the current maintainer. Current Mixmaster software can be compiled to handle Cypherpunk messages as well; they are needed as reply blocks for nym servers.

Support for Mixmaster was removed from the Neomutt fork of the Mutt mail client in 2024 because the project did not seem active anymore.

== See also ==
- Anonymity
  - Anonymous P2P
  - Anonymous remailer
    - Cypherpunk anonymous remailer (Type I)
    - Mixminion (Type III)
  - Onion routing
    - Tor (network)
  - Pseudonymous remailer (a.k.a. nym servers)
    - Penet remailer
- Data privacy
- Traffic analysis
