= Cypherpunk =

Activist advocating widespread use of strong cryptography

A cypherpunk is one who advocates the widespread use of strong cryptography and privacy-enhancing technologies as a means of effecting social and political change. The cypherpunk movement originated in the late 1980s and gained traction with the establishment of the "Cypherpunks" electronic mailing list in 1992, where informal groups of activists, technologists, and cryptographers discussed strategies to enhance individual privacy and resist state or corporate surveillance. Deeply libertarian in philosophy, the movement is rooted in principles of decentralization, individual autonomy, and freedom from centralized authority. Its influence on society extends to the development of technologies that have reshaped global finance, communication, and privacy practices, such as the creation of Bitcoin and other cryptocurrencies, which embody cypherpunk ideals of decentralized money.

The movement has also contributed to the mainstreaming of encryption in everyday technologies, such as secure messaging apps and privacy-focused web browsers.

== History ==
=== Before the mailing list ===
Until about the 1970s, cryptography was mainly practiced in secret by military or spy agencies. However, that changed when two publications brought it into public awareness: the first publicly available work on public-key cryptography, by Whitfield Diffie and Martin Hellman, and the US government publication of the Data Encryption Standard (DES), a block cipher which became very widely used.

The technical roots of Cypherpunk ideas have been traced back to work by cryptographer David Chaum on topics such as anonymous digital cash and pseudonymous reputation systems, described in his paper "Security without Identification: Transaction Systems to Make Big Brother Obsolete" (1985).

In the late 1980s, these ideas coalesced into something like a movement.

=== Etymology and the Cypherpunks mailing list ===
In late 1992, Eric Hughes, Timothy C. May, and John Gilmore founded a small group that met monthly at Gilmore's company Cygnus Solutions in the San Francisco Bay Area and was humorously termed cypherpunks by Jude Milhon at one of the first meetings—derived from cipher and cyberpunk. In November 2006, the word was added to the Oxford English Dictionary.The Cypherpunks mailing list was started in 1992, and by 1994 had 700 subscribers. At its peak, it was a very active forum with technical discussions ranging over mathematics, cryptography, computer science, political and philosophical discussion, personal arguments and attacks, etc., with some spam thrown in. An email from John Gilmore reports an average of 30 messages a day from December 1, 1996, to March 1, 1999, and suggests that the number was probably higher earlier. The number of subscribers is estimated to have reached 2,000 in the year 1997.

In early 1997, Jim Choate and Igor Chudov set up the Cypherpunks Distributed Remailer, a network of independent mailing list nodes intended to eliminate the single point of failure inherent in a centralized list architecture. At its peak, the Cypherpunks Distributed Remailer included at least seven nodes. By mid-2005, al-qaeda.net (Riad S. Wahby) ran the only remaining node. In mid-2013, following a brief outage, the al-qaeda.net node's list software was changed from Majordomo to GNU Mailman, and subsequently the node was renamed to cpunks.org. The CDR architecture is now defunct, though the list administrator stated in 2013 that he was exploring a way to integrate this functionality with the new mailing list software.

For a time, the cypherpunks mailing list was a popular tool with mailbombers, who would subscribe a victim to the mailing list in order to cause a deluge of messages to be sent to them (usually as a prank, in contrast to the style of terrorist referred to as a mailbomber). This precipitated the mailing list sysop(s) to institute a reply-to-subscribe system. Approximately two hundred messages a day was typical for the mailing list, divided between personal arguments and attacks, political discussion, technical discussion, and early spam.

The cypherpunks mailing list had extensive discussions of the public policy issues related to cryptography and on the politics and philosophy of concepts such as anonymity, pseudonyms, reputation, and privacy. These discussions continue both on the remaining node and elsewhere as the list has become increasingly moribund.

Events such as the GURPS Cyberpunk raid lent weight to the idea that private individuals needed to take steps to protect their privacy. In its heyday, the list discussed public policy issues related to cryptography, as well as more practical nuts-and-bolts mathematical, computational, technological, and cryptographic matters. The list had a range of viewpoints and there was probably no completely unanimous agreement on anything. The general attitude, though, definitely put personal privacy and personal liberty above all other considerations.

==== Early discussion of online privacy ====
The list was discussing questions about privacy, government monitoring, corporate control of information, and related issues in the early 1990s that did not become major topics for broader discussion until at least ten years later. Some list participants were highly radical on these issues.

Those wishing to understand the context of the list might refer to the history of cryptography; in the early 1990s, the US government considered cryptography software a munition for export purposes (PGP source code was published as a paper book to bypass these regulations and demonstrate their futility). In 1992, a deal between NSA and SPA allowed export of cryptography based on 40-bit RC2 and RC4 which was considered relatively weak (and especially after SSL was created, there were many contests to break it). The US government had also tried to subvert cryptography through schemes such as Skipjack and key escrow. It was also not widely known that all communications were logged by government agencies (which would later be revealed during the NSA and AT&T scandals) though this was taken as an obvious axiom by list members.

The original cypherpunk mailing list, and the first list spin-off, coderpunks, were originally hosted on John Gilmore's toad.com, but after a falling out with the sysop over moderation, the list was migrated to several cross-linked mail-servers in what was called the "distributed mailing list." The coderpunks list, open by invitation only, existed for a time. Coderpunks took up more technical matters and had less discussion of public policy implications. There are several lists today that can trace their lineage directly to the original Cypherpunks list: the cryptography list (cryptography@metzdowd.com), the financial cryptography list (fc-announce@ifca.ai), and a small group of closed (invitation-only) lists as well.

Toad.com continued to run with the existing subscriber list, those that didn't unsubscribe, and was mirrored on the new distributed mailing list, but messages from the distributed list didn't appear on toad.com. As the list faded in popularity, so too did it fade in the number of cross-linked subscription nodes.

To some extent, the cryptography list acts as a successor to cypherpunks; it has many of the people and continues some of the same discussions. However, it is a moderated list, considerably less zany and somewhat more technical. A number of current systems in use trace to the mailing list, including Pretty Good Privacy, /dev/random in the Linux kernel (the actual code has been completely reimplemented several times since then) and today's anonymous remailers.

== Main principles ==
The basic ideas can be found in A Cypherpunk's Manifesto (Eric Hughes, 1993): "Privacy is necessary for an open society in the electronic age. ... We cannot expect governments, corporations, or other large, faceless organizations to grant us privacy ... We must defend our own privacy if we expect to have any. ... Cypherpunks write code. We know that someone has to write software to defend privacy, and ... we're going to write it."

Some are or were senior people at major hi-tech companies and others are well-known researchers (see list with affiliations below).

The first mass media discussion of cypherpunks was in Crypto Rebels, a 1993 Wired article by Steven Levy. The three masked men on the cover of that edition of Wired were prominent cypherpunks Tim May, Eric Hughes and John Gilmore. Later, Levy wrote a book, Crypto: How the Code Rebels Beat the Government – Saving Privacy in the Digital Age, covering the crypto wars of the 1990s in detail. "Code Rebels" in the title is almost synonymous with cypherpunks.

The term cypherpunk is mildly ambiguous. In most contexts it means anyone advocating cryptography as a tool for social change, social impact and expression. However, it can also be used to mean a participant in the Cypherpunks electronic mailing list described below. The two meanings obviously overlap, but they are by no means synonymous.

Documents exemplifying cypherpunk ideas include Timothy C. May's The Crypto Anarchist Manifesto (1992) and The Cyphernomicon (1994), A Cypherpunk's Manifesto.

=== Privacy of communications ===
A very basic cypherpunk issue is privacy in communications and data retention. John Gilmore said he wanted "a guarantee – with physics and mathematics, not with laws – that we can give ourselves real privacy of personal communications."

Such guarantees require strong cryptography, so cypherpunks are fundamentally opposed to government policies attempting to control the usage or export of cryptography, which remained an issue throughout the late 1990s. The Cypherpunk Manifesto stated "Cypherpunks deplore regulations on cryptography, for encryption is fundamentally a private act."

This was a central issue for many cypherpunks. Most were passionately opposed to various government attempts to limit cryptography—export laws, promotion of limited key length ciphers, and especially escrowed encryption.

=== Anonymity and pseudonyms ===
The questions of anonymity, pseudonymity and reputation were also extensively discussed.

Most cypherpunks have the position that the possibility of anonymous speech and publication is crucial for an open society and genuine freedom of speech.

=== Censorship and monitoring ===
In general, cypherpunks opposed the censorship and monitoring from government and police.

In particular, the US government's Clipper chip scheme for escrowed encryption of telephone conversations (encryption supposedly secure against most attackers, but breakable by government) was seen as anathema by many on the list. This was an issue that provoked strong opposition and brought many new recruits to the cypherpunk ranks. List participant Matt Blaze found a serious flaw in the scheme, helping to hasten its demise.

Steven Schear first suggested the warrant canary in 2002 to thwart the secrecy provisions of court orders and national security letters. As of 2013, warrant canaries are gaining commercial acceptance.

=== Hiding the act of hiding ===
An important set of discussions concerns the use of cryptography in the presence of oppressive authorities. As a result, Cypherpunks have discussed and improved steganographic methods that hide the use of crypto itself, or that allow interrogators to believe that they have forcibly extracted hidden information from a subject. For instance, Rubberhose was a tool that partitioned and intermixed secret data on a drive with fake secret data, each of which accessed via a different password. Interrogators, having extracted a password, are led to believe that they have indeed unlocked the desired secrets, whereas in reality the actual data is still hidden. In other words, even its presence is hidden. Likewise, cypherpunks have also discussed under what conditions encryption may be used without being noticed by network monitoring systems installed by oppressive regimes.

== Activities ==
As the Manifesto says, "Cypherpunks write code"; the notion that good ideas need to be implemented, not just discussed, is very much part of the culture of the mailing list. John Gilmore, whose site hosted the original cypherpunks mailing list, wrote: "We are literally in a race between our ability to build and deploy technology, and their ability to build and deploy laws and treaties. Neither side is likely to back down or wise up until it has definitively lost the race."

=== Software projects ===
Anonymous remailers such as the Mixmaster Remailer were almost entirely a cypherpunk development. Other cypherpunk-related projects include PGP for email privacy, FreeS/WAN for opportunistic encryption of the whole net, Off-the-record messaging for privacy in Internet chat, and the Tor project for anonymous web surfing.

=== Hardware ===
In 1998, the Electronic Frontier Foundation, with assistance from the mailing list, built a $200,000 machine that could brute-force a Data Encryption Standard key in a few days. The project demonstrated that DES was, without question, insecure and obsolete, in sharp contrast to the US government's recommendation of the algorithm.

=== Expert panels ===
Cypherpunks also participated, along with other experts, in several reports on cryptographic matters.

One such paper was "Minimal Key Lengths for Symmetric Ciphers to Provide Adequate Commercial Security". It suggested 75 bits was the minimum key size to allow an existing cipher to be considered secure and kept in service. At the time, the Data Encryption Standard with 56-bit keys was still a US government standard, mandatory for some applications.

Other papers were critical analysis of government schemes. "The Risks of Key Recovery, Key Escrow, and Trusted Third-Party Encryption", evaluated escrowed encryption proposals. Comments on the Carnivore System Technical Review. looked at an FBI scheme for monitoring email.

Cypherpunks provided significant input to the 1996 National Research Council report on encryption policy, Cryptography's Role In Securing the Information Society (CRISIS). This report, commissioned by the U.S. Congress in 1993, was developed via extensive hearings across the nation from all interested stakeholders, by a committee of talented people. It recommended a gradual relaxation of the existing U.S. government restrictions on encryption. Like many such study reports, its conclusions were largely ignored by policy-makers. Later events such as the final rulings in the cypherpunks lawsuits forced a more complete relaxation of the unconstitutional controls on encryption software.

=== Lawsuits ===
Cypherpunks have filed a number of lawsuits, mostly suits against the US government alleging that some government action is unconstitutional.

Phil Karn sued the State Department in 1994 over cryptography export controls after they ruled that, while the book Applied Cryptography could legally be exported, a floppy disk containing a verbatim copy of code printed in the book was legally a munition and required an export permit, which they refused to grant. Karn also appeared before both House and Senate committees looking at cryptography issues.

Daniel J. Bernstein, supported by the EFF, also sued over the export restrictions, arguing that preventing publication of cryptographic source code is an unconstitutional restriction on freedom of speech. He won, effectively overturning the export law. See Bernstein v. United States for details.

Peter Junger also sued on similar grounds, and won.

=== Civil disobedience ===
Cypherpunks encouraged civil disobedience, in particular, US law on the export of cryptography. Until 1997, cryptographic code was legally a munition and fell under ITAR, and the key length restrictions in the EAR was not removed until 2000.

In 1995 Adam Back wrote a version of the RSA algorithm for public-key cryptography in three lines of Perl and suggested people use it as an email signature file:

# !/bin/perl -sp0777i<X+d*lMLa^*lN%0]dsXx++lMlN/dsM0<j]dsj
$/=unpack('H*',$_);$_=`echo 16dio\U$k"SK$/SM$n\EsN0p[lN*1
lK[d2%Sa2/d0$^Ixp"|dc`;s/\W//g;$_=pack('H*',/((..)*)$/)

Vince Cate put up a web page that invited anyone to become an international arms trafficker; every time someone clicked on the form, an export-restricted item—originally PGP, later a copy of Back's program—would be mailed from a US server to one in Anguilla.

=== Cypherpunk fiction ===
In Neal Stephenson's novel Cryptonomicon many characters are on the "Secret Admirers" mailing list. This is fairly obviously based on the cypherpunks list, and several well-known cypherpunks are mentioned in the acknowledgements. Much of the plot revolves around cypherpunk ideas; the leading characters are building a data haven which will allow anonymous financial transactions, and the book is full of cryptography. But, according to the author the book's title is—in spite of its similarity—not based on the Cyphernomicon, an online cypherpunk FAQ document.

=== Legacy ===
Cypherpunk achievements would later also be used on the Canadian e-wallet, the MintChip, and the creation of bitcoin. It was an inspiration for CryptoParty decades later to such an extent that A Cypherpunk's Manifesto is quoted at the header of its Wiki, and Eric Hughes delivered the keynote address at the Amsterdam CryptoParty on 27 August 2012.

== Notable cypherpunks ==
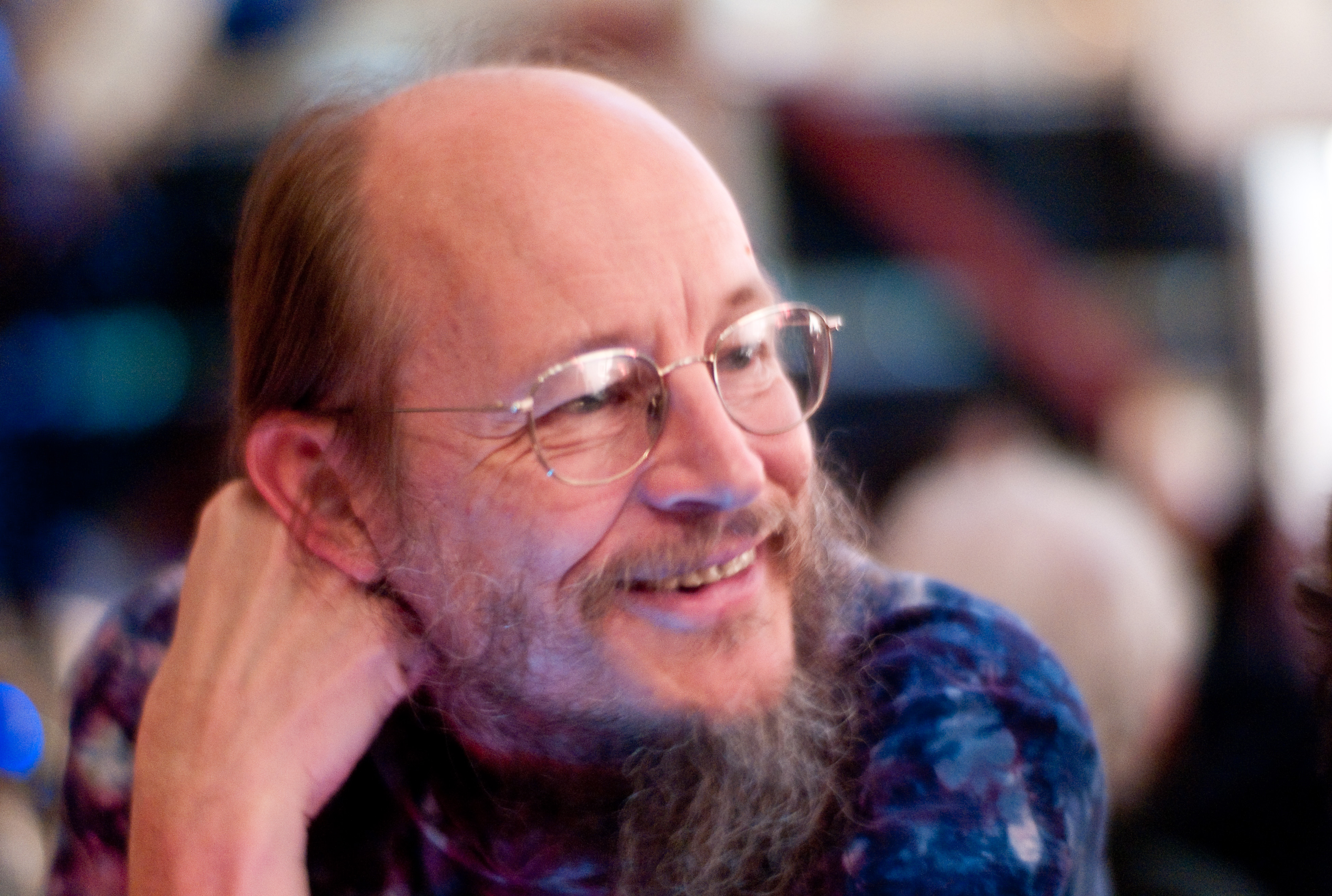
John Gilmore is one of the founders of the Cypherpunks mailing list, the Electronic Frontier Foundation, and Cygnus Solutions. He created the alt.* hierarchy in Usenet and is a major contributor to the GNU Project.

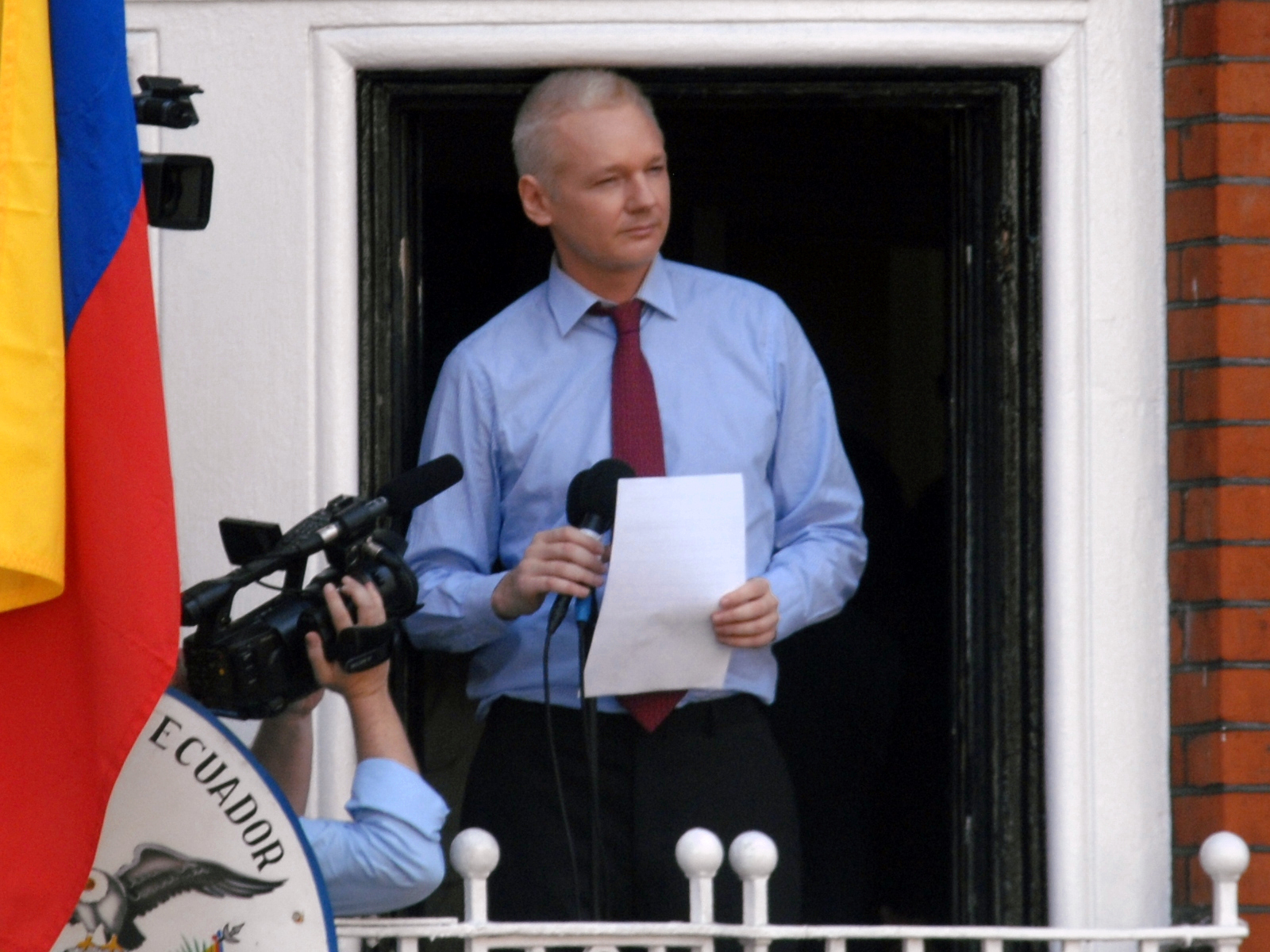
Julian Assange, a well-known cypherpunk who advocates for the use of cryptography to ensure privacy on the Internet

Cypherpunks list participants included many notable computer industry figures. Most were list regulars, although not all would call themselves "cypherpunks". The following is a list of noteworthy cypherpunks and their achievements:

- Marc Andreessen: co-founder of Netscape which invented SSL
- Jacob Appelbaum: Former Tor Project employee, political advocate
- Julian Assange: WikiLeaks founder, deniable cryptography inventor, journalist; co-author of Underground; author of Cypherpunks: Freedom and the Future of the Internet; member of the International Subversives. Assange has stated that he joined the list in late 1993 or early 1994. An archive of his cypherpunks mailing list posts is at the Mailing List Archives.
- Derek Atkins: computer scientist, computer security expert, and one of the people who factored RSA-129
- Adam Back: inventor of Hashcash and of NNTP-based Eternity networks; co-founder of Blockstream
- Jim Bell: author of "Assassination Politics"
- Steven Bellovin: Bell Labs researcher; later Columbia professor; Chief Technologist for the US Federal Trade Commission in 2012
- Matt Blaze: Bell Labs researcher; later professor at University of Pennsylvania; found flaws in the Clipper Chip
- Eric Blossom: designer of the Starium cryptographically secured mobile phone; founder of the GNU Radio project
- Jon Callas: technical lead on OpenPGP specification; co-founder and Chief Technical Officer of PGP Corporation; co-founder with Philip Zimmermann of Silent Circle
- Bram Cohen: creator of BitTorrent
- Matt Curtin: founder of Interhack Corporation; first faculty advisor of the Ohio State University Open Source Club; lecturer at Ohio State University
- Hugh Daniel (deceased): former Sun Microsystems employee; manager of the FreeS/WAN project (an early and important freeware IPsec implementation)
- Jack Dorsey: Founder of Twitter and Block.
- Suelette Dreyfus: deniable cryptography co-inventor, journalist, co-author of Underground
- Hal Finney (deceased): cryptographer; main author of PGP 2.0 and the core crypto libraries of later versions of PGP; designer of RPOW
- Eva Galperin: malware researcher and security advocate; Electronic Frontier Foundation activist
- John Gilmore*: Sun Microsystems' fifth employee; co-founder of the Cypherpunks and the Electronic Frontier Foundation; project leader for FreeS/WAN
- Mike Godwin: Electronic Frontier Foundation lawyer; electronic rights advocate
- Ian Goldberg*: professor at University of Waterloo; co-designer of the off-the-record messaging protocol
- Rop Gonggrijp: founder of XS4ALL; co-creator of the Cryptophone
- Matthew D. Green, influential in the development of the Zcash system
- Sean Hastings: founding CEO of Havenco; co-author of the book God Wants You Dead
- Johan Helsingius: creator and operator of Penet remailer
- Nadia Heninger: professor at University of California, San Diego; security researcher
- Robert Hettinga: founder of the International Conference on Financial Cryptography; originator of the idea of Financial cryptography as an applied subset of cryptography
- Mark Horowitz: author of the first PGP key server
- Tim Hudson: co-author of SSLeay, the precursor to OpenSSL
- Eric Hughes: founding member of Cypherpunks; author of A Cypherpunk's Manifesto
- Peter Junger (deceased): law professor at Case Western Reserve University
- Paul Kocher: president of Cryptography Research, Inc.; co-author of the SSL 3.0 protocol
- Ryan Lackey: co-founder of HavenCo, the world's first data haven
- Brian LaMacchia: designer of XKMS; research head at Microsoft Research
- Ben Laurie: founder of The Bunker, core OpenSSL team member, Google engineer.
- Morgan Marquis-Boire: researcher, security engineer, and privacy activist
- Matt Thomlinson (phantom): security engineer, leader of Microsoft's security efforts on Windows, Azure and Trustworthy Computing, CISO at Electronic Arts
- Timothy C. May (deceased): former Assistant Chief Scientist at Intel; author of A Crypto Anarchist Manifesto and the Cyphernomicon; a founding member of the Cypherpunks mailing list
- Jude Milhon (deceased; aka "St. Jude"): a founding member of the Cypherpunks mailing list, credited with naming the group; co-creator of Mondo 2000 magazine
- Satoshi Nakamoto: Pseudonym for the inventor(s) of Bitcoin.
- Sameer Parekh: former CEO of C2Net and co-founder of the CryptoRights Foundation human rights non-profit
- Vipul Ved Prakash: co-founder of Sense/Net; author of Vipul's Razor; founder of Cloudmark
- Runa Sandvik: Tor developer, political advocate
- Len Sassaman (deceased): maintainer of the Mixmaster Remailer software; researcher at Katholieke Universiteit Leuven; biopunk
- Steven Schear: creator of the warrant canary; street performer protocol; founding member of the International Financial Cryptographer's Association and GNURadio; team member at Counterpane; former Director at data security company Cylink and MojoNation
- Bruce Schneier*: well-known security author; founder of Counterpane
- Richard Stallman: founder of Free Software Foundation, privacy advocate
- Nick Szabo: inventor of smart contracts; designer of bit gold, a precursor to Bitcoin
- Wei Dai: Created b-money; cryptocurrency system and co-proposed the VMAC message authentication algorithm. The smallest subunit of Ether, the wei, is named after him.
- Zooko Wilcox-O'Hearn: DigiCash and MojoNation developer; founder of Zcash; co-designer of Tahoe-LAFS
- John Young: anti-secrecy activist and co-founder of Cryptome
- Philip Zimmermann: original creator of PGP v1.0 (1991); co-founder of PGP Inc. (1996); co-founder with Jon Callas of Silent Circle
- Edward Snowden: NSA whistleblower (2013); President of the Freedom of the Press Foundation

* indicates someone mentioned in the acknowledgements of Stephenson's Cryptonomicon.

== See also ==
- Anti-computer forensics
- Code as speech
- Comparison of cryptography libraries
- List of Hacker books
- List of cryptographers
- List of cryptography journals
- List of cryptography software
- List of open-source Cypherpunk software
