= Sean Hastings =

American businessman (born 1969)

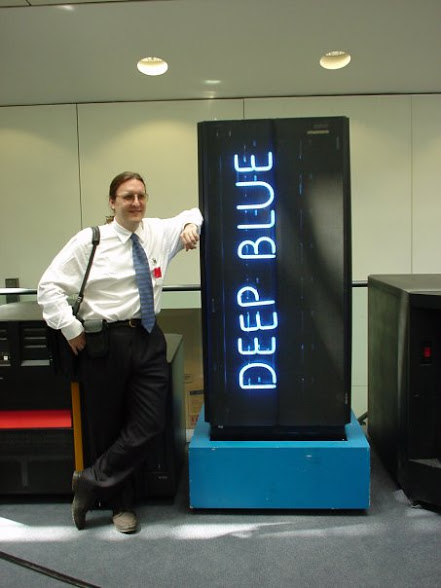
Sean Hastings

Sean Hastings (born 1969) is an American entrepreneur, cypherpunk author, and security expert.

== Work ==
In 1997, Hastings worked on cryptographic protocols and tools free of U.S. cryptographic export restrictions with Vincent Cate, who started the International Conference on Financial Cryptography in Anguilla that same year.

Hastings founded HavenCo in 2000, originally incorporating in his country of residence, Anguilla, before a second incorporation in the Channel Islands. Hastings was the CEO; other co-founders included Ryan Lackey and Sameer Parekh. Immediately following its public launch, HavenCo was the subject of a great deal of press coverage, including Hastings' appearance, along with several cofounders and the "royal family" of the self-proclaimed, unrecognized micronation of Sealand, on the cover of Wired's July 2000 issue, before the company was entirely nationalised by the government of Sealand in 2002, after commercial failure and mounting tensions.

In 2002, Hastings began work on seasteading with Patri Friedman, a project aimed at building floating communities free from the restrictions of current governments. This collaboration continued through 2009, including a talk by Hastings at the Seasteading Institute's annual conference.

Hastings is the cofounder, with Eric S. Raymond, of Green-Span, an open source infrastructure for trust and reputation management, begun in March 2009.

Hastings is also the author, with Paul Rosenberg, of a book, God Wants You Dead (Vera Verba, 2007; ISBN 978-0-9796011-1-8) which takes a look at the lighter side of atheism and anarchy, and was executive producer and an actor for The Last Generation to Die a short film about near future immortality technology.
