= Four Horsemen of the Infocalypse =

Analogy related to cybercrime

The Four Horsemen of the Infocalypse refers to those who use the Internet to facilitate crime or (pejoratively) to rhetorical approaches evoking such criminals.

The term was coined by Timothy C. May in 1988. May referred to "child pornographers, terrorists, drug dealers, etc.". May used the phrase to express disdain for what he perceived as "think of the children" argumentation by government officials and others seeking to justify limiting the civilian use of cryptography tools.

The phrase is a play on Four Horsemen of the Apocalypse. Digital rights activist Cory Doctorow frequently cites "software pirates, organized crime, child pornographers, and terrorists". Other sources use slightly different descriptions, but generally refer to similar activities.

One of the most famous definitions is in The Cyphernomicon by the cypherpunk writer and engineer Tim May, which states:

8.3.4. "How will privacy and anonymity be attacked?" [...]

- like so many other "computer hacker" items, as a tool for the "Four Horsemen": drug-dealers, money-launderers, terrorists, and pedophiles.

17.5.7. "What limits on the Net are being proposed?" [...]

- Newspapers are complaining about the Four Horsemen of the Infocalypse: terrorists, pedophiles, drug dealers, and money launderers

== See also ==
- Crypto Wars
- Fear, uncertainty and doubt
