= Crypto (book) =

Book by Steven Levy

Crypto: How the Code Rebels Beat the Government Saving Privacy in the Digital Age
- First US edition
- Author: Steven Levy
- Language: English
- Genre: Factual
- Publisher: Viking Press (US); Allen Lane (UK)
- Publication date: 2001
- ISBN: 0-14-024432-8
- OCLC: 48846639

Crypto: How the Code Rebels Beat the Government Saving Privacy in the Digital Age is a book about cryptography written by Steven Levy, published in 2001. Levy details the emergence of public key cryptography, digital signatures and the struggle between the National Security Agency and cypherpunks. The book details the creation of Data Encryption Standard (DES), RSA and the Clipper chip.

== Subjects ==
- Whitfield Diffie
- Martin Hellman
- David Kahn
- Ron Rivest
- Adi Shamir
- Leonard Adleman
- Phil Zimmermann
- Tom Jennings
- James Bamford
- Dorothy Denning
- Tim May
- Eric Hughes
- David Chaum
- John Gilmore
- Len Sassaman
- Adam Back
- Hal Finney
- Nick Szabo
- Paul Le Roux
- Wei Dai
- William F. Friedman

- Military Cryptanalytics

== See also ==
- Books on cryptography
- Crypto wars
