= Cristina Fallarás =

Spanish journalist

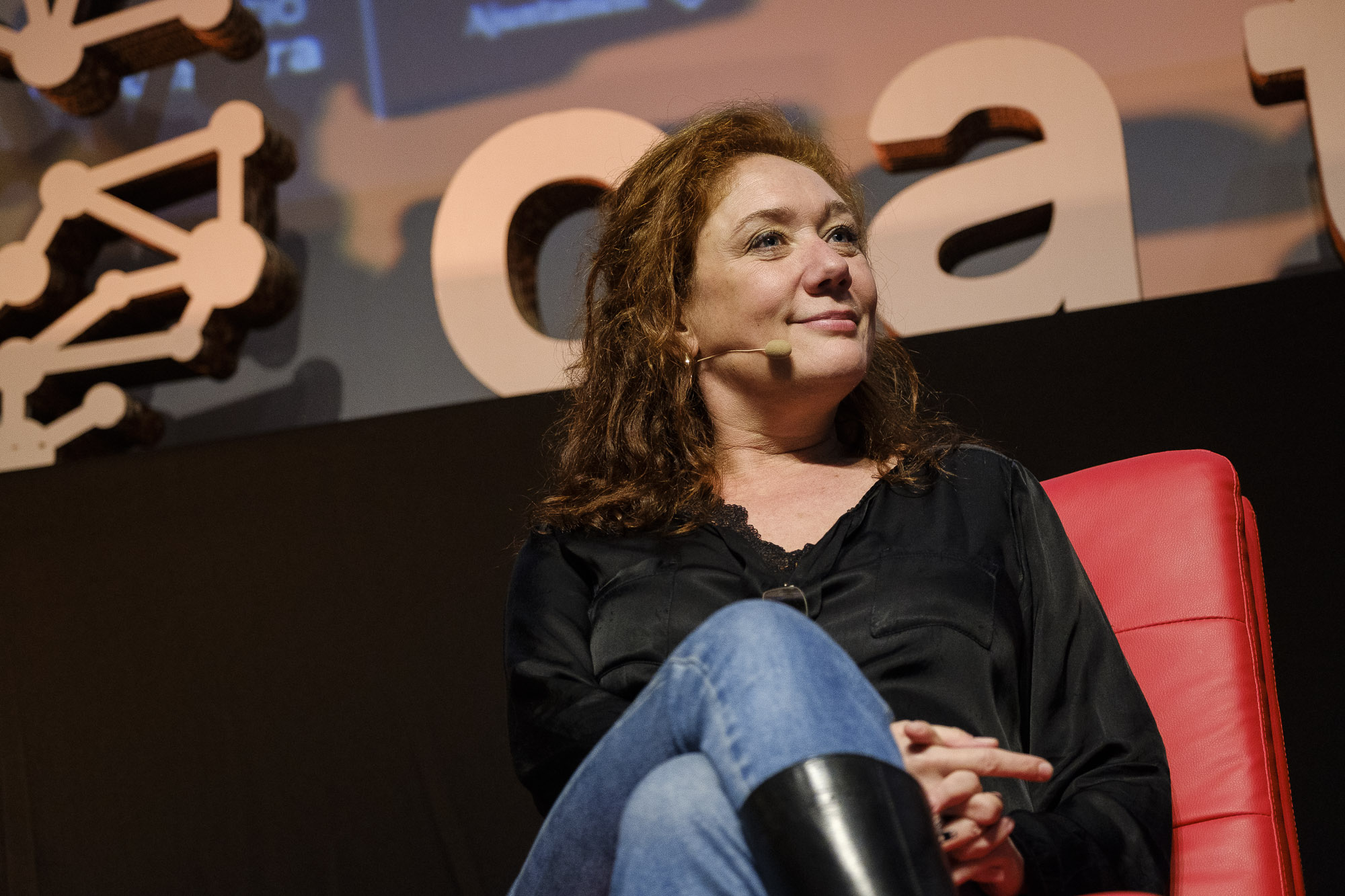

Cristina Fallarás Sánchez (Zaragoza, 18 March 1968) is a Spanish journalist.

She studied Information science at the Autonomous University of Barcelona and has worked as a journalist for Cadena Ser, El Mundo, El Periódico de Catalunya, RNE (Ràdio4) and the journal ADN.

In 2012, she was awarded the Premio Hammett, a prize awarded by the International Association of Crime Writers for the best crime novel written in Spanish, for her novel Las niñas perdidas (Lost Girls), published by Roca Editorial.

== Journalistic Career ==
She studied journalism at the Autonomous University of Barcelona (UAB). She was editor-in-chief of the Catalan edition of El Mundo and also worked in the newsrooms of Cadena Ser, Radio Nacional de España, El Periódico de Cataluña, Antena 3 and Telecinco.

She participated in the design of the editorial project of the newspaper ADN, which belongs to Grupo Planeta, which she co-founded and where she worked as assistant director until 2008. From 27 November 2006 to 19 February 2012 she published a blog in which she shared her thoughts and experiences.

From September 2016 to February 2017, she was the director of the digital version of Diario 16. She announced her resignation on her Twitter account, claiming that working conditions at the company were unacceptable.

In July 2018, she was proposed as, but did not become, a board member for RTVE, at the request of the Podemos party. In recent years, she has worked as an analyst on various television programmes.

=== Novelist ===
In 2011, she published the novel Las niñas perdidas (The lost girls) which earned her two awards and made her the first woman to win the Hammett Prize, given by the Semana Negra of Gijón. In 2011 she was also awarded the Award for a Novella from Barbastro for her novella Últimos días en el Puesto del Este.

== Bibliography ==
- La otra Enciclopedia Catalana, Belacqua, 2002
- Rupturas, Urano, 2003
- No acaba la noche, Planeta, 2006
- Así murió el poeta Guadalupe, Alianza, 2009
- Las niñas perdidas, Roca Editorial, 2011
- Últimos días en el Puesto del Este, DVD ediciones, 2011
- A la puta calle: Crónica de un desahucio, Bronce Editorial, 2013
- Honrarás a tu padre y a tu madre, Anagrama, 2018
- Ahora contamos nosotras, Anagrama, 2019
- Posibilidad de un nido, Esto No Es Berlín, 2020
- El evangelio según María Magdalena, Penguin Random House, 2021
