= SIGAINT =

- Website type: Webmail, E-Mail service
- Available in: English
- Website: sigaint.org, sigaintevyh2rzvw.onion (defunct)
- Commercial: No
- Registration: Required
- Users: about 370,000
- Current status: Offline

SIGAINT was a Tor hidden service offering secure email services. According to its FAQ page, its web interface used SquirrelMail which does not rely on JavaScript. Passwords couldn't be recovered. Users received two addresses per inbox: one at sigaint.org for receiving clearnet emails and the other at its .onion address only for receiving emails sent from other Tor-enabled email services. Free accounts had 50 MB of storage space and expired after one year of inactivity. Upgraded accounts had access to POP3, IMAP, SMTP, larger size limits, full disk encryption, and never expired.

== Security ==
In April 2015, a number of user accounts were compromised in what was speculated at the time to be a government-sponsored de-anonymization attack from 70 different exit nodes. A SIGAINT administrator said that the hidden service was not hacked but malicious exit nodes had modified their clearnet page so that its link to the hidden service pointed to an imposter hidden service, effectively tricking users with a phishing attack that harvested login credentials. Following this incident, SIGAINT had added SSL to their gateway to protect against similar attacks in the future.

== Reception ==
The service was recommended by various security specialists as a highly secure email service.

The service is currently down. Both its ".org" website and its onion link return error code 500.

== See also ==
- Freedom Hosting
- Comparison of webmail providers
