= Heather Marsh =

Canadian journalist

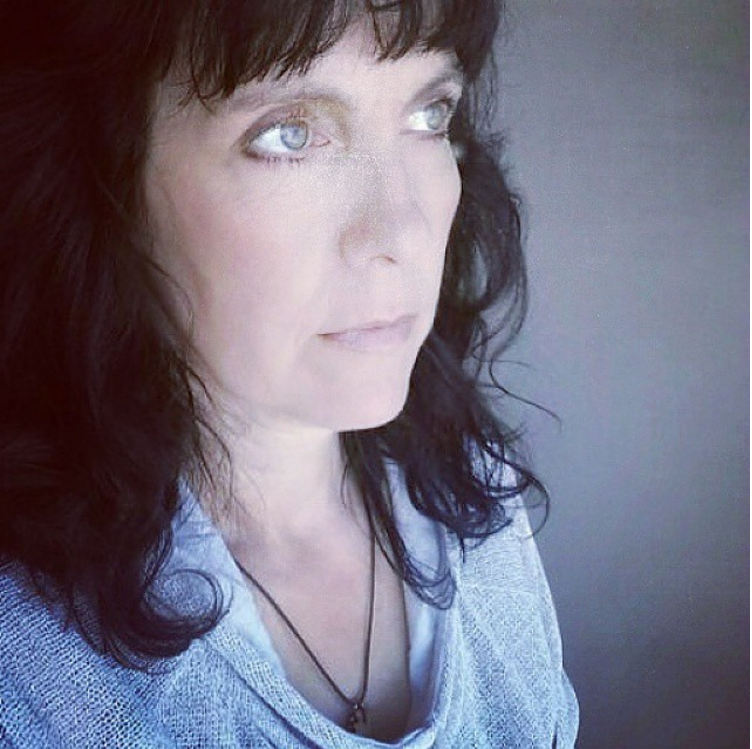
- Heather Marsh, Cuba, 2016
- Occupations: Author, programmer
- Known for: Horizontal governance theory
- Notable work: Binding Chaos series
- Website: georgiebc.wordpress.com

Heather Marsh is a philosopher, programmer and human rights activist. She is the author of the Binding Chaos series, a study of methods of mass collaboration.

== Internet and journalism ==
In 2015 Marsh began working on a data project, Getgee, with the goal of allowing global collaboration on research and information without control by a specific platform. This is a continuation of her earlier project called the Global Square.

== Activism ==
Marsh has been a transparency activist associated with Guantanamo activism, primarily for Canadian POW Omar Khadr, and Anonymous activity, particularly human rights issues. She has reported on and campaigned against human trafficking and violations committed by global resource corporations.

She has written investigative reports and interviews on Canadian juvenile Omar Khadr, one of the youngest prisoners of Guantanamo Bay. She was the national spokesperson for the Free Omar Khadr group in Canada.

She has reported on ritual killings in Gabon and began a research project to map connections between the people responding to a fracking protest in New Brunswick. She started the OpDeathEaters campaign with a goal of independent inquiries to investigate and a change in public discourse around human trafficking. The opGabon and opDeatheaters campaigns were the subject of a book, Crime, Justice and Social Media by Australian criminologist Michael Salter which featured extensive interviews with her.

== See also ==
- CryptoParty
