= Title V =

Title 5 may refer to:

- Title 5 of the United States Code
- Title 5 of the Code of Federal Regulations
- Title V of the Patriot Act
