= Anil Madhavapeddy =

Irish computer scientist

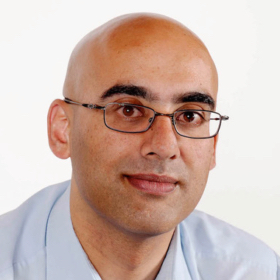
- Anil Madhavapeddy
- Citizenship: Irish
- Education: Imperial College London (BSc); University of Cambridge (PhD)
- Scientific career
- Fields: Operating Systems; Cloud Computing; Functional Programming
- Workplaces: University of Cambridge; Docker
- Thesis: Creating high-performance, statically type-safe network applications (2006)
- Doctoral advisor: Andy Hopper and David Greaves
- Website: https://www.cst.cam.ac.uk/people/avsm2

Anil Madhavapeddy is the Professor of Planetary Computing at the Department of Computer Science and Technology in the University of Cambridge, a Fellow of Pembroke College, Cambridge, and a J M Keynes Fellow. He is the Founding Director of the Cambridge Centre for Carbon Credits, aiming to distribute funds raised through the sale of carbon credits in a verifiable manner.

== Education ==
Madhavapeddy graduated from Imperial College London in 1999, and obtained his PhD in Computer Science from the University of Cambridge in 2006 for research on programming languages and operating systems supervised by Andy Hopper and David Greaves.

== Research and Teaching ==
Madhavapeddy is the author of Real World OCaml, the second edition of which was published in Oct 2022 by Cambridge University Press, with an earlier edition in 2013 by O'Reilly Media. RWO has been used as a text in computer science courses such as Princeton’s COS326, Cornell’s CS6110 and UPenn’s CIS 120. At Cambridge, Anil teaches the Foundations of Computer Science course in the Computer Science Tripos which introduces functional programming. Past lecturers of this course include Lawrence Paulson, Alan Mycroft and Amanda Prorok.

Madhavapeddy primarily researches programming languages and operating systems. He is one of the main creators of unikernel library operating systems, and has researched parallelism and effect systems for functional languages such as OCaml.

Madhavapeddy's latest project is a collaboration with Srinivasan Keshav and Andrew Balmford on verifiable carbon credits for nature-based solutions, which has been seen as an alternative to cryptocurrency tokens

== Industry ==
Madhavapeddy has made substantial contributions to open source software such as MirageOS, OCaml, Docker, Xen and OpenBSD. He is currently a Council Member at the Tezos Foundation and the advisory board of OpenUK. He co-founded Unikernel Systems in 2015, which was acquired by Docker in 2016 where he served as a Docker maintainer, introducing technologies such as HyperKit, VPNKit and DataKit that made Docker for Desktop possible.

Madhavapeddy has been a senior maintainer of OCaml since 2011, where he helped develop the OCaml Package Manager, the tooling ecosystem, as well as support for multicore parallelism and effect handlers in OCaml 5.0. He has published over 150 software libraries for OCaml.

He co-founded High Energy Magic Ltd in 2003 with Eben Upton and others, which was an early implementation of interactive barcodes in camera-phones and later commercialised as ShotCodes.

Madhavapeddy also served on the core team at the Horde project from 1999 until 2008, where he helped develop the IMP webmail client and the Chora CVS viewer.

He worked on the Mars Polar Lander ground data systems in 1998 and subsequently at NetApp to deploy early content delivery networks using NetCache

He was one of the signatories of Statement on AI Risk (2023) open letter.
