= Eric Hughes (cypherpunk) =

American mathematician, programmer, and cypherpunk founder

Eric Hughes is an American mathematician, computer programmer, and cypherpunk. He is considered one of the founders of the cypherpunk movement, alongside Timothy C. May and John Gilmore.

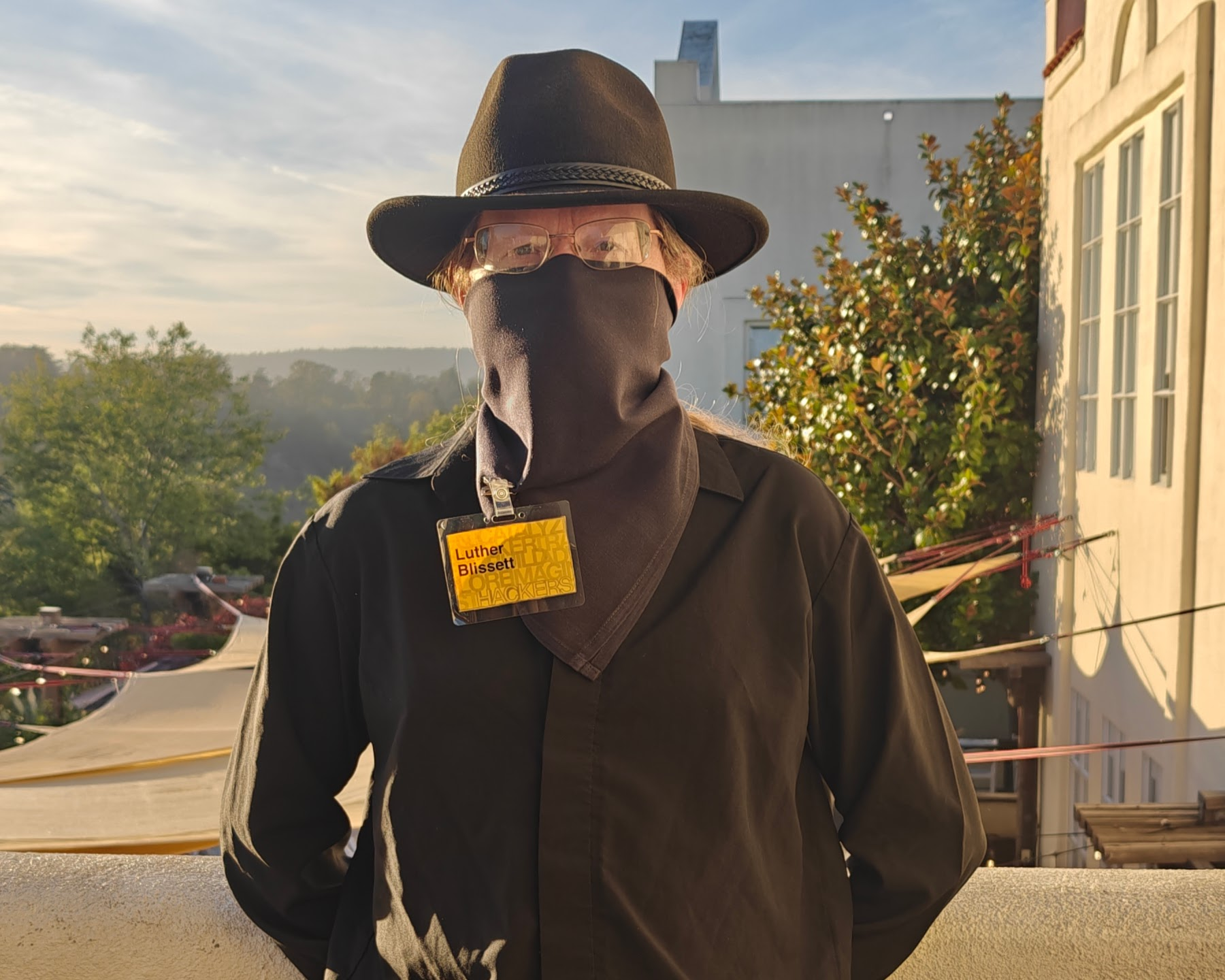
Hughes wearing a black bandana and a name tag with the Luther Blissett pseudonym

He is notable for founding and administering the Cypherpunk mailing list, authoring A Cypherpunk's Manifesto, creating and hosting the first anonymous remailer, and coining the motto, "Cypherpunks write code".

The May/June 1993 issue (vol. 1 no. 2) of Wired featured a cover photo, credited to Larry Dyer, of three masked cypherpunks, of which Hughes was one.

Hughes argued that a wider acceptance of cryptography and privacy in society is necessary for success. He used an example of a Clipper chip as confirmation, where a wide opposition to the chip in society resulted in its rollout halted.

On September 27, 2012, Hughes delivered the keynote address, Putting the Personal Back in Personal Computers, at the Amsterdam CryptoParty.

== See also ==
- Cypherpunk
