= Vince Cate =

Cryptography software developer

Vincent Aron Cate (born 1963) is a cryptography software developer based in Anguilla. He gave up his U.S. citizenship in 1998 in protest of U.S. laws on the export of cryptography.

== Early life and education ==
Cate graduated from the University of California, Berkeley and later enrolled as a doctoral student at Carnegie Mellon University, where he did research on file systems with Thomas Gross, and also worked on allowing remote file systems to be mounted over FTP. However, with the rise of the Internet, Cate lost interest in his research and left the university without completing his dissertation, receiving a master's degree.

== Career ==
In the early 1980s, Cate lived in San Jose, California, where he ran a business producing software and hardware to interface CP/M-compatible printers, disk drives, and keyboards with Atari computers such as the Atari 400. This allowed CP/M system owners considering the purchase of an Atari computer to save on the cost of peripherals for their new computer.

In 1994, Cate moved to the British Overseas Territory of Anguilla to pursue business opportunities.

At first, Cate attempted to start an electronic money business. However, in those early years, local banks were wary of Cate's business model, which involved accepting credit cards over the Internet, and so instead he started an internet service provider, offering dial-up Internet access to island residents. Eventually, Cate's company, Offshore Information Services, expanded from the ISP business to offer company formation services, aimed at helping clients operate e-commerce businesses in Anguilla. OIS' servers ran software from C2Net, one of the early supporters of Transport Layer Security, in order to allow clients to offer secure online transactions to their customers. OIS also sold cryptographic software aimed at end-users in the finance sector. One motivation of Cate's work was to provide a haven from increasing internet censorship in China, in France, Germany, and the United States; he mentioned the U.S.' Communications Decency Act of 1996 as an issue of major concern to him. His work prompted comparisons to the Bruce Sterling novel Islands in the Net.

== Other activities ==
Outside of his work in Anguilla, Cate also started a computer club which helped schools in Anguilla acquire donations of old computers for the use of their students; he described it as his "best source of talent searching", and by 1998 had hired three members of the computer club for his own business.

In 1997, Cate collaborated with cypherpunk Robert Hettinga and Massachusetts Institute of Technology researcher Rafael Hirschfield to organise the International Conference on Financial Cryptography. Presenters at the first conference included Ron Rivest.

From the 1990s to 2025, Cate was also involved with the administration of .ai, Anguilla's country code top-level domain.

== Political views ==
Cate engaged in civil disobedience against U.S. cryptography policy by setting up a webpage inviting readers to "become an international arms trafficker in one click". The page contained an HTML form which, when submitted, would e-mail three lines of Perl code implementing the RSA public-key encryption algorithm to a server in Anguilla; this could have qualified as unlicensed export of munitions under U.S. law at the time. Visitors could opt to have their names and e-mail addresses displayed publicly in a list on that page. By 1997, the list contained the names or aliases of more than one thousand visitors; that number grew to nearly seven thousand by September 1998.

In September 1998 Cate took his protests a step further, paying $5,000 to naturalise as a citizen of Mozambique and then giving up his U.S. citizenship. (He would have had to wait for more than a decade longer to qualify for naturalisation as a British Overseas Territories citizen with Anguilla Belonger status.) In April 1999, a notice confirming his loss of U.S. citizenship was published in the Federal Register as required by the Health Insurance Portability and Accountability Act.

== Publications ==
- Cate, Vincent; Gross, Thomas (1991). "Combining the concepts of compression and caching for a two-level filesystem". Operating Systems Review. 25: 200–211. doi:10.1145/106974.106993.
