= Ryan Lackey =

American businessman (born 1979)

- Born: Ryan Donald Lackey; March 17, 1979 (age 47); West Chester, Pennsylvania
- Website: http://www.venona.com/rdl/

Ryan Donald Lackey (born March 17, 1979) is an entrepreneur and computer security professional. He was a co-founder of HavenCo, the world's first data haven, and operated BlueIraq, a communications company. He speaks at numerous conferences and trade shows, including DEF CON and the RSA Data Security Conference, on various topics in the computer security field, and has appeared in a Wired magazine cover story and in numerous television, radio, and print articles, concerning HavenCo and Sealand.

== Early life ==
Lackey was born in West Chester, Pennsylvania and has lived throughout the US and Europe, and in Anguilla, Sealand, Dubai, and Iraq. As a teenager, he was briefly involved with the Globewide Network Academy. Lackey attended MIT and majored in Course 18 (mathematics), eventually dropping out due to financial constraints. While there, Lackey became interested in electronic cash and distributed systems, originally for massively multiplayer online gaming. This interest led to attending several conferences (Financial Cryptography 98, various MIT presentations), participating on mailing lists such as "cypherpunks" and "dbs", and, with Ian Goldberg, eventually implementing patented Chaumian digital cash in an underground library, HINDE, which was named after Hinde ten Berge, a Dutch cypherpunk also present at FC98. He contributed to the cypherpunks movement as one of the longest anonymous remailer operators.

== Career ==
In 1999 Lackey lived in the San Francisco Bay Area before moving to the self-proclaimed state of Sealand and establishing HavenCo. In December 2002, he left HavenCo, following a dispute with other company directors and the Sealand "Royal Family".

During the US conflicts in Iraq and Afghanistan, Lackey operated BlueIraq, a VSAT communications and IT company serving the DoD and domestic markets in those countries. BlueIraq's business model eventually became economically unfeasible due to an escalation in anti-Western violence (primarily in the form of improvised explosive devices) and troop drawdowns. BlueIraq sought venture capital to transform itself into a large general consumer cellular telephone company, but the 2008 financial crisis and the instability of Iraq and Afghanistan made fundraising impossible.

Lackey returned to the US and located in San Francisco, where he worked for a number of start-up companies before applying to Y Combinator. He was accepted into Y Combinator's Summer 2011 round. Lackey founded CryptoSeal, a VPN as a service start-up with a small group of people well known in the computer security community, and secured funding from Ron Conway and a well known venture capital fund. In June 2014, CryptoSeal was acquired by Cloudflare.

In 2017, he began working as Chief Security Officer for the Tezos Foundation in support of the Tezos blockchain. According to his LinkedIn profile, Lackey left that position in November of 2020, and as of 2021 is employed at a crypto-related insurance company in Puerto Rico.

== See also ==
- ecash
- Satellite Internet access
- Information security
- Iraq War
