= Lawrence Paulson =

American computer scientist

Lawrence Paulson FRS
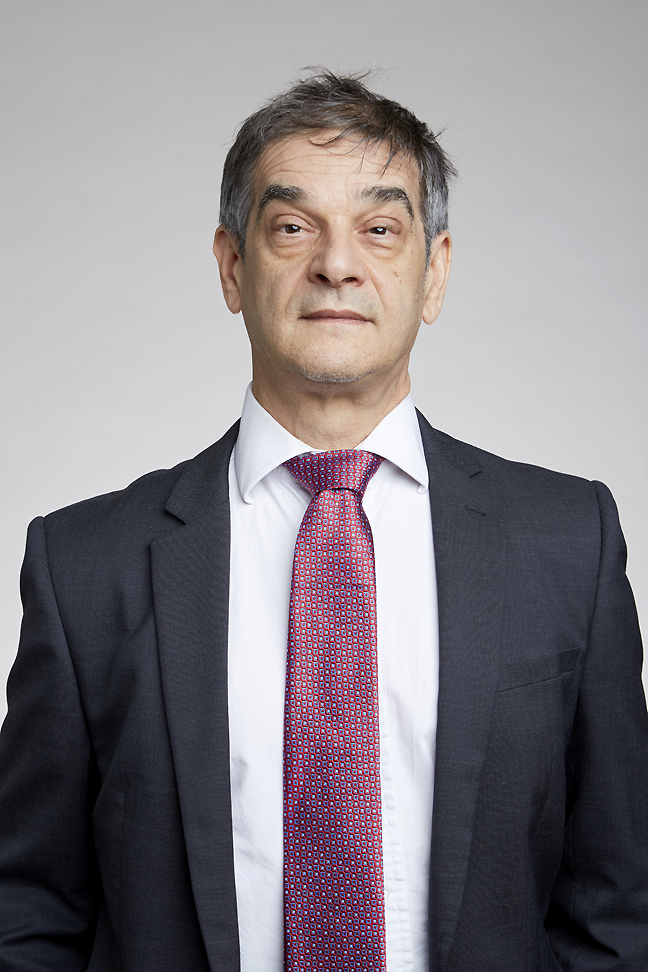
- Paulson in 2017
- Born: Lawrence Charles Paulson; 1955 (age 70–71)
- Citizenship: US/UK
- Education: California Institute of Technology; Stanford University
- Known for: ML; Isabelle; MetiTarski
- Spouses: Susan Mary Paulson (d. 2010); Elena Tchougounova
- Awards: ACM Fellow (2008)
- Scientific career
- Fields: Theorem proving; Formal methods; Computer security
- Workplaces: University of Cambridge; Technical University of Munich
- Thesis: A Compiler Generator for Semantic Grammars (1981)
- Doctoral advisor: John L. Hennessy
- Website: Official website

Lawrence Charles Paulson is an American computer scientist. He is a professor of computational logic at the University of Cambridge Computer Laboratory and a fellow of Clare College, Cambridge.

== Education ==
Paulson graduated from the California Institute of Technology in 1977, and obtained his PhD in computer science from Stanford University in 1981 for research on programming languages and compiler-compilers supervised by John L. Hennessy.

== Research ==
Paulson came to the University of Cambridge in 1983 and became a Fellow of Clare College, Cambridge in 1987. He is best known for the cornerstone text on the programming language ML, ML for the Working Programmer. His research is based around the interactive theorem prover Isabelle, which he introduced in 1986. He has worked on the verification of cryptographic protocols using inductive definitions, and he has also formalised the constructible universe of Kurt Gödel. Recently he has built a new theorem prover, MetiTarski, for real-valued special functions.

Paulson taught an undergraduate lecture course in the Computer Science Tripos, entitled Logic and Proof which covers automated theorem proving and related methods. He also used to teach Foundations of Computer Science which introduces functional programming, but this course was taken over by Alan Mycroft and Amanda Prorok in 2017, and then Anil Madhavapeddy and Amanda Prorok in 2019.

== Awards and honours ==
Paulson was elected a Fellow of the Royal Society (FRS) in 2017, a Fellow of the Association for Computing Machinery in 2008 and a Distinguished Affiliated Professor for Logic in Informatics at the Technical University of Munich.

== Personal life ==
Paulson has two children by his first wife, Dr Susan Mary Paulson, who died in 2010. Since 2012, he has been married to Dr Elena Tchougounova.
