= CryptoRights Foundation =

American foundation

The CryptoRights Foundation, Inc. (CRF) is a 501(c)(3) non-profit organization based in San Francisco. The CryptoRights Foundation helps human rights groups and other NGOs use encryption to protect their online communications. It has contributed to encryption standards such as OpenPGP, IPsec and GnuPG. The organization was founded on 26 February 1998 during a total solar eclipse (near maximum totality of the active volcanic Caribbean island of Montserrat) on a boat chartered by attendees of the International Financial Cryptography Association conference on Anguilla by Dave Del Torto and a group of fellow "cypherpunk" cryptology experts.

Significant technology projects include the development of HighFire ("Human rights Firewall"), a distributed communications platform for private NGO communications (on a miniaturized PC called the FireBox, about the size of a cable modem), and the related HighWire, a wireless human rights communications networking project that became the open source Software Defined Radio source code now maintained at GnuRadio. CRF provides free security training and support for human rights and journalism organizations on the use of cryptography. A CRF team also developed the GPG plug-in for SquirrelMail.

== See also ==
- Electronic Frontier Foundation
- Electronic Privacy Information Center
