= Robert Hettinga =

- Occupation: Writer
- Known for: Financial cryptography

Robert Hettinga is a technical and political writer with a focus on financial cryptography. Hettinga was well known for his postings on the Cypherpunk and e$ and e$pam mailing list and founded the Internet Bearer Underwriting Corporation (IBUC).

Hettinga was also one of the founders of the world's first conference on financial cryptography, FC97, on the island of Anguilla.
