= Van Halen test =

Test of following instructions

A Van Halen test refers to any question that is asked to assess whether the full set of instructions given to another party has been thoroughly and correctly read. It has also been used to describe asking necessary questions.

The name of the test refers to the contractual clause Van Halen would give to venues at which they were to perform. There was a clause requesting that a bowl of M&Ms be supplied, with all the brown candies removed. If this bowl with the correct contents was not provided by the venue, they knew their contract was not thoroughly reviewed, and that there might be safety issues. The worry was that with complex safety requirements involving pyrotechnics, large voltages, and stage construction, any lapse in following instructions could be a danger. Rumors about this clause date back to 1980.

== See also ==
- Warrant canary
