= Horde (software) =

Open-source groupware

Horde Application Framework

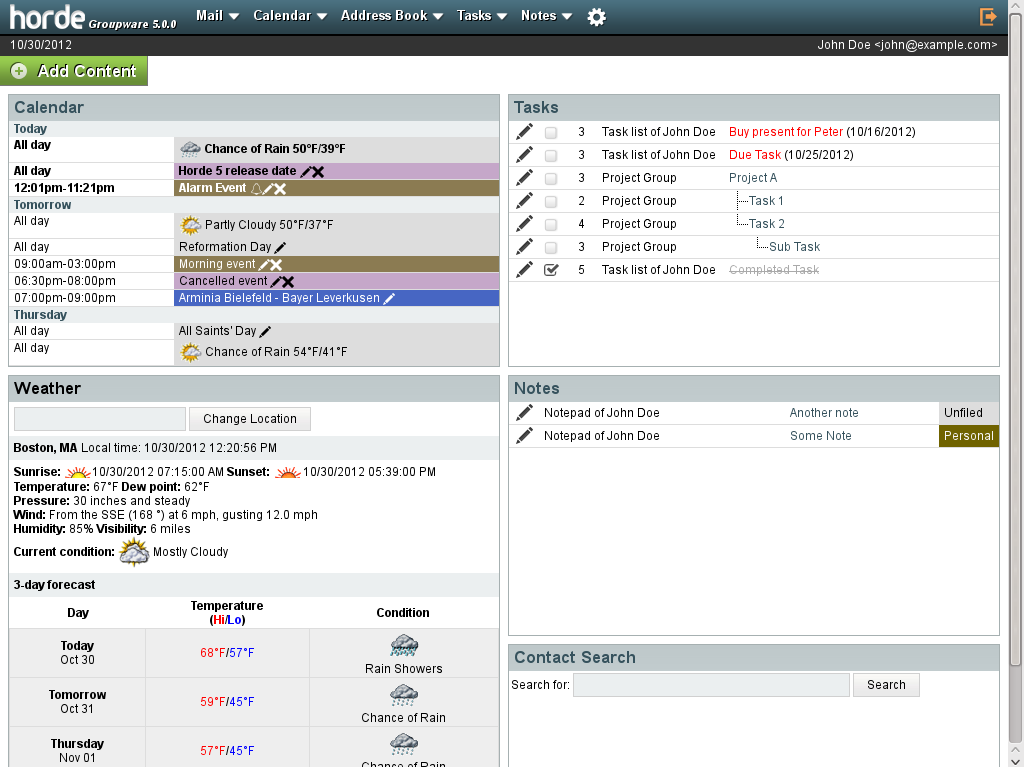
- Portal screen of Horde Groupware (5.0)
- Original authors: Charles Hagenbuch, Jan Schneider, Michael J Rubinsky , Ralf Lang, Michael Slusarz, Ben Klang, Gunnar Wrobel, Matt Selsky, Jon Parise, Eric Rostetter, Marcus I. Ryan, Anil Madhavapeddy, Rich Lafferty
- Developer: The Horde Core Team
- Stable release: 6.2.1 / 22 July 2026; 3 months ago
- Written in: PHP
- Operating system: Cross-platform
- Available in: English and many others (multilingual)
- Type: Web application framework
- License: GNU Lesser General Public License
- Website: www.horde.org
- Repository: github.com/horde/base

Horde is a free web-based groupware. The components of this groupware rest on the Horde framework, a PHP-based framework provides all the elements required for rapid web application development. Horde offers applications such as the Horde IMP email client, a groupware package (calendar, notes, tasks, file manager), a wiki and a time and task tracking software.

== History ==
The Horde framework evolved from the IMP (Internet Messaging Project) webmail that Chuck Hagenbuch published on Freshmeat in 1998. A constant stream of feature requests not all fitting for a webmail application led to the development of a more generic web application backbone: the Horde framework. The first announcement on Freshmeat was version 1.3.3 at the beginning of 2001. The release of Horde 2.0 and IMP 3.0 was the first one with two truly separate components. In late 2001, the Chora CVS frontend was adopted by PHP as their repository viewer and released as another standalone component in 2002. The Nag task manager, Nnemo note taker, the Turba contacts manager and Kronolith calendar were also all first released throughout 2002.

The early releases of IMP saw adoption across the world as the primary webmail interface for users, with some deployments exceeding hundreds of thousands of users. Horde as a generic web application framework primarily supported the webmail as well as a set of groupware applications by the time Horde 3.0 was released in 2004. The modular and flexible nature of the software allowed many service providers and packagers to integrate the software into their portfolio. Horde is the software used for webmail offered by SAPO which serves several million users. The software has been packaged for all major Linux distributions and is available as a component in hosting tools such as Plesk or cPanel.

With the release of Horde 4.0 in 2011 the framework saw significant architectural changes, a split into nearly a hundred separate PEAR packages and support for smartphones.

While preparing the last Horde 3 maintenance release in February 2012 the Horde developers discovered that hackers breached the security of the Horde FTP server and managed to place a backdoor into three of the distributed packages. The attack had taken place in November of the year before so that the modified packages were distributed over three months. One of the tainted packages was picked up by the unstable branches of Debian and Ubuntu and were fixed immediately after the successful attack was disclosed. The attackers did not modify the newer Horde 4 sources.

Horde 5 was released in 2012, and its last maintenance release (version 5.2.23) in 2020. The latest supported PHP version of this branch is 7.4, which reached end of life in 2022. This means that Horde 5 cannot be run on a modern, supported version of PHP anymore which forces its users to migrate to other webmail/groupware software alternatives. The Horde 6 branch offers PHP 8.1+ compatibility.

Horde was removed from CPanel in 2022 and is planned to be removed from Plesk in 2025.

== Applications ==
The Horde framework contains the following applications and application groups.

=== Horde Email Platform ===
- IMP - a web-based email client.
  - MIMP - a stripped-down version of IMP for use on devices with a small screen or limited HTML support.
- Ingo - an email filter rules manager.
- Sork - a collection of four other Horde modules (accounts, forwards, passwd, and vacation) which together perform various account management functions.

=== Horde Groupware ===
- Kronolith - a calendar application.
- Mnemo - a note manager.
- Nag - a multiuser task list manager.
- Turba - a Horde address book / contact manager.

==== Horde Groupware Webmail Edition ====
Horde Groupware Webmail Edition extends the Horde Groupware by the Horde e-mail applications IMP and Ingo.

=== Horde developer tools ===
- Chora – a version control repository viewer supporting CVS and Subversion.
- Whups – the Web Horde User Problem Solver, a ticket-tracking system

== Integration into other products ==
Horde was the web client for the Kolab groupware system up until version 3. It is also integrated into the Plesk Server management software, and was integrated into cPanel & WHM until version 108.

== See also ==
- List of collaborative software § Open source software compares its features with others
