= Marta Peirano =

Spanish journalist and writer (born 1975)

- Born: 1975 (age 50–51); Madrid, Spain
- Occupations: Journalist; writer
- Notable work: El pequeño libro rojo del activista en la red (2015); El enemigo conoce el sistema (2019); Contra el futuro (2022)

Marta Peirano (born 1975) is a Spanish journalist and writer who specialises in the relationship between technology and power. She was a founder of the newspaper ADN, the magazine Campobase and the projects Copyfight, CryptoParty Berlin and Hack Hackers Berlin; head of Culture and Technology at the digital newspaper elDiario.es, where she was later deputy to the director; and is a columnist for El País and Radio Nacional de España.

== Career ==
Peirano was born in Madrid in 1975 and started out in the technology section of the newspaper El Mundo, as the internet first arrived in Spain; she has said that she wanted to be a journalist since she was a child. Over the following years she wrote about art, software, technology and culture for Spanish magazines and daily newspapers, edited the blog La Petite Claudine and lived in Zagreb, Copenhagen, Brussels, Barcelona, Ljubljana, Atlanta and Berlin.

She was a founder of the free daily newspaper ADN, the magazine Campobase and the projects Copyfight, Cryptoparty Berlin and Hack Hackers Berlin, and in 2015 returned to Spain to work at the digital newspaper elDiario.es, where she was head of the Culture and Technology section and, in her last two years at the paper, deputy to the director. With Elástico, a multidisciplinary collective she co-founded, she co-directed COPYFIGHT, a 2005 project on free culture; she also founded the culture sections of ADN.es and elDiario.es. She has also contributed to the cultural magazine Jot Down.

In September 2015 she gave the TEDxMadrid talk "¿Por qué me vigilan, si no soy nadie?" ("Why am I being watched, if I am nobody?"), on the importance of protecting personal data. By 2023 the talk had been viewed more than four million times on YouTube.

Peirano is a columnist for El País and Radio Nacional de España, where she hosts a weekly technopolitics section on Las mañanas de RNE; she has also collaborated with laSexta and the science magazine Muy Interesante. She has been a member of the advisory board of the Biennal del Pensamiento de Barcelona and of the cyberdefence working group of the Centro Superior de Estudios de la Defensa Nacional (CESEDEN), and conducts the festival (re)programming – Strategies for Self-Renewal at Aksioma, the Institute of Contemporary Art in Ljubljana; she lives between Madrid and Berlin.

== Books ==
Peirano's books range from an anthology on the history of automata to essays on cryptography, surveillance capitalism and the climate crisis.

=== El rival de Prometeo ===
Her first book, El rival de Prometeo. Vidas de autómatas ilustres, edited with Sonia Bueno, was published by Impedimenta in 2009. An anthology of literary and speculative texts, it moves from the "living anatomies" of Jacques de Vaucanson and the chess-playing Turk to E. T. A. Hoffmann, Edgar Allan Poe, Sigmund Freud and the apocalyptic predictions of Isaac Asimov and Vernor Vinge.

=== El pequeño libro rojo del activista en la red ===
In 2015 she published El pequeño libro rojo del activista en la red (Roca Editorial), an introduction to cryptography for journalists, sources and media outlets that was the first book in the world to carry a prologue by Edward Snowden.

=== El enemigo conoce el sistema ===
Her 2019 essay El enemigo conoce el sistema, published by Debate, examines the current state of the internet: a space born for horizontal distribution between equals that has become a tool of surveillance, control and mass manipulation through the data-extraction industry. Jorge Carrión selected it as one of the best books of 2019 in the Spanish edition of The New York Times.

=== Contra el futuro ===
In early summer 2022 she published Contra el futuro. Resistencia ciudadana frente al feudalismo climático (Debate), which proposes citizen-action strategies against what she calls "climate feudalism": the privatisation, into the hands of the same few large technology companies, of the infrastructures needed to confront the climate crisis. The 176-page book calls for the creation of a "civil army" against the climate crisis, based on cooperation between the scientific community and civil society. Reviewing the book in Confabulario, the cultural supplement of the Mexican newspaper El Universal, Alejandro Badillo praised its capacity to communicate complex concepts clearly and to think outside the dominant paradigms.

== Works ==
- El rival de Prometeo. Vidas de autómatas ilustres (edited with Sonia Bueno). Impedimenta, 2009.
- El pequeño libro rojo del activista en la red. Roca Editorial, 2015.
- El enemigo conoce el sistema. Debate, 2019.
- Contra el futuro. Resistencia ciudadana frente al feudalismo climático. Debate, 2022.
