= CryptoParty =

Grassroots-sponsored public workshops to introduce basics of practical cryptography

CryptoParty (Crypto-Party) is a grassroots global endeavour to introduce the basics of practical cryptography such as the Tor anonymity network, I2P, Freenet, key signing parties, disk encryption and virtual private networks to the general public. The project primarily consists of a series of free public workshops.

== History ==
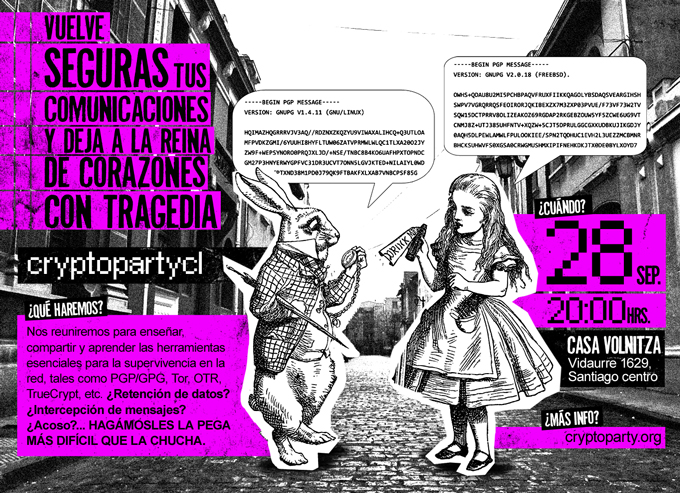
A flyer for a CryptoParty in Santiago, Chile featuring Alice in Wonderland imagery.

As a successor to the Cypherpunks of the 1990s, CryptoParty was conceived in late August 2012 by the Australian journalist Asher Wolf in a Twitter post following the passing of the Cybercrime Legislation Amendment Bill 2011 and the proposal of a two-year data retention law in that country, the Cybercrime Legislation Amendment Bill 2011. The DIY, self-organizing movement immediately went viral, with a dozen autonomous CryptoParties being organized within hours in cities throughout Australia, the US, the UK, and Germany. The Berlin chapter was co-founded by Spanish journalist Marta Peirano. Many more parties were soon organized or held in Chile, the Netherlands, Hawaii, Asia, etc. Tor usage in Australia itself spiked, and CryptoParty London with 130 attendees—some of whom were veterans of the Occupy London movement—had to be moved from London Hackspace to the Google campus in east London's Tech City.

As of mid-October 2012 some 30 CryptoParties have been held globally, some on a continuing basis, and CryptoParties were held on the same day in Reykjavik, Brussels, and Manila.

The first draft of the 442-page CryptoParty Handbook (the hard copy of which is available at cost) was pulled together in three days using the book sprint approach, and was released 2012-10-04 under a CC BY-SA license.

=== Edward Snowden involvement ===
In May 2014, Wired reported that Edward Snowden, while employed by Dell as an NSA contractor, organized a local CryptoParty at a small hackerspace in Honolulu, Hawaii on December 11, six months before becoming well known for leaking tens of thousands of secret U.S. government documents. During the CryptoParty, Snowden taught 20 Hawaii residents how to encrypt their hard drives and use the Internet anonymously. The event was filmed by Snowden's then-girlfriend, but the video has never been released online. In a follow-up post to the CryptoParty wiki, Snowden pronounced the event a "huge success."

== Media response ==
In 2013, CryptoParty received messages of support from the Electronic Frontier Foundation and (purportedly) AnonyOps, as well as the NSA whistleblower Thomas Drake, WikiLeaks central editor Heather Marsh, and Wired reporter Quinn Norton. Eric Hughes, the author of A Cypherpunk's Manifesto nearly two decades before, delivered the keynote address, Putting the Personal Back in Personal Computers, at the Amsterdam CryptoParty on 2012-09-27.

Marcin de Kaminski, founding member of Piratbyrån which in turn founded The Pirate Bay, regarded CryptoParty as the most important civic project in cryptography in 2012, and Cory Doctorow has characterized a CryptoParty as being "like a Tupperware party for learning crypto." Der Spiegel in December 2014 mentioned "crypto parties" in the wake of the Edward Snowden leaks in an article about the NSA.

== See also ==
- Cyber self-defense
