= Internet Messaging Program =

Internet Messaging Program (IMP)
- Developer: The Horde Core Team
- Initial release: 1998; 28 years ago
- Stable release: 6.2.27 / 27 August 2020
- Written in: PHP
- Operating system: Cross-platform
- Available in: English, German and many others (multilingual)
- Type: Webmail
- License: GPL-2.0-only
- Website: www.horde.org/apps/imp

The Internet Messaging Program or IMP is a webmail client. It can be used to access e-mail stored on an IMAP server. IMP is written in PHP and a component of the collaborative software suite Horde.

It is included with cPanel and Plesk installations as a webmail client. It often integrates email, calendar, address book, notes, tasks, filters and a newsreader with cPanel.

Internet Messaging Program is free and open-source software subject to the terms of the GPL-2.0-only license.

== Features ==
- Dynamic (AJAX) view
- Mobile smartphone view
- Minimal (text-only) view
- HTML message composition with a cross-browser WYSIWYG editor
- Drag/drop attachment support into WYSIWYG editor
- HTML signatures
- High performance
- Robust IMAP support, utilizing advanced server features
- Flexible message search
- Address autocompletion
- Spell checking
- Sending of attachments via download link, instead of embedding in message
- Thread view
- Message previews in mailbox view
- Desktop like user interface and navigation (also via keyboard)
- IMAP folder support
- Management of shared IMAP folders (ACLs)
- Folder subscriptions
- Various identities
- Alias and "tied to" addresses in user identities
- Integration with e-mail filtering
- Integration with addressbook
- Integration with calendar
- S/MIME and PGP based encryption and signatures
- Mailbox quotas
- Ability to forward multiple messages at once
- Download of attachments as ZIP archive
- Stripping of attachments from messages
- Preview of attachments in compose view
- Priority settings for composed messages
- Message flags
- Graphical emoticons and country flags in message view
- Available in many languages
- Full charset support

== History ==
Chuck Hagenbuch published a first version of IMP on Freshmeat in 1998. A constant stream of feature requests not all fitting for a webmail application led to the development of a more generic web application backbone: the Horde framework. The release of IMP 3.0 and Horde 2.0 was the first one with two truly separate components. Since then any deployment of IMP can only run on top of a Horde installation.

SAPO uses IMP to provide several million users with a webmail platform. The company also sponsored the initial development of the dynamic AJAX variant of IMP which was released as a separate package, named DIMP, with the release of Horde 3.2.

Support for mobile clients was provided within 2006 for the first time. At that time a WAP based mobile view was provided by a separate package called MIMP.

With the release of Horde 4.0 the three existing views were collapsed into the original IMP package again. In addition another mobile view for smartphones was added based on the jQuery Mobile JavaScript framework.

== See also ==
- Horde
- SquirrelMail
- RoundCube
