= Sameer Parekh =

American businessman

Sameer Parekh is the founder of C2Net Software, Inc.

While in high school in Libertyville, Illinois, he published an underground newspaper called The Free Journal, promoting libertarian ideas.

In 1993 Parekh moved to Berkeley, California, to attend the University of California, Berkeley, and joined the cypherpunks. In his second year at Cal, he started C2Net, a privacy-oriented ISP which provided anonymous accounts and an anonymous remailer, and was the first home of the Anonymizer web surfing proxy.

Through the mid- to late 1990s, Parekh was a frequently cited critic of U.S. policy on encryption software. The cover story for the September 1997 issue of Forbes focused on his views of the political and social impact of cryptography. Through C2Net, Parekh pioneered the offshore development of cryptography by U.S. companies to avoid U.S. regulation, and later helped organize the first global conference on financial cryptography in Anguilla. He was also an advisor to and the chairman of HavenCo, a company that attempted to create a data haven in the Principality of Sealand.

After selling C2Net to Red Hat, Parekh traveled around Central and Eastern Europe in 2001 on a DJ tour. He played in countries such as Poland, Serbia, Croatia, Latvia. He also produced a number of "renegade" events in the Port of Oakland.

Parekh was a 2007 Lincoln Fellow of the Claremont Institute.

As of spring 2012, Parekh is the proprietor of Falkor Systems, a flying robot startup based in the New York area. In 2014, he was "Entrepreneur in Residence" at the Correll Robotics lab, University of Colorado at Boulder.

== See also ==
- Information security
