= Ritual killings in Gabon =

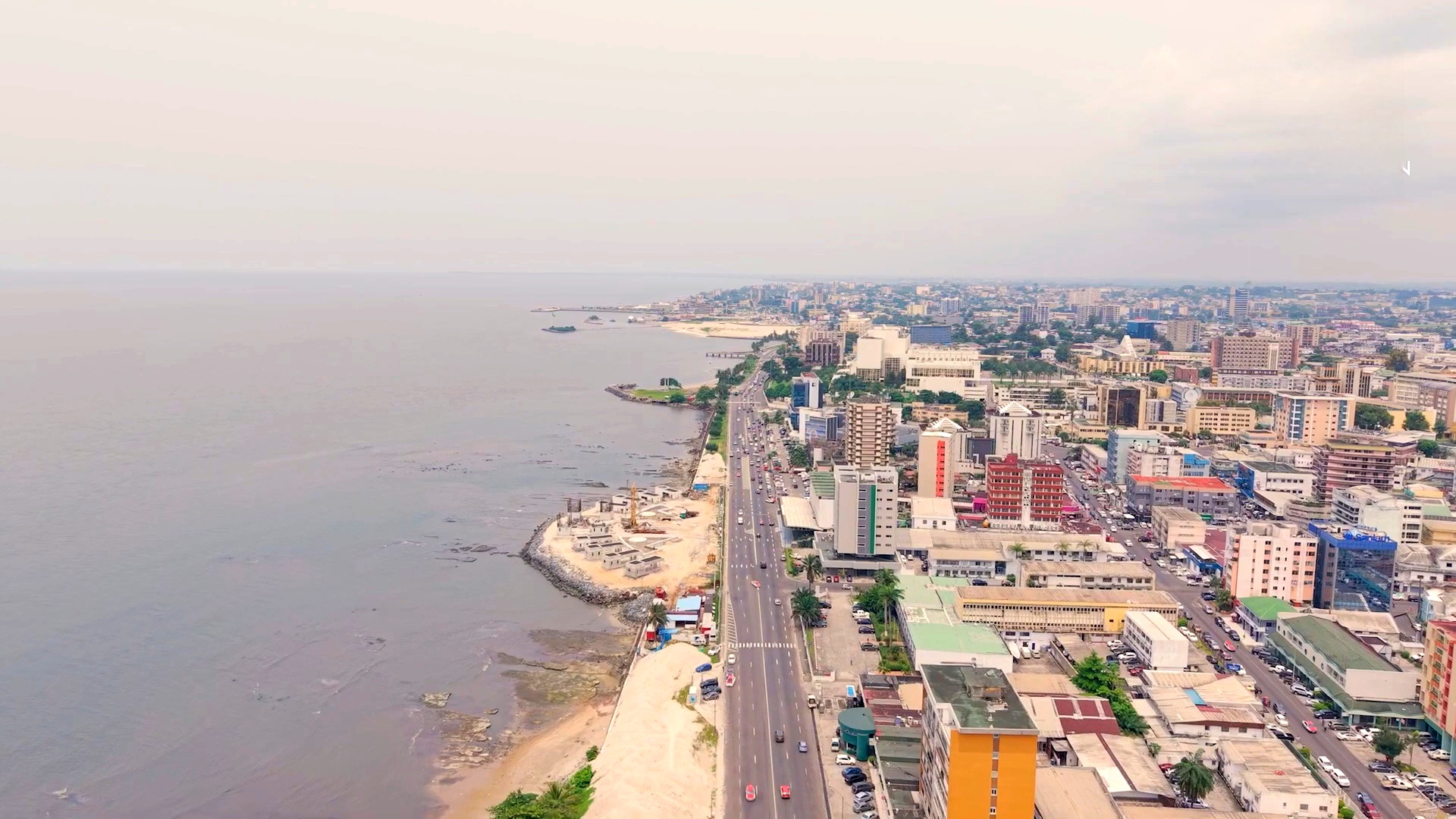
- Libreville, the capital of Gabon, where several cases of ritual killings have been reported since the 1990s.
- Date: Since the 1970s
- Location: Gabon Libreville, Oyem, Lambaréné, Franceville, Mouila, Port-Gentil, etc.
- Perpetrator: Witch doctors affiliated with secret societies

Ritual killings in Gabon refer to murders committed in the context of occult or esoteric practices, often tied to mystical beliefs or witchcraft, and allegedly motivated by the pursuit of power, spiritual protection, or social and political success.

These crimes typically involve the abduction of victims, mainly children, followed by targeted mutilations of certain body parts (organs, blood, skull), used in rituals with symbolic or magical intent.

They are regularly denounced by Gabonese civil society and international human rights organizations, but remain difficult to quantify due to their clandestine nature and the climate of fear surrounding investigations.

== Definition ==
Ritual murders generally refer to killings carried out in a context involving abduction, homicide, and fetishistic practices. These acts are often attributed to secret societies or influential members of the ruling class, particularly during election periods, and are motivated by the pursuit of power or material wealth.

Carried out by practitioners of witchcraft or fetish priests, these murders often involve extracting the blood of the victim while still alive, as well as certain parts of the body (organs, skull, etc.). According to a widespread belief, cited in a report by the French Office for the Protection of Refugees and Stateless Persons (OFPRA), the victim's suffering is considered essential to ensure the power of the fetish.

The victims are often children from disadvantaged backgrounds, immigrant families, or remote villages. Children with disabilities, illnesses, or deformities—as well as albino children—are particularly targeted by fetishists.

However, these crimes are not legally defined as such under Gabonese law. They belong more to popular and media-driven interpretations, which serve to describe the context of such killings rather than a precise legal category, making it difficult to quantify and classify cases.

In some cases, ordinary homicides are reportedly disguised as ritual killings through post-mortem mutilations, with the aim of diverting attention or manipulating public opinion. Organ trafficking is also cited as a possible motive in certain cases.

== History ==
=== Origins ===
The origins of ritual killings in Gabon are a subject of debate. These acts do not appear to stem directly from indigenous religious traditions, particularly Bwiti, whose initiation rites do not involve human sacrifice. Rather, such crimes are seen as a modern deviation or distortion of traditional beliefs, possibly influenced by more recent external practices.

The emergence of these practices is sometimes linked to the spread of witchcraft-related beliefs originating from Cameroon, the Congo, South Africa, or Nigeria, introduced to Gabon from the 1980s onward. Among them is the belief in “child witches,” popularized by certain evangelical revival churches in the Democratic Republic of the Congo, which later spread to Gabon. This phenomenon fits within a broader system of magical beliefs and practices in Central Africa, involving spirit worship, initiation rites, and even the trafficking of skulls and human remains—often coexisting with monotheistic religions and rationalist modernity.

According to some anthropologists, these crimes may be the result of political and social disruptions caused by colonialism and the introduction of neoliberal capitalism in Africa. As such, they represent a distortion of traditional animist beliefs, shaped by models of power, domination, and success drawn from the West.

Other analyses emphasize the symbolic and political dimensions of ritual killings. They are believed to be used by Gabonese elites as instruments of power assertion since the country's independence in 1960. Their use of mystical symbols—drawing from both Masonic esotericism and local animist traditions—has contributed to a culture of secrecy and fear surrounding these practices.

This perception is also rooted in a colonial-era imaginary that contrasts a “modern and civilized” coastal region with an interior viewed as primitive and wild. This spatial dualism, developed in the 19th century, has been gradually adopted and reinterpreted in contemporary representations of the phenomenon.

=== 1970s-1990s ===
The expression "ritual murder" (crime rituel) first emerged in Gabon in the 1970s, following several arrests related to acts believed to be part of such criminal practices.

The first known publication referring to a ritual killing in Gabon appeared in the 1983 book Affaires africaines by Pierre Péan. The author reported rumors circulating at the time about ritual crimes allegedly carried out for the benefit of Georges Rawiri, a prominent figure in the Gabonese Democratic Party, which was then the sole ruling party. Among the testimonies he cites is one claiming that a child's severed head had allegedly been seen in the car of Rawiri's secretary. Péan did not present these claims as established facts but rather as an illustration of the climate of suspicion surrounding certain members of Gabon's political elite in the 1980s.

Throughout the decade, several criminal cases involving high-ranking political or administrative figures reinforced the idea of systemic impunity in cases of ritual murder. In 1985, the Pandzou case ended with the release of the main suspect despite the seriousness of the allegations. Shortly thereafter, the Koung-Magang affair, involving a Lambaréné notable and brother-in-law of the then Minister of the Interior, was marked by the disappearance of key witnesses, which prevented legal prosecution. Between 1988 and 1989, the Mba Nteme case implicated several Gabonese political actors in a series of violent ritual practices, though no public convictions were ever made.

In 1990, during the country's first multiparty legislative elections, a case of alleged ritual murder was reported in Ogooué-Maritime Province after a victim escaped and alerted authorities. According to collected testimonies, a general recently elected as a member of parliament and a sitting ambassador were named as the masterminds behind the abduction. However, no legal action followed, and the alleged perpetrators reportedly benefited from high-level political protection.

Throughout the 1990s, several mutilated bodies were found on the beaches of Libreville. These discoveries triggered widespread fear among the population and fueled the spread of rumors about child abductions in various neighborhoods of the capital.

=== 2000s-2010s ===
In July 2005, UNESCO organized a regional conference in Libreville on the “causes and means of preventing ritual crimes and conflicts in Central Africa.” The initiative aimed to alert governments in the sub-region to the growing scale of the phenomenon, identify the social and cultural factors contributing to it, and promote prevention strategies at both the community and institutional levels.

In 2009, following the death of Omar Bongo—who had ruled Gabon since 1967—his son Ali Bongo rose to the presidency. This political transition triggered a sharp realignment of internal power structures. According to some observers, the resulting instability and dismantling of old networks created a climate conducive to a resurgence of occult practices. The ritual murder phenomenon reportedly increased significantly: according to UNICEF, the number of cases may have tripled during that period.

According the U.S. State Department in 2011, ritual killings were "the most important human rights problems in the country" along with "harsh prison conditions, and lengthy pretrial detention".

On January 14, 2012, the Gabonese gendarmerie carried out several arrests in connection with a ritual murder case. Among those detained was Illoubou Boussiengi, a departmental secretary of the Gabonese Democratic Party.

=== Growing international attention (from 2012) ===
On April 8, 2012, the French television channel Canal+ aired a documentary titled Les organes du pouvoir ("The Organs of Power"), focusing on the phenomenon of ritual killings in Gabon. The report, which highlighted alleged links between occult practices and political elites, triggered strong reactions in the country. In response, President Ali Bongo reportedly called an emergency meeting to demand an end to these practices.

The documentary's broadcast marked a turning point in media coverage of the issue. Previously treated as isolated crime stories, ritual killings began to gain visibility in national media and attracted international press attention. While this increased coverage was welcomed by some NGOs, it was also criticized for its sensationalist tone, which risked reinforcing stereotypes and fueling collective panic.

On March 19, 2013, the mutilated body of a 7-year-old girl was discovered on a beach in Libreville, sparking outrage in Gabon. Like similar cases, the murder was seen by many as connected to the upcoming local elections scheduled for December that year—a period often associated with a spike in ritual killings, according to several observers.

In reaction, a group of hackers claiming affiliation with the Anonymous movement launched an online campaign on April 15, 2013, titled “Operation Gabon,” calling out the Gabonese authorities over the alleged impunity surrounding such crimes.

On May 11, civil society associations, political parties, and religious movements organized a protest march in Libreville. The main march, which was joined by First Lady Sylvia Bongo, reportedly drew more than 3,000 participants, according to the Association for the Fight Against Ritual Crimes (ALCR).

At the end of the march, President Ali Bongo announced harsher criminal penalties for crimes involving organ removal, including life sentences without the possibility of parole.

That same day, an unauthorized counter-march organized by other civil society groups was quickly dispersed by police, resulting in the arrest of several human rights activists.

In June 2013, Senator Gabriel Eyéghé Ekomié of Kango was indicted in a ritual murder case after being accused of offering 20 million CFA francs to the killer of a 12-year-old girl.

In June 2014, the magazine Jeune Afrique reported that Gabonese police had opened an investigation into the disappearance of a dozen Cameroonian women in Makokou, the capital of Ogooué-Ivindo Province, which it described as “a stronghold of fetishist practices in northwestern Gabon.”

In December 2014, a man arrested in Mimongo, in southern Gabon, confessed to having committed 21 ritual murders.

=== 2020s ===
In January 2020, the capital city Libreville was shaken by riots following the viral spread of rumors on social media about child abductions. These rumors, involving mysterious disappearances and ritual mutilations, reignited a climate of collective fear already deeply rooted in the Gabonese public imagination.

In November 2020, Gabonese authorities launched the country's first hotline dedicated entirely to child victims of violence, named SuperMwana. The initiative aims to improve support for children facing physical abuse, sexual assault, and ritual-related crimes.

== Data and statistics ==
=== Victims ===
According to some estimates cited by French Office for the Protection of Refugees and Stateless Persons and UNICEF, children account for approximately 70% of ritual killing victims.

The Association for the Fight Against Ritual Crimes (ALCR), led by Jean-Elvis Ebang Ondo, reported in 2011 that it had recorded 62 cases of ritual crimes involving 28 children, 20 women, and 14 adult men.

The same association claimed that ritual killings had caused 443 deaths in Libreville between 2007 and 2012.

However, several observers and analysts point out that the data provided by ALCR—though it remains one of the main sources on the topic—sometimes show inconsistencies, making it difficult to reliably assess the actual scale of the phenomenon. These statistics are also contested by the Gabonese police, who argue that not all reported murders can be classified as ritual crimes.

According to an official report presented to the United Nations on August 9, 2017, 78 ritual crime cases were handled in the courts of Libreville, Oyem, Lambaréné, Franceville, Mouila, and Port-Gentil between 2011 and 2012.

=== Perpetrators and frequency ===
According to the Association for the Fight Against Ritual Crimes (ALCR), eight out of ten ritual killings in Gabon are believed to be linked to political figures—whether elected officials, senior civil servants, or members of the executive branch.

Electoral periods, cabinet reshuffles, or any major shifts in the balance of power are identified as particularly conducive times for these crimes, which are perceived as acts of symbolic consolidation or conquest of power.

In parallel, certain occult practices—such as grave desecrations or trafficking in human remains—also tend to increase during these same periods. These acts are believed to be driven by a desire for mystical protection or enhanced influence, often associated with esoteric or fetishist networks operating within the spheres of power.

== Efforts to combat ritual crimes ==
=== Legal and Judicial Framework ===
The new Gabonese Penal Code, which came into force in July 2019, includes several provisions specifically intended to suppress ritual crimes—although the term "ritual crime" is not explicitly used in the legal text. Instead, the law employs more technical phrases such as “transactions involving human remains or bones” and “trade in human flesh.”

Article 355 of the Penal Code directly targets this practice, stating: “A person found guilty of murder committed for the purpose of harvesting organs, tissues, blood, or any other part or product of the victim’s body shall be sentenced to life imprisonment. Murder followed by such harvesting for mercantile or ritual purposes is punished by the same sentence.”

Article 356 establishes the same penalty for any organ removal—or attempted removal—from a living person.

In addition, Article 343, which addresses human trafficking, includes aggravating circumstances when the crime is committed “for the purpose of servitude, slavery, or the removal of one or more organs,” especially when the victim is a minor.

=== International legal commitments ===
Gabon has ratified several international conventions aimed at protecting children and human rights, including the Convention on the Rights of the Child, the International Convention for the Protection of All Persons from Enforced Disappearance, and the African Charter on the Rights and Welfare of the Child.

However, despite this formal commitment to international norms, the domestic application of these legal instruments remains limited. According to several observers, Gabonese judges are often reluctant to base their rulings on these international texts, which are rarely invoked in cases related to children's rights or alleged ritual crimes.

=== Journalistic investigations ===
Attempts by both Gabonese and international press to investigate ritual crimes in Gabon have regularly faced political obstacles, notably pressure from the authorities.

In April 2012, the French channel Canal+ was reportedly targeted by attempts at intimidation by the Gabonese government, aiming to prevent the airing of the documentary Les organes du pouvoir, which critically addressed the phenomenon of ritual crimes in the country.

A few months later, in October 2012, the NGO Reporters Without Borders denounced the increasing pressure from the authorities on Gabonese journalists investigating ritual crimes and their links to political circles. The NGO specifically cited the case of Olivier Ndembi, a journalist with the pro-government newspaper L'Union, who was harassed by the police following an article he published on April 14, 2012.

=== Civil society initiatives ===
The Association for the Fight Against Ritual Crimes (Association de lutte contre les crimes rituels, ALCR) is the leading organization combating this phenomenon in Gabon. It was founded on March 3, 2005, in Libreville by Jean-Elvis Ebang Ondo, following the murder of two twelve-year-old children. The association regularly denounces the alleged inaction of Gabonese authorities in addressing ritual crimes.

The ALCR organizes awareness campaigns, public vigils, and commemorations, often in partnership with victims’ families. It also advocates for stronger legal action, greater protection for journalists and whistleblowers, and more robust witness safeguarding.

=== Catholic Church involvement ===
Since 2011, the Gabonese Episcopal Conference has commemorated a national day of remembrance for the victims of ritual crimes each year on December 28, coinciding with the Feast of the Holy Innocents in the Catholic liturgical calendar. This day, which symbolizes the biblical massacre of innocent children, has become a moment of prayer, public awareness, and condemnation of these practices.

The Catholic Church in Gabon has also been actively involved in civil society efforts. The Archbishop of Libreville, Basile Mve Engone, notably took part in the May 11, 2013 protest march organized by civil society groups to denounce ritual crimes and demand an end to impunity.

According to several testimonies, some clergy members have been intimidated due to their outspoken stance against ritual killings.

== Bibliography ==
- Minko Mve, Bernardin (2008). Manifeste contre les crimes rituels au Gabon (in French). Paris: L'Harmattan. ISBN 978-2-296-04906-2.
- Masungh-Ma-Ntchandi, Identsi (2022). "Les crimes rituels en Afrique" (PDF). HAL (in French).
- "Gabon. Les crimes rituels" (PDF). OFPRA (in French). 30 March 2018.
- Beddiar, Nadia; Cataleta, Maria Stefania (2022). "La protection des enfants face aux crimes rituels au Gabon" (PDF). Lexsociété (in French) 2836. doi:10.61953/lex.2836.

== See also ==
- Human sacrifices
- Witch-doctor
