= HavenCo =

Data hosting services company

- Industry: Computer industry
- Founded: 2000
- Defunct: 2008, revived circa 2013
- Fate: Defunct
- Headquarters: England, Principality of Sealand (unrecognised)
- Key people: Michael Bates, Sean Hastings, Ryan Donald Lackey
- Services: Web hosting service, Internet service provider
- Parent: Principality of Sealand
- Website: https://www.havenco.com/

HavenCo Limited was a data haven, data hosting services company, founded in 2000 to operate from Sealand, an unrecognised self-declared principality that occupies HM Fort Roughs off the coast of England.

In November 2008, operations of HavenCo ceased without explanation.

== History ==
On 22 August 2000, Michael Bates of Leigh-on-sea, Essex- also known as Prince Michael of Sealand- bought a dormant British company which was renamed HavenCo Limited. It was given the registration number 04056934 by Companies House, an executive agency of the UK Department of Trade and Industry. The registered office of HavenCo Limited was recorded at 11 Kintyre House, Cold Harbour, London, E14 9NL England. The directors were listed as Michael Roy Bates, a citizen of the United Kingdom, who was named Chief Operating Officer, and Ryan Donald Lackey, a US citizen. Other founders included Sean Hastings, Jo Hastings, Avi Freedman, and Sameer Parekh was an advisor to the company. The company later relocated its registration to Cyprus.

HavenCo initially received broad coverage in the international media, appearing on the cover of Wired Magazine, in over 200 press articles, and in several television reports. In these reports, HavenCo claimed to have established a secure colocation facility on Sealand, and that it had commenced operations as a data haven. Detractors claim that these reports gave the impression that HavenCo was registered on Sealand itself, and that the company would issue domain names under the authority of that entity, whereas it had no entitlement to do so.

Ryan Lackey left HavenCo under acrimonious circumstances in 2002, citing disagreements with the Bates family over management of the company. The HavenCo website went offline in 2008.

In 2013, Freedman announced plans for HavenCo to resume operation: offering proxies, VPNs, and other services using servers in the European Union and the United States, while storing encryption keys and other cold data in Sealand.
