= List of cryptography journals =

List of academic journals related to cryptography

List of cryptography journals includes notable peer-reviewed academic journals that focus on cryptography, cryptanalysis, information security, and related areas in computer science and mathematics.

== Notable journals ==
- Cryptologia
- Designs, Codes and Cryptography
- IEEE Transactions on Information Theory
- International Journal of Information Security
- Journal of Cryptology
- Journal of Computer Security
- ACM Transactions on Privacy and Security
- Information Processing Letters
- Information and Computation

== See also ==
- Crypto++
- Cryptography
- Information security
- List of computer science journals
- List of cryptographers
- List of mathematics journals
- List of open-source Cypherpunk software
- International Association for Cryptologic Research
