= Title V of the Patriot Act =

Title V: Removing obstacles to investigating terrorism is the fifth of ten titles which comprise the USA PATRIOT Act, an anti-terrorism bill passed in the United States after the September 11, 2001 attacks. It contains 8 sections regarding the capture and prosecution of terrorists.

== Payment of rewards ==
Section 501 of the Patriot Act allows the U.S. Attorney General to pay rewards pursuant of advertisements for assistance to the Department of Justice to combat terrorism and prevent terrorist acts. Rewards over $250,000 may not be made or offered without the personal approval of the Attorney General or President, and once the award is approved the Attorney General must give written notice to the Chairman and ranking minority members of the Committee on Appropriations and the Judiciary of the Senate and of the House of Representatives. These funds can be provided by any U.S. Executive agency, the U.S. Army, U.S. Navy or the U.S. Air Force.

Section 502 amended the State Department Basic Authorities Act of 1956 to allow the Department of State to offer rewards, in consultation with the Attorney General, for the full or significant dismantling of any terrorist organization and to identify any key leaders of terrorist organizations. It also amended the Act to give the Secretary of State authority to pay greater than $5 million if the Secretary determines it would prevent terrorist actions against the United States.

== DNA identification ==
The DNA Analysis Backlog Elimination Act of 2000 primarily allows U.S. States carry out DNA analyses for use in the FBI's Combined DNA Index System and to collect and analyse DNA samples of violent and sexual offenders. Section 3 of the Act mandates the collection of DNA samples of Federal prisoners who were convicted of murder, sexual abuse, child sexual abuse, involvement in sex trafficking, peonage and slavery, kidnapping, robbery or burglary; or for any military offense against the Uniform Code of Military Justice for which a sentence of confinement for more than one year may be imposed. Section 503 of the Patriot Act amended the DNA Analysis Backlog Elimination Act to include terrorism or crimes of violence in the list of qualifying Federal offenses.

== Coordination with law enforcement ==
Section 106 of the Foreign Intelligence Surveillance Act of 1978 (FISA) specifies how foreign intelligence information acquired by Federal officers using electronic surveillance may be used. Section 305 of FISA specifies how foreign intelligence information acquired by Federal officers through physical searches may be used. Section 504 of the Patriot Act modified FISA to allow Federal officers who acquire information through electronic surveillance or physical searches to consult with Federal law enforcement officers to coordinate efforts to investigate or protect against potential or actual attacks, sabotage or international terrorism or clandestine intelligence activities by an intelligence service or network of a foreign power.

== National security authorities ==
Three national security authorities were modified under title V of the Patriot Act. FISA granted counterintelligence access to telephone toll and transactional records through the use of National Security Letters (NSLs). It required electronic communication service providers to comply with a request for subscriber information and toll billing records information, or electronic communication transactional records when so asked by the FBI. The disclosure by any recipient of an NSL was prohibited as under § 2709(c) they were not able to tell anyone that the FBI had sought or obtained access to records of the person who was being targeted by the NSL. The Right to Financial Privacy Act of 1978 gives the FBI authority to require financial institutions to provide information about their customer’s or an entity’s financial records. The Fair Credit Reporting Act requires a consumer reporting agency to provide the FBI the names and addresses of all financial institutions at which a consumer maintains or has maintained an account.

Section 505 of the Patriot Act allowed the use of NSLs to be made by a Special Agent in charge of a Bureau field office. Previously only the Director or the Deputy Assistant Director of the FBI were able to certify such requests. The requests for counterintelligence access to telephone toll and transactional records made under FISA can ask for the name, address, length of service, and local and long distance toll billing records of a subscriber, or the name, address, and length of service of an employee of the provider. The Patriot Act modified all the authorities mentioned above to allow for requests for information to be granted only if written certification is provided that the information is "relevant to an authorized investigation to protect against international terrorism or clandestine intelligence activities, provided that such an investigation of a United States person is not conducted solely on the basis of activities protected by the first amendment to the Constitution of the United States".

In 2004, the American Civil Liberties Union (ACLU) filed a lawsuit on behalf of an unknown Internet Service Provider against the U.S. government (American Civil Liberties Union v. Ashcroft (2004)), contending that the NSLs used under 18 U.S.C. § 2709 violated the First and Fourth Amendments of the US Constitution. The ACLU's reasoning was that:

- Section 2709 failed to spell out any legal process whereby a telephone or Internet company could try to oppose an NSL subpoena in court, and
- Section 2709 prohibited the recipient of an NSL from disclosing that he had received such a request from the FBI, and outweighs the FBI's need for secrecy in counter-terrorism investigations.

The court granted the plaintiff's motion, agreeing that the NSLs violated the Fourth Amendment because their use "effectively bars or substantially deters any judicial challenge to the propriety of an NSL request". The court also found that the prohibitions of disclosure in 18 U.S.C. § 2709(c), which it described as being "unable to sever from the remainder of the statute", was an "unconstitutional prior restraint on speech in violation of the First Amendment".

== Extension of Secret Service jurisdiction ==
Section 1030 of Title 18 of the U.S. Code specifies punishments for various computer crimes. This includes unauthorized access via a computer to:

- restricted data relating to the design, manufacture, or use of atomic weapons; the production of special nuclear material; or the use of special nuclear material in the production of energy
- information contained in a financial record of a financial institution, department or agency of the United States or information from any protected computer
- any nonpublic computer of a U.S. department or agency.

It also includes knowingly committing fraudulent acts using a computer under a number of circumstances.

Section 506 of the Patriot Act gave the U.S. Secret Service jurisdiction to investigate offenses, though the FBI is given primary authority to investigate offenses relating to the unauthorized access to restricted data relating to atomic energy unless it affects the U.S. President, Vice President, President-elect, Vice President-elect, or their families or other related people. The Secret Service was also regiven authority to arrest those who commit bank fraud.

== Disclosure of educational records ==
In general, section 444 of the General Education Provisions Act restricts funding for educational institutions who restrict parental access to the educational records of their children, or who release information to members or organisations of the general public about students without the written consent of that student's parents. Section 507 of the Patriot Act added paragraph (j) to the General Education Provisions Act. This paragraph allows the U.S. Attorney General or Assistant Attorney General to collect and retain educational records relevant to an authorized investigation or prosecution of an offense that is defined as a Federal crime of terrorism which are in the possession of an educational agency or institution. The Attorney General or Assistant Attorney General must "certify that there are specific and articulable facts giving reason to believe that the education records are likely to contain information [that a Federal crime of terrorism may be being committed]." An education institution that produces education records in response to such a request is given legal immunity from any liability that rises from such a production of records.

== Disclosure of information from NCES surveys ==
The National Education Statistics Act of 1994 was amended to allow the U.S. Attorney General or Assistant Attorney General to submit a written application to a court of competent jurisdiction for an ex parte order to collect reports, records, and information from the National Center for Education Statistics (NCES) relating to investigations and prosecutions of a Federal crime of terrorism or an act of domestic or international terrorism. However, the National Education Statistics Act of 1994 was repealed by H.R.3801 (Pub. L. 103–382), otherwise known as an Act "[t]o provide for improvement of Federal education research, statistics, evaluation, information, and dissemination, and for other purposes".

== See also ==
- Warrant canary
