= C2Net =

Internet cryptography company

C2Net was an Internet cryptography company founded by Sameer Parekh, which was sold to Red Hat in 2000. It was best known for its Stronghold secure webserver software.

== Community ConneXion ==
C2Net started out as Community ConneXion in 1994, an Internet Privacy Provider similar to an Internet service provider providing customers with anonymous Internet services, from dialup access to email accounts. Community ConneXion implemented the first double-blind anonymous mail forwarding service, aka "nym server", as well as being the company that commercialized the Anonymizer before selling it to Lance Cottrell's Anonymizer Inc.

== Products: Stronghold and Safe Passage ==
After seeing a demand for an Apache-based SSL-capable web server, Sameer Parekh developed the first version of Stronghold by plugging together Apache with SSLeay, Apache-SSL, and a commercially licensed RSAref. The product was wildly successful but the company was unwilling to compromise security to get an export license for its products. Thus, C2Net purchased UKWeb, an Apache consultancy in Leeds, which independently re-engineered the Stronghold product (without RSAref) for the international market. This made C2Net the first American company to be capable of providing strong encryption solutions to a worldwide market.

Eventually C2Net hired the SSLeay developers Eric Young and Tim Hudson in Brisbane, Australia to develop more encryption products. C2Net's relationship with RSA Data Security, Inc. was rocky because C2Net was using unlicensed versions of RC4, RC2, and other RSA algorithms (rather than a version licensed from them directly), which made it possible to develop a full strength version of Stronghold outside of the United States. Eventually, C2Net and RSA Data Security, Inc. resolved their differences, and C2Net purchased a patent license for RSA and a license to use RC4 and RC2 within the United States. During merger negotiations between RSA and C2Net, RSA hired C2Net's Australian team and set up their own overseas development effort in Australia in order to produce the BSAFE-SSL product for worldwide sales. Other companies began to emulate this development strategy and the United States government subsequently relaxed restrictions on export of cryptographic technology.

C2Net also offered SafePassage client-side products, including a web proxy and also a Virtual Private Network (VPN).

== Hosting the first ApacheCon ==
In October, 1998, C2Net and the Apache Project hosted the first ApacheCon conference.

== New CEO and Sale to Red Hat ==
After losing the Australian office, C2Net focused primarily on selling and supporting Stronghold and hired a new CEO, Bill Rowzee. He brought the company back to profitability, and as the RSA patent was due to expire in 2000, they shifted the company's strategy to focus primarily on support. Finally, they sold the company to Red Hat in 2000 for around $42.7 Million.
