= ADN (newspaper) =

Spanish free daily newspaper

- Type: Daily free newspaper
- Format: Tabloid
- Owner: Grupo Planeta
- Publisher: Editorial Página Cero
- Price: Free
- Founded: March 2006
- Ceased publication: 23 December 2011
- Political alignment: Liberal
- Language: Spanish; Catalan
- Headquarters: Barcelona
- Circulation: 1,000,000
- Website: adn.es

ADN was a Spanish free daily newspaper from 2006 to 2011, published by Editorial Página Cero, a company owned by Grupo Planeta in association with several Spanish regional press groups. As of 2011, it was one of the four most highly circulated free newspapers in Spain. The paper had both a morning and an afternoon edition, as well as online edition at DiarioADN.com. Politically aligned with the Liberal Party, ADN was aimed at young urban professionals and was distributed in more than 12 municipalities across Spain. It covered general news, including breaking news, international affairs, politics, economics, society, technology, and sports, and was printed entirely in color.

From July 2007 to January 2009, it had an affiliated digital portal, ADN.es. According to OJD, ADN.es grew to a readership of 1,350,000 unique visitors.

In Colombia, a newspaper titled ADN has been published since September 2009 by Casa Editorial El Tiempo, with distribution in Bogotá, Medellín, Cali, and Barranquilla.

== History ==
ADN was first published in March 2006 as a new daily newspaper model designed for a young, urban population, covering News, Society, Sports, and Leisure. It targeted readers between the ages of 18 to 35, and stated that its objective was to deliver "timely, truthful and objective information", with analysis, photojournalism, and reader engagement. ADN covered the main cities and metropolitan areas in Spain, and reached a distribution of more than 1,000,000 copies. It differentiated itself from the other three major free newspapers in its use of a serif font, which media scholars have described as "modern" with "a certain elegance", avoiding the "sensationalism" of the other papers.

In July 2007, Planeta launched its digital portal, ADN.es. According to OJD, ADN.es averaged 1,350,000 unique visitors. Despite the growth in traffic, in January 2009, Planeta announced the closure of the digital portal due to an insufficient return on investment. At the time, ADN.es had an editorial staff of about 40 people. Planeta said that the online version of ADN newspaper (DiarioADN.com) which had a lower cost structure, would continue.

Due to the effects of the financial crisis in Spain and declining advertising revenues, ADN newspaper closed in 2011. The final issue was published on 23 December 2011.

== Contents ==
The newspaper covered general topics with an emphasis on local and national news. Its contents were organized into five sections.

- News - covering local, political, international, and economic affairs.
- Life - covering society, including events, health, technology, education, science, environment, and medicine.
- Sports - covering a range of sports, including football, basketball, motorsport, and tennis.
- Culture and Leisure - covering culture, literature, music, performing arts, painting, and film; celebrity news related to television, film, and music appeared in a subsection titled El Bulevar.
- Television and Radio - schedules and coverage of television and radio programming.
- Xpresate - a reader letters section in which editor Albert Montagut selected one letter for a published reply.

The paper also carried puzzles, horoscopes, and a comic strip.

== Editorial policy ==
ADN has described its editorial stance as liberal, expressing support for democratic values and social progress. It stated that it was unaffiliated with political or religious organizations, aimed to address readers across differing ideologies, and excluded content advocating violence or racial or sexual discrimination.

According to a study conducted by Orange Media in 2007, among those who believed that ADN had a political orientation, 45% placed it in the center-right or right, compared to 15% who considered it to be left-wing or center-left and 9% center-left.

== Collaborators ==
The newspaper ADN had several contributors who wrote for it on a weekly basis; notable among them were the columnists Lucía Etxebarría, Espido Freire, Risto Mejide, Montserrat Domínguez, and Mariola Cubells, among others.

== Circulation and offices ==
ADN was distributed via a network of local newspapers, combining sections common to all editions with content specific to each city or region. The newspaper was based in Barcelona and maintained offices and local editions in multiple cities.

The paper distributed localised editions to:

- A Coruña – Distribution of 28,000 copies. Branch closed in November 2008.
- Barcelona – Corporate headquarters in Agbar Tower. Distribution of 250,000 copies.
- Bilbao – Distribution of 45,000 copies.
- Cádiz – Staff cuts reported in November 2008.
- Castellón – Distribution of 17,000 copies.
- Málaga – Distribution of 45,000 copies. Staff cuts reported in November 2008.
- Madrid – Distribution of 380,000 copies.
- Palma de Mallorca – Distribution of 33,000 copies.
- Pamplona – Distribution of 24,000 copies.
- Sevilla – Staff cuts reported in November 2008.
- Valencia – Distribution of 55,000 copies.
- Vigo – Distribution of 33,000 copies. Branch closed in November 2008.
- Zaragoza – Distribution of 45,000 copies.

Between July 2009 and June 2010, average distributable circulation was 590,725, a 14% decline from the preceding year.

== ADN.es ==
From its launch, the ADN website aggregated content from the various print editions and included news relevant to regions without a local edition. It was regularly updated, provided multimedia content alongside written articles, and offered options for user customization.

From July 2007, ADN.es operated with its own editorial team as an independent company under the direction of Albert Montagut. Its editors included Carmen Álvarez, David Álvarez, Pedro de Alzaga, Mónica Arrizabalaga, Javier Bragado, Elena Cabrera, Diego Casado, José Manuel Comas, Marta Fernández Olmos, Ainhoa Gomà, Diana León, Mikel López Iturriaga, Enrique Mariño, Antonio Martínez, Meritxell Mir, Marta Miera, Adriano Morán, Marta Muñoz, Àlex Oller, Josefa Paredes, Fran Pastor, Marta Peirano, Antonio Pérez, Ángela Precht, Fernando Puente, Javier Pulido, David Sánchez de Castro, Mathieu de Taillac, Javier Timón, Yago García, Amanda Heredia, Íñigo Urquía, Manuel Valiño, and Lucía Villanueva.

On 9 January 2009, Grupo Planeta announced the closure of ADN.es, citing economic reasons. The more than forty employees working on the website were dismissed, and the site remained online with reduced updating, automated publication of wire reports, and support from the print edition's editorial staff.

== Contributors ==
The newspaper regularly featured contributions from columnists including Lucía Etxebarría, Espido Freire, Risto Mejide, Montserrat Domínguez, and Mariola Cubells, among others.

== Components ==
The newspaper's president was José Manuel Lara Bosch; the chief executive officer was José Sanclemente; the director from 2007 was Albert Montagut; the deputy director was Andrés Gil. The editors-in-chief were Olga Amigó, Mariola Cubells, Beatriz Lucas, Pilar Maurell, Yolanda Ortiz de Arri, and Lluís Regás, and the section heads included Daniel R. Caruncho, Natalia Chientaroli, Carmen Fernández, and Miqui Otero.

Several journalists who later developed careers in the media sector include Thaïs Gutiérrez, Lluís Tusell, Anna Lladó, Ainhoa Gomà, Amanda Heredia, Yolanda Ortiz de Arri, Clara de Cominges, and Mikel López Iturriaga. Since their time at ADN, a group of former staff members has met annually in May to attend or follow the Eurovision Song Contest.

== Permanent closure in Spain ==
ADN's final print edition was published on 23 December 2011, and its final online edition appeared on 30 December 2011, after which the newspaper ceased publication in Spain.

== See also ==
- ADN (Colombian newspaper)
- Público (España)
- Libertad Digital
