= Data haven =

Refuge for unregulated data

A data haven, like a corporate haven or tax haven, is a refuge for uninterrupted or unregulated data. Data havens are locations with legal environments that are friendly to the concept of a computer network freely holding data and even protecting its content and associated information. They tend to fit into three categories: a physical locality with weak information-system enforcement and extradition laws, a physical locality with intentionally strong protections of data, and virtual domains designed to secure data via technical means (such as encryption) regardless of any legal environment.

Tor's onion space, I2P (both hidden services), HavenCo (centralized), and Freenet (decentralized) are four models of modern-day virtual data havens.

== Purposes of data havens ==
Reasons for establishing data havens include access to free political speech for users in countries where censorship of the Internet is practiced.

Other reasons can include:

- Whistleblowing
- Distributing software, data or speech that violates laws such as the DMCA
- Copyright infringement
- Circumventing data protection laws
- Online gambling
- Pornography
- Cybercrime
- Privacy
- Geopolitical tension

== History of the term ==
The 1978 report of the British government's Data Protection Committee expressed concern that different privacy standards in different countries would lead to the transfer of personal data to countries with weaker protections; it feared that Britain might become a "data haven". Also in 1978, Adrian Norman published a mock consulting study on the feasibility of setting up a company providing a wide range of data haven services, called "Project Goldfish".

Science fiction novelist William Gibson used the term in his novels Count Zero and Mona Lisa Overdrive, as did Bruce Sterling in Islands in the Net. The 1990s segments of Neal Stephenson's 1999 novel Cryptonomicon concern a small group of entrepreneurs attempting to create a data haven.

== See also ==
- Corporate haven
- Crypto-anarchism
- International Modern Media Institute
