= Timothy C. May =

American writer, engineer and scientist (1951–2018)

Timothy C. May, better known as Tim May (December 21, 1951 – December 13, 2018), was an American technical and political writer, and electronic engineer and senior scientist at Intel. May was also the founder of the crypto-anarchist movement. He retired from Intel in 1986 at age 35 and died of natural causes at his home on December 13, 2018 at age 66.

== Discovery of alpha particle effects on computer chips ==
As an engineer, May was most noted for having identified the cause of the "alpha particle problem", which was affecting the reliability of integrated circuits as device features reached a critical size where a single alpha particle could change the state of a stored value and cause a single event upset. May realized that the ceramic packaging that Intel was using, made from clay, was very slightly radioactive. Intel solved the issue by increasing the charge in each cell to reduce its susceptibility to radiation and adopting plastic packaging for their products.

May co-authored the 1981 IEEE W.R.G. Baker Award-winning paper "Alpha-Particle-Induced Soft Errors in Dynamic Memories", published in the IEEE Transactions on Electron Devices in January 1979 with Murray H. Woods.

== Social and political views ==
May was an advocate for libertarianism and for internet privacy.

He was a founding member of, and had been one of the most voluminous contributors to, the Cypherpunks electronic mailing list. He wrote extensively on cryptography and privacy from the 1990s through 2003.

May wrote a substantial cypherpunk-themed FAQ, "The Cyphernomicon" (incorporating his earlier piece "The Crypto Anarchist Manifesto"); and his essay, "True Nyms and Crypto Anarchy", was included in a reprint of Vernor Vinge's novel True Names. In 2001 his work was published in the book, Crypto Anarchy, Cyberstates, and Pirate Utopias.

Writing in Harper's, Finn Brunton said of May, "He called himself a 'crypto-anarchist,' but his anarchism was of the American libertarian variety, which fuses smash-the-state rhetoric with racism, greed, and an interest in real-world violence. He wrote with approval that the collapse of the U.S. government would result in the end of welfare for 'inner-city breeders,' and day-dreamed about using digitally identifying 'race bits' so that online white-supremacist groups could maintain racial segregation."

May led a reclusive life. His New York Times obituary noted: "He often wrote about arming himself and waiting for government agents to show up. After the Cypherpunks faded in the early 2000s, he began expressing racist sentiments to other online groups".

Reason Magazine described him as a "significant influence on both bitcoin and WikiLeaks" in their obituary.

== See also ==
- Time-lock puzzle
