= Financial cryptography =

Financial cryptography is the use of cryptography in applications in which financial loss could result from subversion of the message system. Financial cryptography is distinguished from traditional cryptography in that for most of recorded history, cryptography has been used almost entirely for military and diplomatic purposes.

Financial cryptography includes the mechanisms and algorithms necessary for the protection of financial transfers, in addition to the creation of new forms of money. Proof of work and various auction protocols fall under the umbrella of Financial cryptography. Hashcash is being used to limit spam.

Financial cryptography has been seen to have a very broad scope of application. Ian Grigg sees financial cryptography in seven layers, being the combination of seven distinct disciplines: cryptography, software engineering, rights, accounting, governance, value, and financial applications. Business failures can often be traced to the absence of one or more of these disciplines, or to poor application of them. This views Financial cryptography as an appropriately cross-discipline subject. Indeed, inevitably so, given that finance and cryptography are each built upon multiple disciplines.

== History ==
Cryptographers think the field originated from the work of David Chaum who invented the blind signature. The blind signature is a special form of a cryptographic signature which allowed virtual coins to be signed without the signer seeing the actual coin. It permitted a form of digital token money that prevented traceability. This form is sometimes known as digital currency. Similar concepts are now being applied to modern blockchain technologies.

A system that was widely used during the 1970s-1990s and previously developed cryptographic mechanism is the Data Encryption Standard, which was used primarily for the protection of electronic funds transfers. However, it was the work of David Chaum that excited the cryptography community about the potential of encrypted messages as actual financial instruments.

As part of a business model, Financial cryptography followed the guide of cryptography and only the simplest ideas were adopted. Account money systems protected by SSL such as PayPal and e-gold were relatively successful. In 2001, PayPal processed $3.1 billion in payments, averaging 189,000 transactions daily totaling $9.6 million.

But more innovative mechanisms, including blinded token money, struggled to gain traction. David Chaum's DigiCash, opened in 1989, filed for bankruptcy protection in November 1998. Two competitive rivals also failed to remain viable. First Virtual Holdings abandoned its business in August 1998. CyberCash ceased its "CyberCoin" in early 1999.

== Associations ==
Financial cryptography is to some extent organized around the annual meeting of the International Financial Cryptography Association, which is held each year in a different location.

== See also ==
- Automated teller machines (ATM)
- Bitcoin
- Blockchain
- Cryptoeconomics
- Digital currency
- Monero (cryptocurrency)
- Point-of-sale (POS)
- Hardware security modules (HSM)
- Payment system
- Smart contracts
- Economics of security
- Bilateral key exchange
