= Justin Cappos =

American computer scientist (born 1977)

- Born: February 27, 1977 (age 49)
- Education: University of Arizona
- Scientific career
- Fields: Security, operating systems, networks
- Thesis: (2008)
- Doctoral advisor: John Hartman
- Website: engineering.nyu.edu/people/justin-cappos ssl.engineering.nyu.edu/personalpages/jcappos/

Justin Cappos (born February 27, 1977) is a computer scientist and cybersecurity expert whose data-security software has been adopted by a number of widely used open-source projects. His research centers on software update systems, security, and virtualization, with a focus on real-world security problems.

Cappos has been a faculty member at New York University Tandon School of Engineering since 2011, and was awarded tenure in 2017. Now an associate professor in the Department of Computer Science and Engineering, he has introduced a number of new software products and system protocols as head of the school's Secure Systems Laboratory. These include technologies that detect and isolate security faults, secure private data, provide a secure mechanism for fixing software flaws in different contexts, and even foster a deeper understanding about how to help programmers avoid security flaws in the first place.

Recognizing the practical impact of his work, Popular Science selected Cappos as one of its Brilliant 10 in 2013, naming him as one of 10 brilliant scientists under 40. His awareness of the risks of today's connected culture—a knowledge strong enough to keep him from owning a smartphone or other connected device, or from using social media like Facebook and Twitter—has led to numerous requests to serve as an expert commentator on issues of cyber security and privacy for local, national, and international media.

== Education and early research initiatives ==
The topic of Cappos' Ph.D. dissertation at the University of Arizona was the Stork Project, a software package manager he built with John H. Hartman, a professor in the Department of Computer Science. Stork is still used today in some applications, but, more importantly, the project called attention to the need for improved security for software update processes, a research area Cappos has continued to pursue.

While a post-doctoral researcher at the University of Washington in 2009, Cappos also developed a peer-to-peer computing platform called Seattle, which allows device-to-device connectivity in a decentralized network. Seattle is currently used by thousands of developers, who can access, download, and use the program on any type of smart device. In addition, spin-off technologies, such as Sensibility Testbed, have extended the use of Seattle's security and enforced privacy protection strategies, allowing researchers to collect data from sensors at no risk to the privacy of the device owner.

== Compromise-resilient strategies ==
In 2010, Cappos developed The Update Framework (TUF), a flexible software framework that builds system resilience against key compromises and other attacks that can threaten the integrity of a repository. TUF was designed for easy integration into the native programming languages of existing update systems, and since its inception, it has been adopted or is in the process of being integrated by a number of high-profile open-source projects. One of the more significant earlier adoptions was Docker Content Trust. an implementation of the Notary project from Docker that deploys Linux containers. Notary, which is built on TUF, can certify the validity of the sources of Docker images. In October 2017, Notary and TUF were both adopted as hosted projects by the Linux Foundation as part of its Cloud Native Computing Foundation. In December 2019, TUF became the first specification and first security-focused project to graduate from CNCF. TUF has also been standardized in Python, and been independently implemented in the Go language by Flynn, an open-source platform as a service (PaaS) for running applications in production. To date, the list of tech companies and organizations using TUF include Foundries.io,IBM, VMware, Digital Ocean, Microsoft, Google, Amazon, Leap, Kolide, Docker, and Cloudflare.

Another significant compromise-resilient software update framework by Cappos is the 2017 launch of a TUF-adapted technology called Uptane. Uptane is designed to secure software updates for automobiles, particularly those delivered via over-the-air programming. Developed in partnership with the University of Michigan Transportation Research Institute and the Southwest Research Institute, and in collaboration with stakeholders in industry, academia, and government, Uptane modifies the TUF design to meet the specific security needs of the automotive industry. These needs include accommodating computing units that vary greatly in terms of memory, storage capability, and access to the Internet, while preserving the customizability manufacturers need to design cars for specific client usage. To date, Uptane has been integrated into OTA Plus and ATS Garage, two over-the-air software update products from Advanced Telematic Systems, and is a key security component of the OTAmatic program created by Airbiquity. The Airbiquity project was honored with a BIG Award for Business in the 2017 New Product Category in January 2018, and Popular Science magazine named Uptane one of the top 100 inventions for 2017. The first standard volume issued for the project, entitled IEEE-ISTO 6100.1.0.0 Uptane Standard for Design and Implementation, was released on July 31, 2019. Uptane is now a Joint Development Foundation project of the Linux Foundation, operating under the formal title of Joint Development Foundation Projects, LLC, Uptane Series.

== Other significant research projects ==
In 2016, Cappos introduced in-toto, an open metadata standard that provides documentation of the end-to-end security of a software supply chain. The framework gathers both key information and signatures from all who can access a piece of software through the various stages of coding, testing, building and packaging, thus making transparent all the steps that were performed, by whom and in what order. By creating accountability, in-toto can prevent attackers from either directly introducing malicious changes into the code, or from altering the metadata that keeps the record of those changes along the supply chain. in-toto has collaborated with open source communities such as Docker and OpenSUSE. Datadog utilizes both in-toto and TUF. In December 2020, the framework released its first major version.

While working on in-toto, Cappos and the SSL research group identified metadata manipulation as a new threat against Version Control Systems like Git. His team has developed several new approaches to address this problem, including a defense scheme that mitigates these attacks by maintaining a cryptographically-signed log of relevant developer actions. By documenting the state of the repository at a particular time when an action is taken, developers are given a shared history, so irregularities are easily detected. One recent accomplishment in this research arena is Arch Linux integrating a patch to check for invalid tags in git into the next release of its pacman utility. More recently, Cappos and his collaborators have focused on development of a browser extension that can ensure users of convenient web-based hosting services, such as GitHub or GitLab, that the server will faithfully carry out their requested actions.

Another Cappos project, developed in 2014, introduced a method to make passwords for databases harder to crack. PolyPasswordHasher, is a secure scheme that interrelates stored password data, forcing hackers to crack passwords in sets. By making it significantly harder for attackers to figure out the necessary threshold of passwords needed to gain access, PolyPasswordHasher-enabled databases become very difficult to breach. PPH is currently used in several projects, including the Seattle Clearinghouse and BioBank. Implementations are available for seven languages, including Java, Python, C, and Ruby.
