= Dingledine =

Dingledine is a surname. Notable people with the surname include:

- Raymond Dingledine (born 1948), American pharmacologist and neurobiologist
- Roger Dingledine, American computer scientist
