= GoodbyeDPI =

Software tool to avoid Internet restrictions

- GoodbyeDPI logo, an edited Roskomnadzor logo stylized to resemble the Goatse image of a man stretching his anus

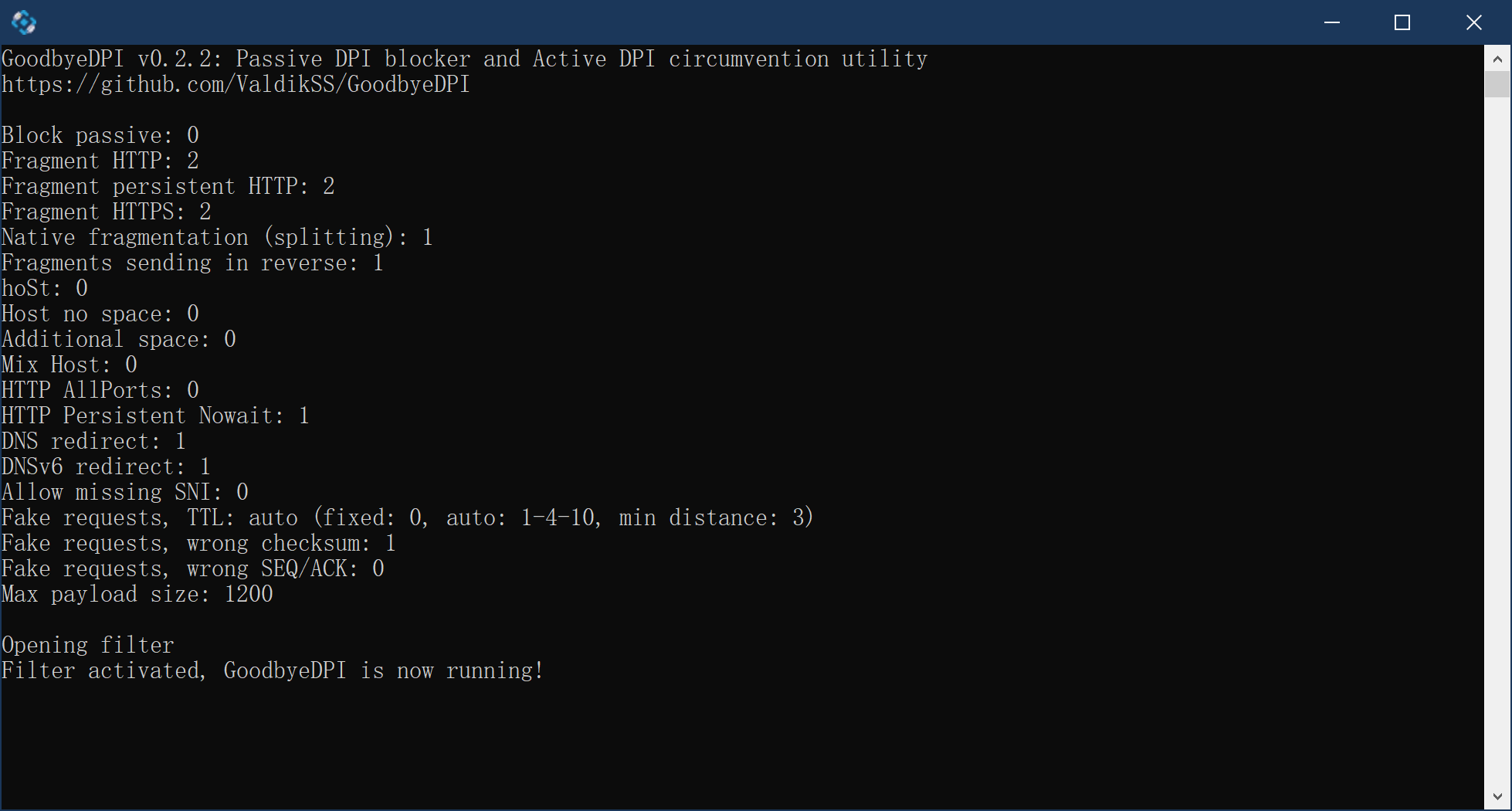
- Developer: ValdikSS
- Release: 2016
- Operating system: Windows XP SP3 and later
- License: Apache License
- Website: github.com/ValdikSS/GoodbyeDPI
- Repository: github.com/ValdikSS/GoodbyeDPI

GoodbyeDPI is a free and open-source software tool for bypassing deep packet inspection (DPI) systems and Internet censorship. It was created by Russian developer ValdikSS in 2016 and is distributed under the Apache License via GitHub.

== History ==
GoodbyeDPI was first released in 2016 as an experimental tool to study DPI-based filtering in Russia.

In 2024, the program gained wide popularity after the deliberate throttling of YouTube in Russia. Independent outlets reported it as one of the main tools used to circumvent restrictions.

== Technical overview ==
GoodbyeDPI uses the WinDivert library to intercept and modify network traffic at the Windows driver level. It manipulates packets in ways that make DPI systems unable to properly recognize them, allowing access to blocked resources.

Main techniques include:

- fragmentation of TCP packets;
- modification of HTTP headers;
- SNI obfuscation in TLS sessions;
- insertion of non-standard TCP flags.

== Usage ==
The program is distributed as a Windows console utility and configured via command-line parameters. Media reports and users describe it as effective for bypassing YouTube throttling and other restrictions.

GoodbyeDPI has also been reported as used to bypass blocking of Telegram, LinkedIn and several foreign media outlets.

The software is available only on Windows.

== Reception ==
- Meduza reported that the tool helps to bypass YouTube throttling but requires careful setup and may interfere with some services.
- The Insider noted its rising popularity and warned of fake builds spreading online.
- Research by OONI has cited GoodByeDPI as an example of client-side packet segmentation tools used to evade filtering.

== Legal status ==
While direct penalties for end users have not been documented, Russian law empowers Roskomnadzor to block sites distributing circumvention software or instructions, including VPNs and DPI bypass tools.
