= Paul Syverson =

American computer scientist

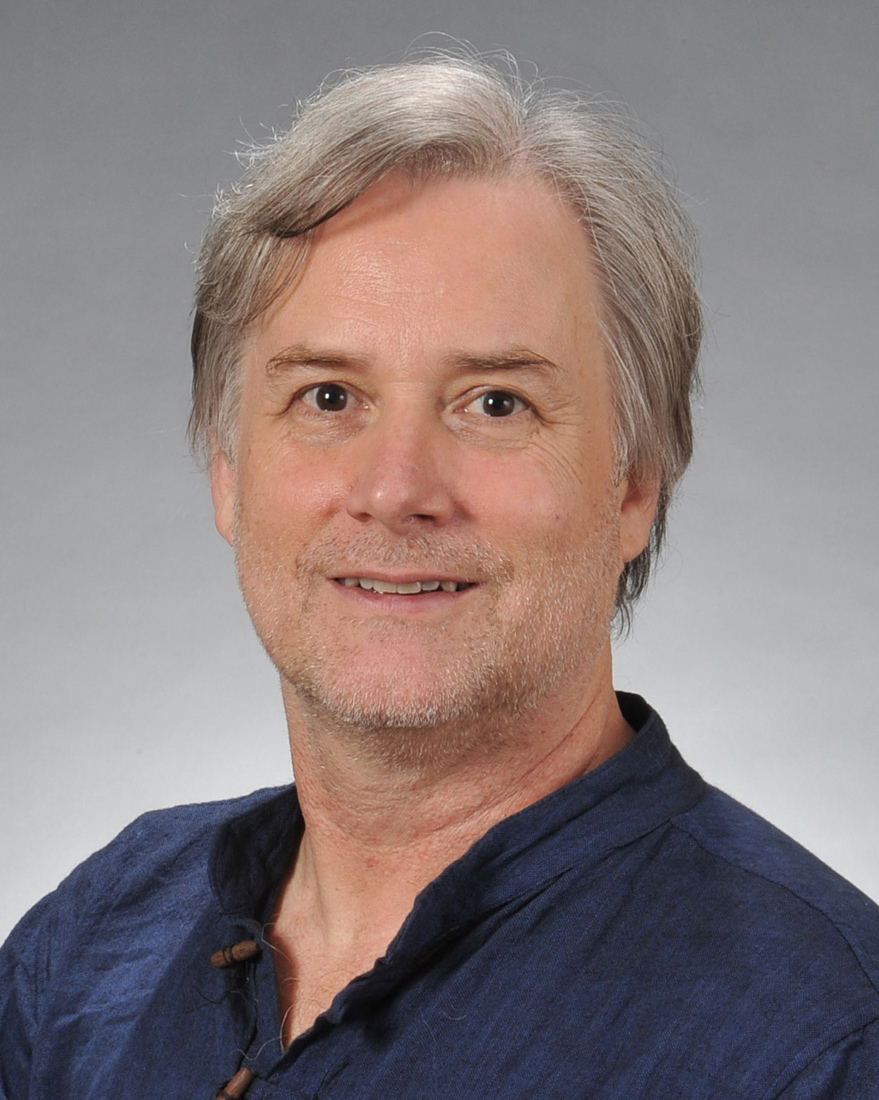
- Known for: Invention of onion routing

Academic background
- Education: Indiana University Bloomington

Academic work
- Discipline: Mathematics
- Institutions: Center for High Assurance Computer Systems, US Naval Research Laboratory
- Main interests: Traffic-secure communications

Paul Syverson is an American computer scientist best known for inventing onion routing, a feature of the Tor anonymity network.

In 2012, Foreign Policy magazine named Syverson, and Tor's co-creators Roger Dingledine and Nick Mathewson, among its Top 100 Global Thinkers "for making the web safe for whistleblowers".

In 2014, Syverson was named a Fellow of the Association for Computing Machinery.
