= OONI =

Project studying manipulation of Internet traffic worldwide

Open Observatory of Network Interference (OONI)
- Formation: 2012; 14 years ago
- Type: Non-governmental organization
- Website: ooni.org

The Open Observatory of Network Interference (OONI) is a project that monitors internet censorship globally. It relies on volunteers to run software that detects blocking and reports the findings to the organization. As of June 2023, OONI has analyzed 1,468.4 million network connections in 241 countries.

== Development ==
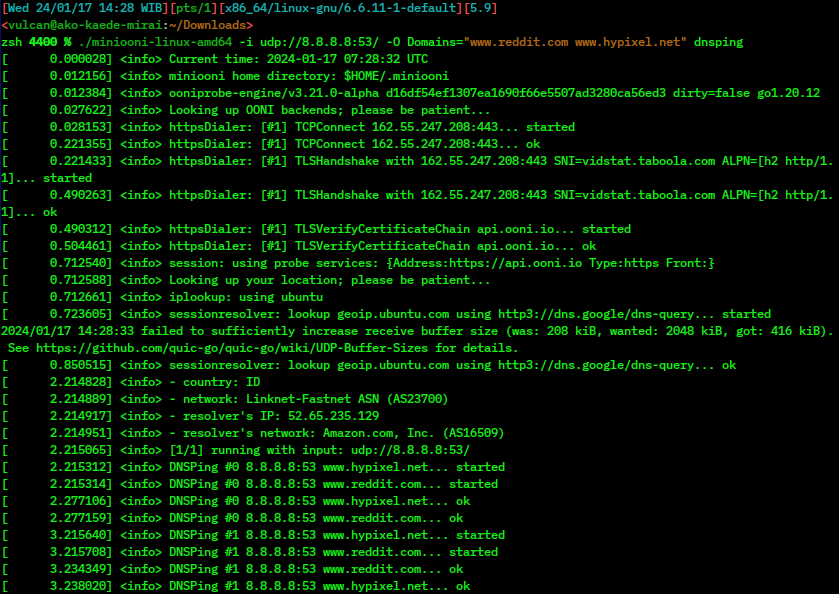
Screenshot of miniooni command line software

OONI was officially launched in 2012 as a free software project under The Tor Project, aiming to study and showcase global internet censorship. In 2017, OONI launched OONI Probe, a mobile app that runs a series of network measurements. These measurements detects blocked websites, apps, and other tools in addition to the presence of middleboxes. Results of these tests can be utilized through the OONI Explorer and API.

Till 2018 the project received $1,286,070 of funding from the Open Technology Fund.

== Tests ==
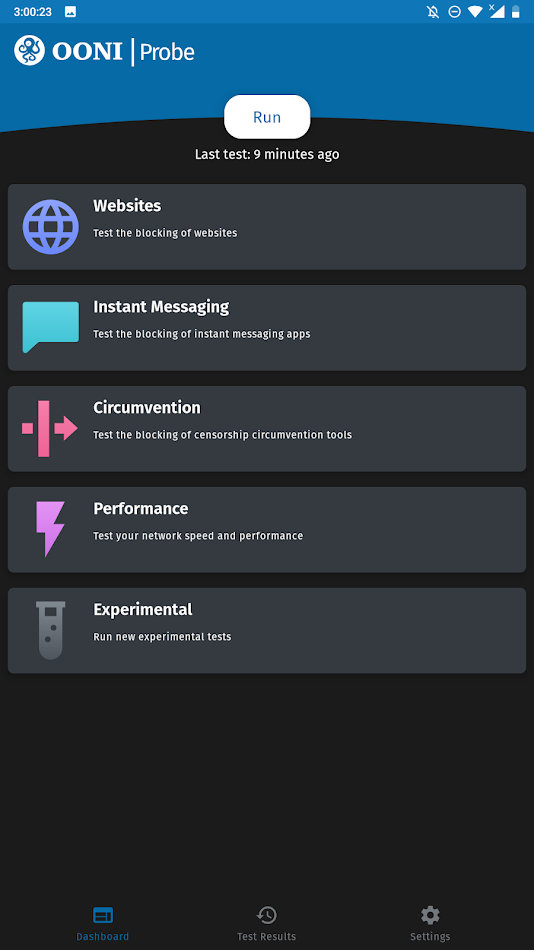
Screenshot of OONI Probe app dashboard

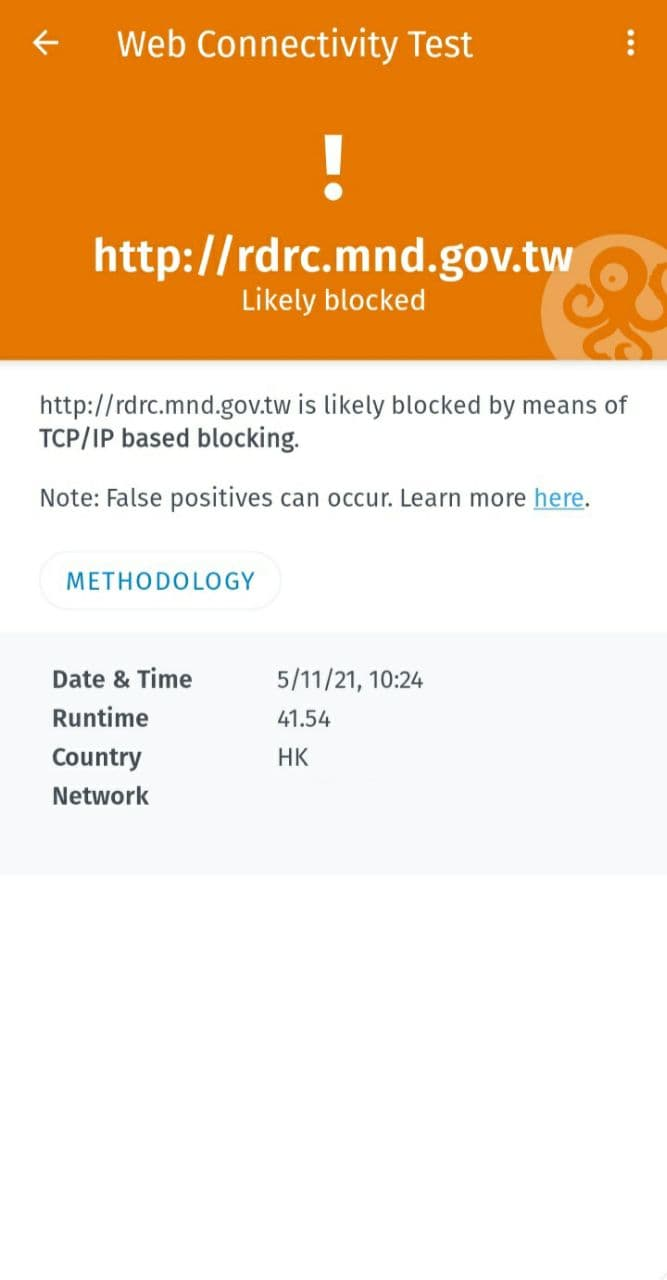
Screenshot of OONI Probe app stating a website might have been blocked by means of TCP/IP based blocking.

The current tests deployed by OONI are as follows:

- Web connectivity
- DNS consistency
- HTTP host
- HTTP requests
- Facebook Messenger access
- Telegram access
- WhatsApp access
- Signal access
- HTTP header field manipulation detection
- HTTP invalid request line detection
- Meek fronted requests
- Tor bridge access
- Vanilla Tor access
- Lantern access
- Psiphon access
- Dynamic Adaptive Streaming over HTTP streaming
- NDT (Network Diagnostic Test)

== Notable cases ==
OONI has confirmed data analyzing the 2019 Internet blackout in Iran. On 24 February 2019, Cuban independent news outlet Tremenda Nota confirmed the blocking of its website a few hours before a referendum in Cuba. A new Constitution was voted in the country for the first time in decades. OONI network measurement data confirmed the blocking of the site along with several other independent media websites during the referendum. The network had previously confirmed 41 websites blocked in the country in 2017. Cases of internet censorship and network disruptions during elections have also been detected in Benin, Zambia, and Togo. In May 2019, OONI reported that the Chinese Government blocked all language editions of Wikipedia. Following the 2022 Russian invasion of Ukraine, OONI confirmed that most Russian Internet Service Providers started blocking access to Twitter, Facebook, Instagram, BBC, Deutsche Welle, Radio Free Europe, Voice of America, Interfax, Meduza, TV Rain, The New Times and 200rf (a website launched by the Ministry of Internal Affairs of Ukraine to enable Russians to find their family members who were captured or killed during the war).
