= Nick Mathewson =

American computer scientist

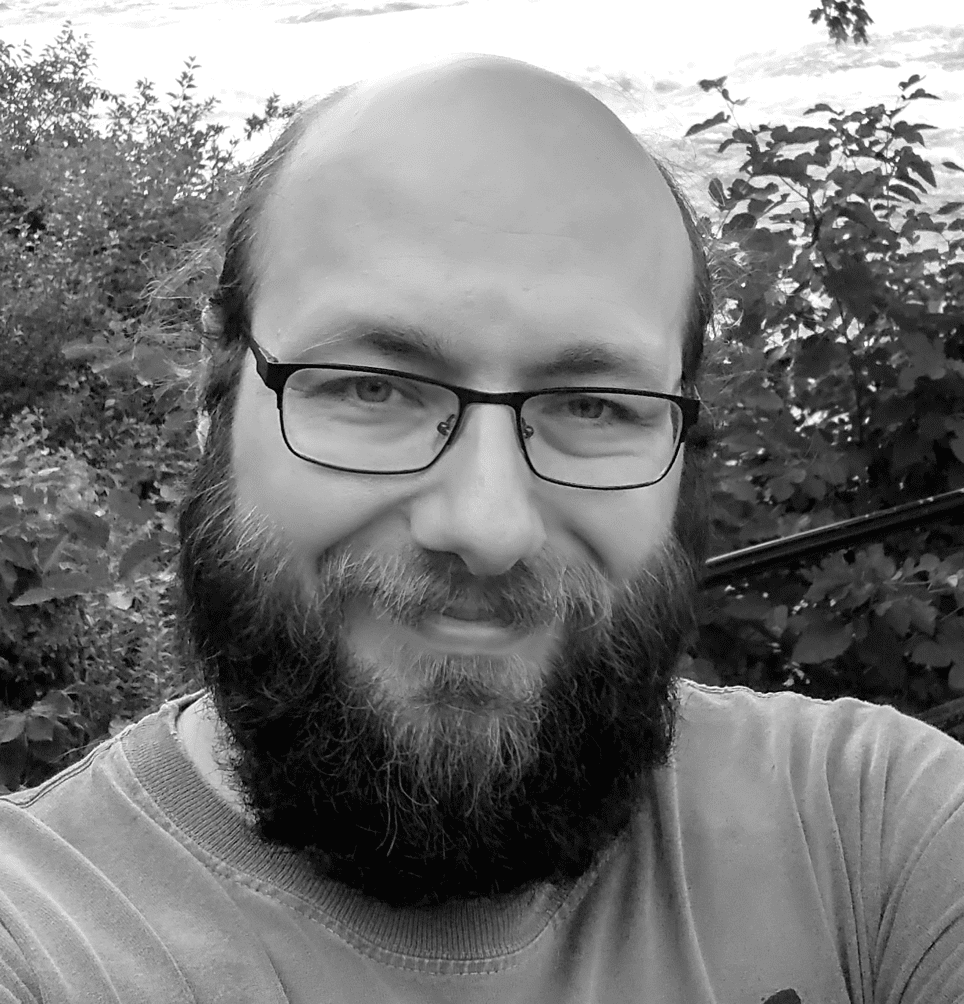
- Nick Mathewson in 2020
- Born: Nick Mathewson; United States
- Other names: nickm
- Occupation(s): Chief Network Architect, Tor Project
- Known for: Co-Founding Tor and the Tor Project
- Website: wangafu.net

Nick Mathewson is an American computer scientist and co-founder of The Tor Project. He, along with Roger Dingledine, began working on onion routing shortly after they graduated from Massachusetts Institute of Technology (MIT) in the early 2000s. He is also known by his pseudonym nickm. Mathewson and Dingledine were the focus of increased media attention after the leak of NSA's highly classified documents by Edward Snowden, and the subsequent public disclosure of the operation of XKeyscore, which targeted one of The Tor Project's onion servers along with Mixminion remailer which are both run at MIT.

== Education ==
Mathewson graduated from MIT in 2002, earning a Bachelor of Science degree in Computer Science. He later earned a Master of Engineering in Computer Science and Linguistics from MIT.

== Works ==
=== The Tor Project ===
Tor was developed by Mathewson, along with his two colleagues, under a contract from the United States Naval Research Laboratory. Mathewson is also lead developer responsible for the security, design, and maintenance of the Tor protocol, along with sending out security patches.

=== libevent ===
He is also the primary maintainer for libevent, an event notification library used by some prominent applications like Google Chrome, Transmission and also Tor.

== Honors ==
Mathewson, along with the other two developers of the Tor Project, Roger Dingledine and Paul Syverson, were recognized in 2012, by Foreign Policy magazine as #78 in their list of the top 100 global thinkers of the year.

== Selected publications ==
- Mathewson, Nick; Dingledine, Roger; Syverson, Paul (1 January 2004). "Tor: The Second-Generation Onion Router". usenix.org. Defense Technical Information Center.
- Mathewson, Nick; Johnson, Aaron M.; Syverson, Paul; Dingledine, Roger (17 October 2011). Trust-based anonymous communication: adversary models and routing algorithms. CCS '11. Association for Computing Machinery. doi:10.1145/2046707.2046729. ISBN 9781450309486. S2CID 2543268.
- Mathewson, Nick; Dingledine, Roger (11 May 2003). "Mixminion: Design of a Type III Anonymous Remailer Protocol". Proceedings 19th International Conference on Data Engineering (Cat. No.03CH37405). Institute of Electrical and Electronics Engineers. pp. 2–15. doi:10.1109/SECPRI.2003.1199323. ISBN 0-7695-1940-7. S2CID 9924523.
