= Raymond Dingledine =

American pharmacologist, neurobiologist (born 1948)

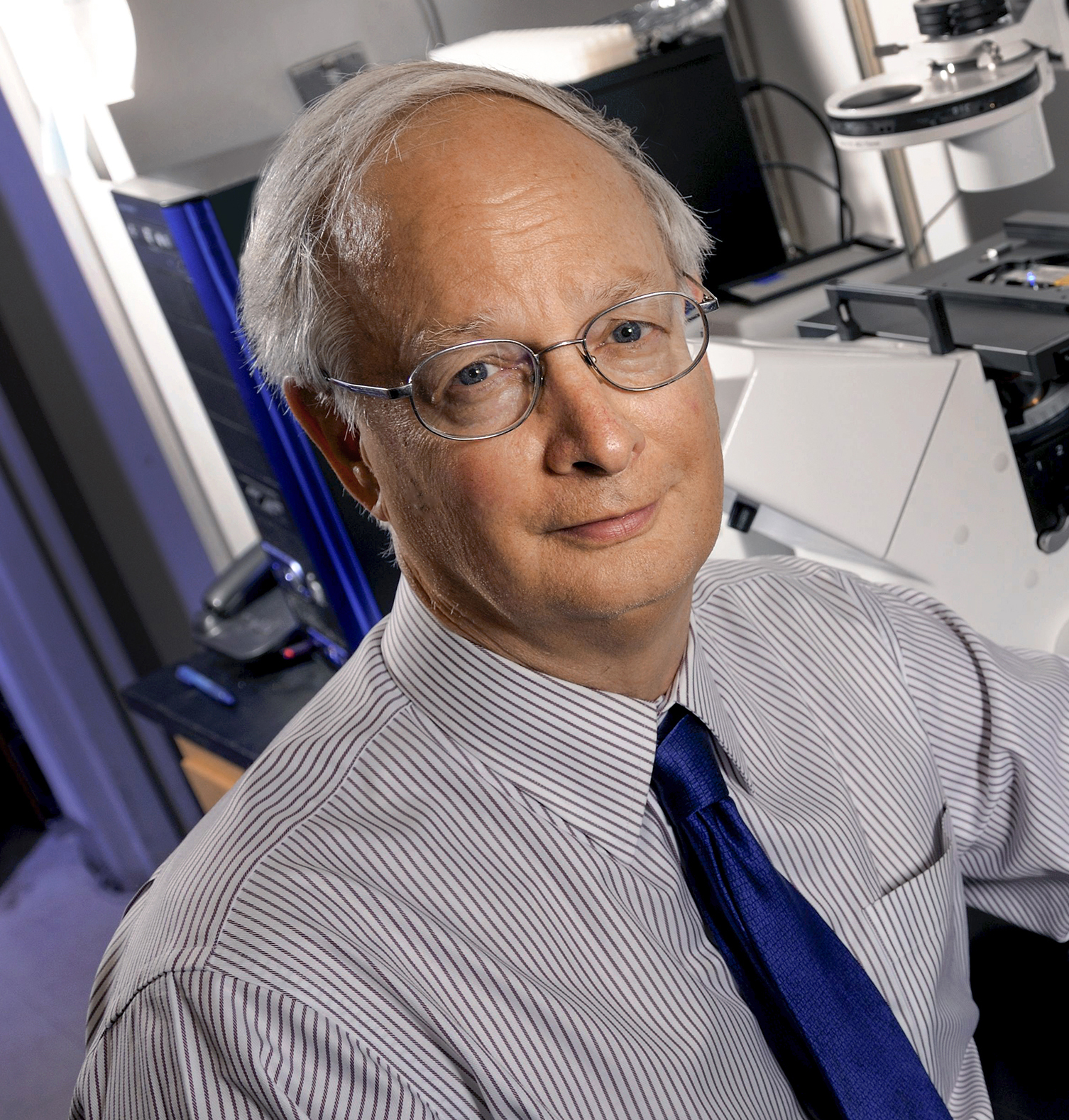
- Born: December 17, 1948 (age 77); Celina, Ohio, U.S.
- Education: Michigan State University; Stanford University
- Occupations: Pharmacologist; neurobiologist
- Known for: Glutamate receptor biology; neuroinflammation
- Children: 2, including Roger
- Medical career
- Field: Neuroscience, Neurology
- Institutions: Emory University School of Medicine

Raymond J Dingledine (born December 17, 1948) is an American pharmacologist and neurobiologist who has made contributions to the field of epilepsy. He serves as professor in the School of Medicine at Emory University, Atlanta, Georgia, where he chaired the pharmacology department for 25 years and served as executive associate dean of research for 10 years.

== Education ==
Dingledine grew up in St. Marys, Ohio, a small town bordering Grand Lake St. Marys. He graduated from Michigan State University with a B.S. in biochemistry in 1971, and from Stanford University with a PhD in pharmacology in 1975. His PhD training was under Avram Goldstein. He then did postdoctoral stints with John Kelly and Leslie Iversen in Cambridge UK, and Per Andersen in Oslo Norway. It was in Per’s lab, working with Leif Gjerstad and Iver Langmoen, that he developed a lifelong interest in epilepsy.

== Career ==
Dingledine joined the Department of Pharmacology at the University of North Carolina Chapel Hill in 1978 as an assistant professor, rising to full professor by 1989. Shortly after a sabbatical year at the Salk Institute in Steve Heinemann’s lab, he joined Emory University in 1992 as chair of the Department of Pharmacology, a job he held until 2017. He also served as executive associate dean of research in the school of medicine from 2004-2005 and 2008–2015.

He has served in professional science-intensive organizations throughout his career. He served on the program advisory committee of the Morehouse School of Medicine Neuroscience Institute from its inception in 1997 through 2021, chairing this committee for 14 years. He served the Society for Neuroscience in numerous functions, including treasurer in 2003 and, most recently, as chair of their investment committee for 15 years. At the American Epilepsy Society he chaired the Epilepsy Benchmark Stewards from 2017-2018. From 1995 to 2000, he served as editor-in-chief of Molecular Pharmacology, a major journal sponsored by the American Society for Pharmacology and Experimental Therapeutics. Dingledine co-founded two small pharma companies. NeurOp Inc was founded in 2003 and is currently a clinical-stage company focused on developing NMDA receptor modulators for cerebral ischemia, pain and depression. He serves on NeurOp's board of directors and scientific advisory Board. Pyrefin Inc was founded in 2019 to develop novel anti-inflammatory drugs to combat cognitive decline and post-operative pain; he chairs Pyrefin’s Board of Directors. He is an inventor of record for 12 awarded patents.

== Research and work ==
His early research focused on the modulation of glutamate receptor-mediated synaptic transmission. During this period he and his team discovered that glycine is a coagonist rather than modulator of NMDA receptors, that shrinkage of extracellular space mediates the transition between interictal and ictal states in the high potassium model of seizures, that a single amino acid residue controls calcium permeation in glutamate receptor channels, and that ifenprodil analogs inhibit NMDA receptors by increasing the sensitivity of receptors to proton inhibition. His current research focuses on the myriad roles of neuroinflammation in neurologic disorders. He demonstrated a profound role for EP2 receptor activation by prostaglandin E2 in COX-2 related pathologies. His work highlights the importance of neuroinflammation in epilepsy.

== Awards and honors ==
Dingledine was elected to the US National Academy of Medicine in 2010, the Norwegian Academy of Science and Letters in 2018, and the National Academy of Inventors in 2022. He was elected as a Fellow of the American Association for Advancement of Science in 2003, a Fellow of the American Society for Pharmacology and Experimental Therapeutics in 2020, and a Fellow of the American Epilepsy Society in 2024. His early career was profiled in Nature Medicine in 2002. He received the Bristol-Myers Squibb Neuroscience Award in 1989 and again in 1993, the epilepsy basic research award from the American Epilepsy Society in 1995, a Javits Neuroscience Award from the National Institute of Neurological Disorders and Stroke in 1998, the PhRMA Foundation Career Award in Excellence in 1999, the Robert R Ruffolo Career Achievement Award from the American Society of Pharmacology and Experimental Therapeutics in 2018., and the Julius Axelrod Prize from the Society for Neuroscience in 2023. Two endowed prizes have been established in his name, the Ray Dingledine Award for Extraordinary Graduate Achievement in 2018, and the Ray Dingledine award for research impact in 2020.

== Personal life ==
Dingledine is married to Sherry Edwards and has two sons, Brian and Roger.

== Publications ==
=== Selected papers ===
- Kleckner, NW; Dingledine, R (12 August 1988). "Requirement for glycine in activation of NMDA-receptors expressed in Xenopus oocytes". Science. 241 (4867): 835–7. Bibcode:1988Sci...241..835K. doi:10.1126/science.2841759. PMID 2841759.
- McBain, CJ; Traynelis, SF; Dingledine, R (10 August 1990). "Regional variation of extracellular space in the hippocampus". Science. 249 (4969): 674–7. Bibcode:1990Sci...249..674M. doi:10.1126/science.2382142. PMID 2382142.
- Bennett, JA; Dingledine, R (February 1995). "Topology profile for a glutamate receptor: three transmembrane domains and a channel-lining reentrant membrane loop". Neuron. 14 (2): 373–84. doi:10.1016/0896-6273(95)90293-7. PMID 7857646. S2CID 15620279.
- Laezza, F; Doherty, JJ; Dingledine, R (27 August 1999). "Long-term depression in hippocampal interneurons: joint requirement for pre- and postsynaptic events". Science. 285 (5432): 1411–4. doi:10.1126/science.285.5432.1411. PMID 10464102.
- Huang, Y; Myers, SJ; Dingledine, R (October 1999). "Transcriptional repression by REST: recruitment of Sin3A and histone deacetylase to neuronal genes". Nature Neuroscience. 2 (10): 867–72. doi:10.1038/13165. PMID 10491605. S2CID 25697585.
- Serrano, GE; Lelutiu, N; Rojas, A; Cochi, S; Shaw, R; Makinson, CD; Wang, D; FitzGerald, GA; Dingledine, R (19 October 2011). "Ablation of cyclooxygenase-2 in forebrain neurons is neuroprotective and dampens brain inflammation after status epilepticus". The Journal of Neuroscience. 31 (42): 14850–60. doi:10.1523/JNEUROSCI.3922-11.2011. PMC 4126152. PMID 22016518.
- Jiang, J; Quan, Y; Ganesh, T; Pouliot, WA; Dudek, FE; Dingledine, R (26 February 2013). "Inhibition of the prostaglandin receptor EP2 following status epilepticus reduces delayed mortality and brain inflammation". Proceedings of the National Academy of Sciences of the United States of America. 110 (9): 3591–6. Bibcode:2013PNAS..110.3591J. doi:10.1073/pnas.1218498110. PMC 3587237. PMID 23401547.
- Varvel, NH; Neher, JJ; Bosch, A; Wang, W; Ransohoff, RM; Miller, RJ; Dingledine, R (20 September 2016). "Infiltrating monocytes promote brain inflammation and exacerbate neuronal damage after status epilepticus". Proceedings of the National Academy of Sciences of the United States of America. 113 (38): E5665-74. Bibcode:2016PNAS..113E5665V. doi:10.1073/pnas.1604263113. PMC 5035862. PMID 27601660.
- Dingledine, R (September 2018). "Why Is It so Hard to Do Good Science?". eNeuro. 5 (5). doi:10.1523/ENEURO.0188-18.2018. PMC 6126587. PMID 30197928.
- Varvel, NH; Espinosa-Garcia, C; Hunter-Chang, S; Chen, D; Biegel, A; Hsieh, A; Blackmer-Raynolds, L; Ganesh, T; Dingledine, R (3 February 2021). "Peripheral Myeloid Cell EP2 Activation Contributes to the Deleterious Consequences of Status Epilepticus". The Journal of Neuroscience. 41 (5): 1105–1117. doi:10.1523/JNEUROSCI.2040-20.2020. PMC 7880294. PMID 33293358.
