= The Tor Project =

Free and open-source software project for enabling anonymous communication

The Tor Project, Inc.
- Formation: December 22, 2006
- Founders: Roger Dingledine; Nick Mathewson
- Type: 501(c)(3)
- Tax ID no.: 20-8096820
- Purpose: To advance human rights and freedoms by creating and deploying free and open source anonymity and privacy technologies, supporting their unrestricted availability and use, and furthering their scientific and popular understanding.
- Headquarters: Winchester, New Hampshire, U.S.
- Products: Tor; Tor Browser; Orbot; Snowflake; Tails
- Executive Director: Isabela Bagueros
- Revenue: $5,999,891 (2021)
- Expenses: $4,853,334 (2021)
- Website: torproject.org; 2gzyxa5ihm7nsggfxnu52rck2vv4rvmdlkiu3zzui5du4xyclen53wid.onion ^{(Accessing link help)}

The Tor Project, Inc. is a 501(c)(3) research-education nonprofit organization based in Winchester, Massachusetts. It is founded by computer scientists Roger Dingledine, Nick Mathewson, and five others. The Tor Project is primarily responsible for maintaining software for the Tor anonymity network.

== History ==
The Tor Project, Inc. was founded on December 22, 2006 by computer scientists Roger Dingledine, Nick Mathewson and five others. The Electronic Frontier Foundation (EFF) acted as the Tor Project's fiscal sponsor in its early years, and early financial supporters of the Tor Project included the U.S. International Broadcasting Bureau, Internews, Human Rights Watch, the University of Cambridge, Google, and Netherlands-based Stichting NLnet.

In October 2014, the Tor Project hired the public relations firm Thomson Communications in order to improve its public image (particularly regarding the terms "Dark Net" and "hidden services") and to educate journalists about the technical aspects of Tor.

In May 2015, the Tor Project ended the Tor Cloud Service.

In December 2015, the Tor Project announced that it had hired Shari Steele, former executive director of the Electronic Frontier Foundation, as its new executive director. Roger Dingledine, who had been acting as interim executive director since May 2015, remained at the Tor Project as a director and board member. Later that month, the Tor Project announced that the Open Technology Fund would be sponsoring a bug bounty program that was coordinated by HackerOne. The program was initially invite-only and focuses on finding vulnerabilities that are specific to the Tor Project's applications.

On May 25, 2016, Tor Project employee Jacob Appelbaum stepped down from his position; this was announced on June 2 in a two-line statement by Tor. Over the following days, allegations of sexual mistreatment were made public by several people.

On July 13, 2016, the complete board of the Tor Project – Meredith Hoban Dunn, Ian Goldberg, Julius Mittenzwei, Rabbi Rob Thomas, Wendy Seltzer, Roger Dingledine and Nick Mathewson – was replaced with Matt Blaze, Cindy Cohn, Gabriella Coleman, Linus Nordberg, Megan Price and Bruce Schneier. A new anti-harassment policy has been approved by the new board, as well as a conflicts of interest policy, procedures for submitting complaints, and an internal complaint review process. The affair continues to be controversial, with considerable dissent within the Tor community.

In 2020, due to the COVID-19 pandemic, the Tor project's core team let go of 13 employees, leaving a working staff of 22 people.

In 2023, the Tails Project approached the Tor Project to merge operations. The merger was completed on September 26, 2024, stating that, "By joining forces, the Tails team can now focus on their core mission of maintaining and improving Tails OS, exploring more and complementary use cases while benefiting from the larger organizational structure of The Tor Project."

== Funding ==
Tor Project Contributions: Fiscal Year 2023–2024
Source	Contribution	%
Government Sources (total)	$3.1 million	43%
United States government (total)	$2.6 million	35%
Swedish government (SIDA)	$0.5 million	8%
Corporations (total)	$1.6 million	22%
Mullvad	$1.4 million	19%
Other corporations (<1% each)	$0.2 million	2%
Private Foundations (total)	$1.4 million	19%
#StartSmall by Jack Dorsey	$1.0 million	14%
Zcash Foundation	$0.2 million	2%
Other foundations (<1% each)	$0.2 million	3%
Individual Contributions (total)	$1.1 million	15%
Total	$7.3 million	100%

Historically, the Tor Project was largely funded by the United States government, making up 80% of its $2 million budget in 2012. In more recent years, this share has declined, with 35% of its $7.3 million budget coming from U.S. government sources as of June 2024. Funding from the U.S. government has come from various departments and agencies, including the U.S. State Department (often via the DRL), the USAGM and its predecessor the Broadcasting Board of Governors (often via the Open Technology Fund), the National Science Foundation, and the U.S. Department of Defense (often via DARPA). According to Tor Project representatives, the project's funding from the Department of Defense is akin to research grants, rather than procurement contracts, and no collaboration has ever occurred to reveal the identities of users. Another source of government funding is the Swedish government, via the Swedish International Development Cooperation Agency (SIDA).

The Tor Project has also been the recipient of donations and grants from private foundations. Notable contributions have come from the private foundations of technology entrepreneurs Jack Dorsey and Craig Newmark. Other prominent private foundations to make contributions include the Ford Foundation, Open Society Foundations, the Alfred P. Sloan Foundation, and the Heising-Simons Foundation. Contributions have been made by technology non-profits, foundations, and companies as well, such as financial contributions from the Zcash Foundation, Mozilla, and NLnet, as well as resource contributions, such as the Google Summer of Code or file hosting services donated by Fastly.

In April 2023, the Tor Project announced a partnership where Tor Browser developers would create the Mullvad Browser. While all corporate contributions combined made up 3.4% of the Tor Project's 2021–2022 budget, as of 2024, Mullvad contributes 19% of the project's budget, making it the second largest single contributor (after the DRL).

A significant portion of the Tor Project's funding is from individual donors. Despite making up less than government and corporate funds, Tor Project places a high value on individual donations, as they are made without restrictions on what the funding may be used for, granting greater flexibility for project priorities. The project often frames donations in terms of a "Bug Smash Fund", as the donations are used to fix software bugs left outside the scope of other sources of funding.

== Tools ==
- Metrics Portal

Analytics for the Tor network, including graphs of its available bandwidth and estimated user-base. This is a great resource for researchers interested in detailed statistics about Tor.

- Nyx

a terminal (command line) application for monitoring and configuring Tor, intended for command-line enthusiasts and ssh connections. This functions much like top does for system usage, providing real time information on Tor's resource utilization and state.

- Onionoo

Web-based protocol to learn about currently running Tor relays and bridges.

- OnionShare

An open source tool that allows users to securely and anonymously share a file of any size.

- Open Observatory of Network Interference (OONI)

a global observation network, monitoring network censorship, which aims to collect high-quality data using open methodologies, using Free and Open Source Software (FL/OSS) to share observations and data about the various types, methods, and amounts of network tampering in the world.

- Orbot

Tor for Android and iOS devices, developed and maintained in collaboration with the Guardian Project.

- Orlib

a library for use by any Android application to route Internet traffic through Orbot/Tor.

- Pluggable Transports (PT)

helps circumvent censorship. Transforms the Tor traffic flow between the client and the bridge. This way, censors who monitor traffic between the client and the bridge will see innocent-looking transformed traffic instead of the actual Tor traffic.

- Relay Search

Site providing an overview of the Tor network.

- Shadow

a discrete-event network simulator that runs the real Tor software as a plug-in. Shadow is open-source software that enables accurate, efficient, controlled, and repeatable Tor experimentation.

- Stem

Python Library for writing scripts and applications that interact with Tor.

- Tails (The Amnesic Incognito Live System)

a live CD/USB distribution pre-configured so that everything is safely routed through Tor and leaves no trace on the local system.

- Tor

free software and an open network that helps a user defend against traffic analysis, a form of network surveillance that threatens personal freedom and privacy, confidential business activities and relationships, and state security. The organization has also implemented the software in Rust named Arti.

- Tor Browser

a customization of Mozilla Firefox which uses a Tor circuit for browsing anonymously and with other features consistent with the Tor mission.

- Tor Phone

A phone that routes its network traffic through the Tor network. Now defunct.

- TorBirdy

Extension for Thunderbird and related *bird forks to route connections through the Tor network.

- txtorcon

Python and Twisted event-based implementation of the Tor control protocol. Unit-tests, state and configuration abstractions, documentation. It is available on PyPI and in Debian.

== Recognition ==
In March 2011, the Tor Project received the Free Software Foundation's 2010 Award for Projects of Social Benefit. The citation read, "Using free software, Tor has enabled roughly 36 million people around the world to experience freedom of access and expression on the Internet while keeping them in control of their privacy and anonymity. Its network has proved pivotal in dissident movements in both Iran and more recently Egypt."

In September 2012, the Tor Project received the 2012 EFF Pioneer Award, along with Jérémie Zimmermann and Andrew Huang.

In November 2012, Foreign Policy magazine named Dingledine, Mathewson, and Syverson among its Top 100 Global Thinkers "for making the web safe for whistleblowers".

In 2014, Roger Dingledine, Nick Mathewson and Paul Syverson received the USENIX Test of Time Award for their paper titled "Tor: The Second-Generation Onion Router", which was published in the Proceedings of the 13th USENIX Security Symposium, August 2004.

In 2021, the Tor Project was awarded the Levchin Prize for real-world cryptography.

== See also ==
- Privacy software
