= Roger Dingledine =

American computer scientist

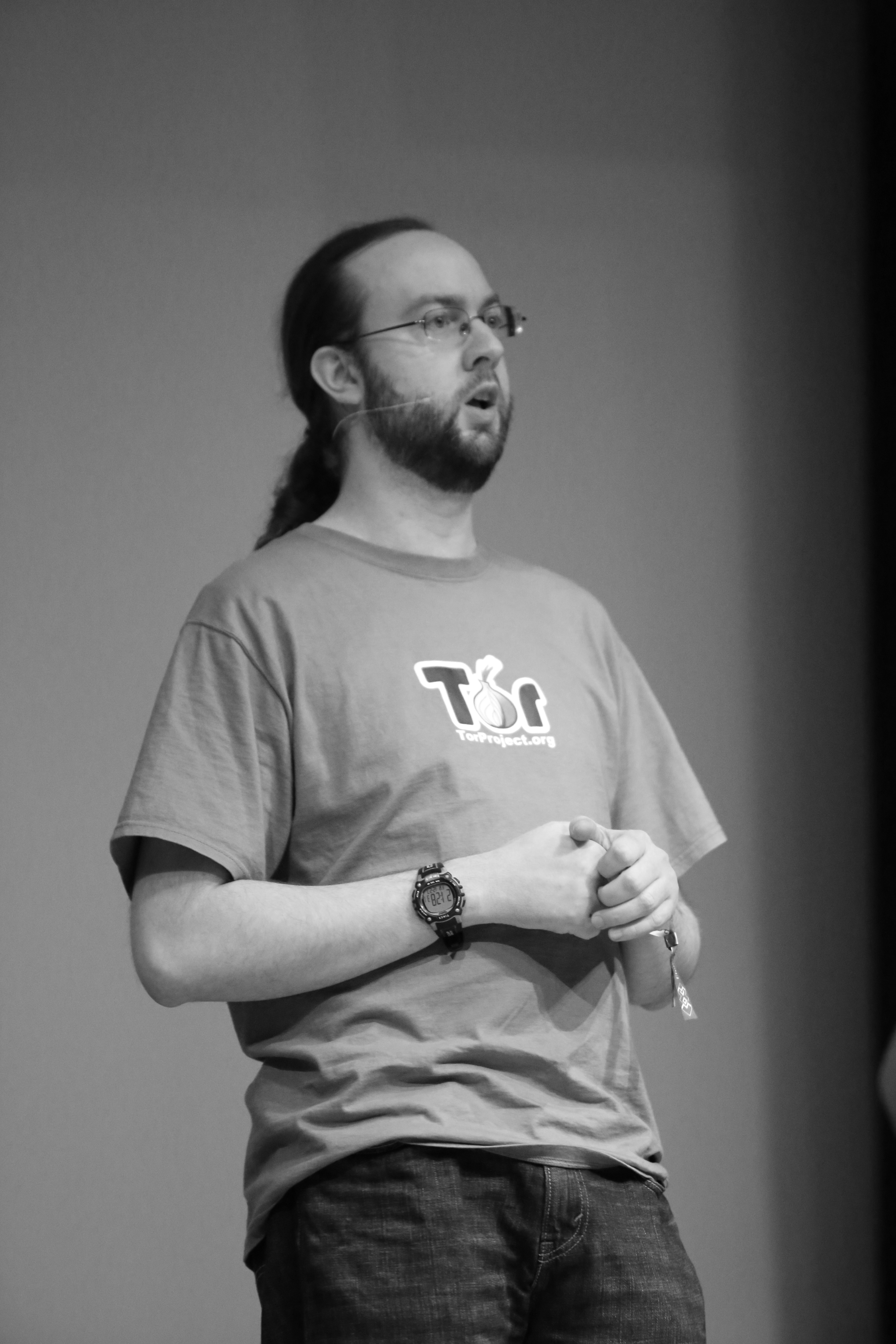
- Dingledine in 2013
- Born: Roger Dingledine; United States
- Other name: arma
- Occupations: Director and Research Director, the Tor Project
- Known for: Co-Founding Tor and the Tor Project
- Father: Raymond Dingledine

Roger Dingledine is an American computer scientist who co-founded the Tor Project. An MIT graduate in mathematics, computer science, and electrical engineering, Dingledine is also known by the pseudonym arma. As of December 2016, he is Project Leader, Director, and Research Director at the Tor Project.

== Education ==
Dingledine graduated from MIT with Bachelor of Science degrees in Mathematics and Computer Science and Engineering in 2000. He later obtained a Master of Engineering in Electrical Engineering and Computer Science from MIT.

== Career ==
=== Tor Project ===
Tor was developed by Dingledine—with Nick Mathewson and Paul Syverson—under a contract from the United States Naval Research Laboratory.As of 2006, the software they developed was being distributed using proceeds from the Electronic Frontier Foundation, by the Tor Project. As described at the end of 2015,

The Tor Project develops and maintains ... The Tor Browser system, also known as The Onion Router ... a free, open source and sophisticated privacy tool that provides anonymity for web surfing and communication

as well as developing and maintaining other software tools and applications.

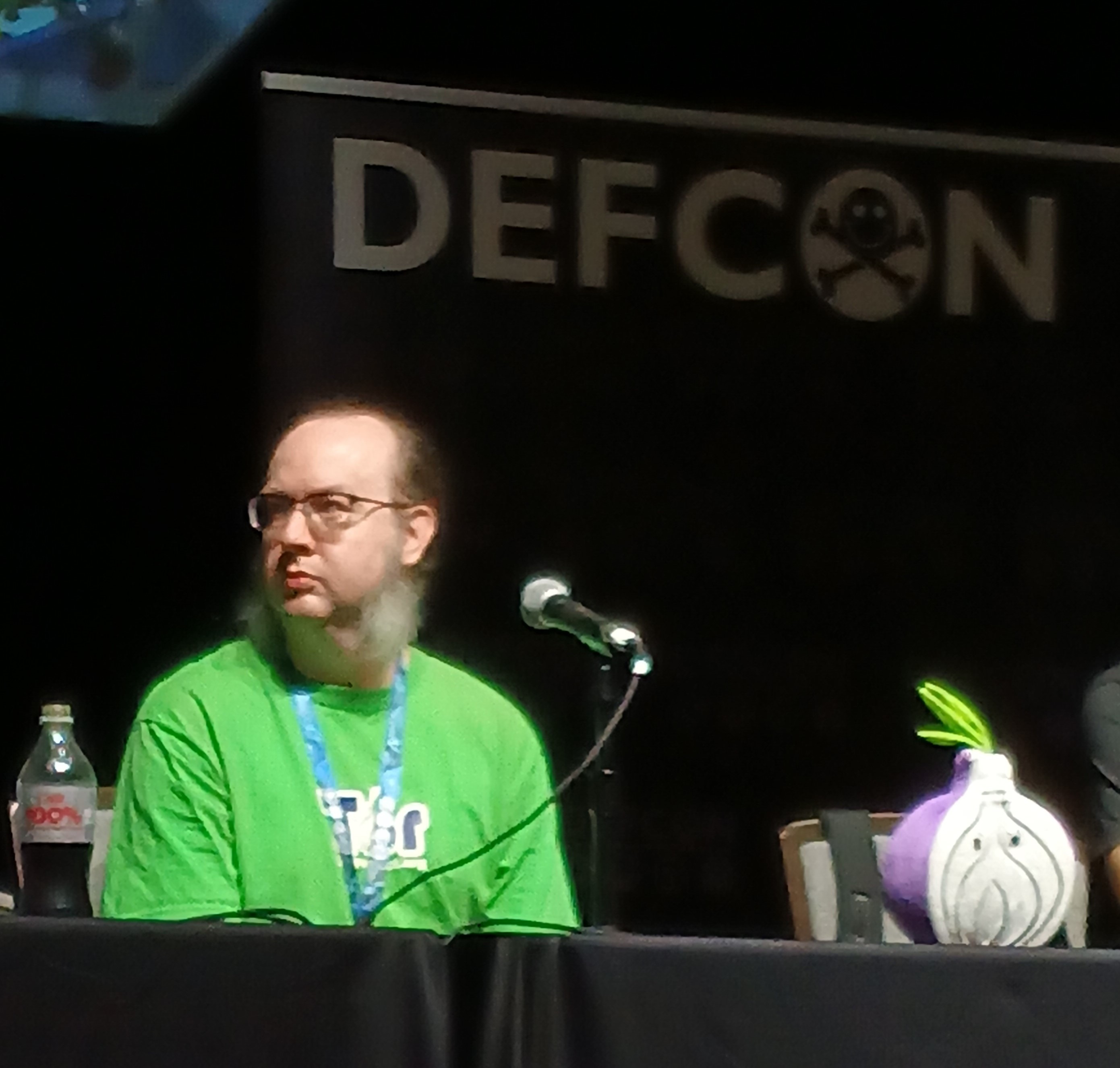
Dingledine at a panel discussion during DEFCON 2023

== Publications and presentations ==
Dingledine has written several highly cited papers, including the Tor design paper titled Tor: The Second-Generation Onion Router, which won the Usenix Security "Test of Time" award. Other highly cited papers include Mixminion’s protocols for anonymous email, the Free Haven Project distributed anonymous storage service, various attacks and vulnerabilities related to anonymity technologies, and the economics and network effects of technologies for anonymity.

As an advocate for strong privacy, Dingledine is frequently invited to speak about security and privacy, including at academic conferences, the NSF (2014), the NSA (2007), and periodic interviews.

== Awards and honors ==
Dingledine was named as one of the 2006 thirty-five Innovators Under 35 by MIT Technology Review, for his work on internet anonymization technologies through the Tor Project. The Review described the importance of the work in this way:

A dissident in China uses Web-based e-mail to contact a journalist in Canada. An intelligence agency wants to surveil a foreign website. Like every operation on the Internet, these activities leave tracks. Online anonymity measures provide a way around this problem; one of the most advanced is Tor, or the Onion Router. / Computer scientist Roger Dingledine developed Tor ...

In 2012, Dingledine and the other two initial developers of Tor, Nick Mathewson and Paul Syverson, were recognized by Foreign Policy magazine as #78 in their top 100 global thinkers.

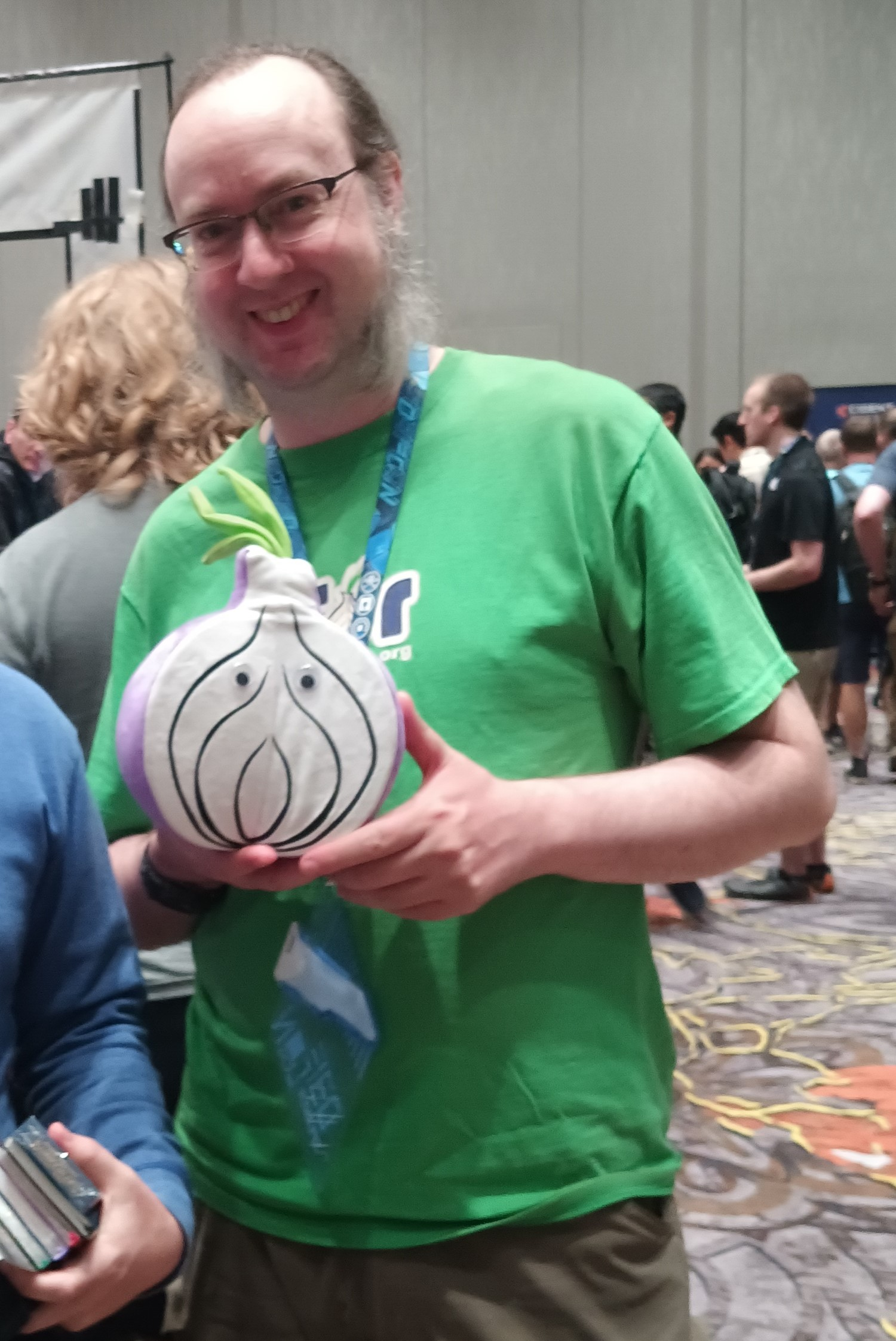
Dingledine in 2023

== Media attention ==
Dingledine has drawn attention after the leak of NSA documents by Edward Snowden, and public disclosure of the rules guiding the operation of XKeyscore, the NSA's collection system, given XKeyscore's targeting of Tor Project onion servers, including the one Dingledine runs at MIT, which serves a directory authority for the system, as well as being the base of operation of the Mixminion mail service, and host to various gaming and other websites (from which the NSA might be collecting IP addresses).
