= Tor (network) =

Free and open-source anonymity network based on onion routing

- The Tor Project logo
- Developer: The Tor Project
- Release: 20 September 2002; 24 years ago

Stable release(s) [±]
- 0.4.9.17 (13 November 2026; 7 days ago) s

Preview release(s) [±]
- Written in: C, Python, Rust
- Operating system: Unix-like, (Android, Linux, BSD, macOS, iOS), Microsoft Windows
- Size: 150–231 MB
- Available in: English
- Type: Overlay network, mix network, onion router, Anonymity application
- License: BSD 3-clause license
- Website: torproject.org
- Repository: gitlab.torproject.org/tpo/core/tor/

Tor is a free overlay network for enabling anonymous communication. It is built on free and open-source software run by over seven thousand volunteer-operated relays worldwide, as well as by millions of users who route their internet traffic via random paths through these relays. This technique is called onion routing.

Using Tor makes it more difficult to trace a user's internet activity by preventing any single point on the internet (other than the user's device) from being able to view both where traffic originated from and where it is ultimately going to at the same time. This conceals a user's location and usage from anyone performing network surveillance or traffic analysis from any such point, protecting the user's freedom and ability to communicate confidentially.

== History ==
The core principle of Tor, known as onion routing, was developed in the mid-1990s by United States Naval Research Laboratory employees, mathematician Paul Syverson, and computer scientists Michael G. Reed and David Goldschlag, to protect American intelligence communications online. Onion routing is implemented by means of encryption in the application layer of the communication protocol stack, nested like the layers of an onion. The alpha version of Tor, developed by Syverson and computer scientists Roger Dingledine and Nick Mathewson and then called The Onion Routing project (which was later given the acronym "Tor"), was launched on 20 September 2002. The first public release occurred a year later.

In 2004, the Naval Research Laboratory released the code for Tor under a free license, and the Electronic Frontier Foundation (EFF) began funding Dingledine and Mathewson to continue its development. In 2006, Dingledine, Mathewson, and five others founded The Tor Project, a Massachusetts-based 501(c)(3) research-education nonprofit organization responsible for maintaining Tor. The EFF acted as The Tor Project's fiscal sponsor in its early years, and early financial supporters included the U.S. Bureau of Democracy, Human Rights, and Labor and International Broadcasting Bureau, Internews, Human Rights Watch, the University of Cambridge, Google, and Netherlands-based Stichting NLnet.

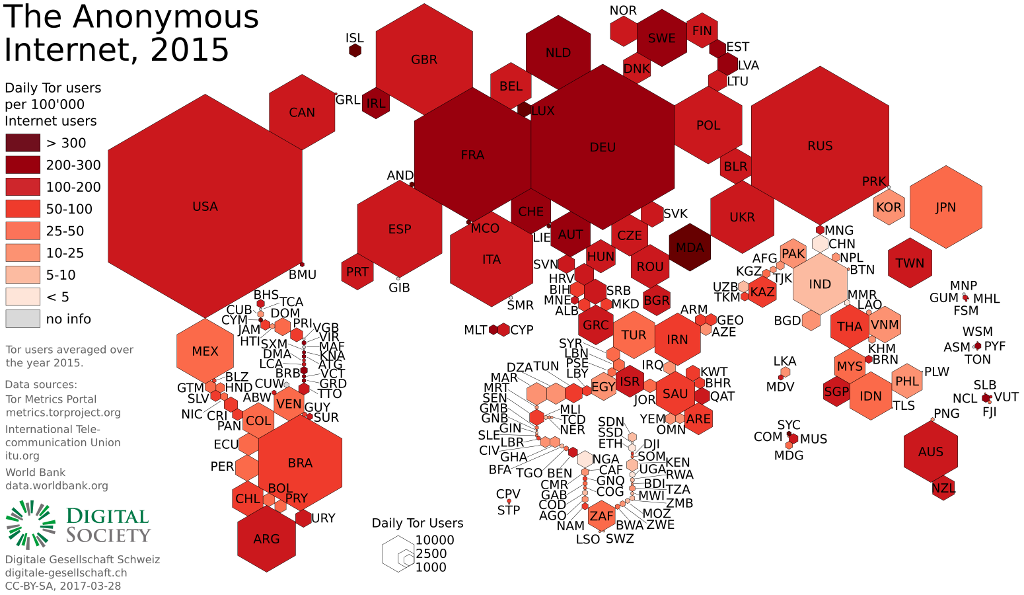
A cartogram illustrating Tor usage in 2015

Over the course of its existence, various Tor vulnerabilities have been discovered and occasionally exploited. Attacks against Tor are an active area of academic research that is welcomed by The Tor Project itself.

== Usage ==
Web-based onion services in February 2016
Category	% of total	% of active
Violence	0.3	0.6
Arms	0.8	1.5
Illicit Social	1.2	2.4
Hacking	1.8	3.5
Illicit links	2.3	4.3
Illicit pornography	2.3	4.5
Extremism	2.7	5.1
Illicit Other	3.8	7.3
Illicit Finance	6.3	12
Illicit Drugs	8.1	15.5
Non-illicit+Unknown	22.6	43.2
Illicit total	29.7	56.8
Inactive	47.7
Active	52.3

Tor enables its users to surf the Internet, chat and send instant messages anonymously, and is used by a wide variety of people for both licit and illicit purposes. Tor has, for example, been used by criminal enterprises, hacktivism groups, and law enforcement agencies at cross purposes, sometimes simultaneously; likewise, agencies within the U.S. government variously fund Tor (the U.S. State Department, the National Science Foundation, and – through the Broadcasting Board of Governors, which itself partially funded Tor until October 2012 – Radio Free Asia) and seek to subvert it. Tor was one of a dozen circumvention tools evaluated by a Freedom House-funded report based on user experience from China in 2010, which include Ultrasurf, Hotspot Shield, and Freegate.

Tor is not meant to completely solve the issue of anonymity on the web. Tor is not designed to completely erase tracking but instead to reduce the likelihood for sites to trace actions and data back to the user.

Tor can also be used for illegal activities. These can include censorship circumvention, as well as distribution of child abuse content, drug sales, or malware distribution.

Tor has been described by The Economist, in relation to Bitcoin and Silk Road, as being "a dark corner of the web". It has been targeted by the American National Security Agency and the British GCHQ signals intelligence agencies, albeit with marginal success, and more successfully by the British National Crime Agency in its Operation Notarise. At the same time, GCHQ has been using a tool named "Shadowcat" for "end-to-end encrypted access to VPS over SSH using the Tor network". Tor can be used for anonymous defamation, unauthorized news leaks of sensitive information, copyright infringement, distribution of illegal sexual content, selling controlled substances, weapons, and stolen credit card numbers, money laundering, bank fraud, credit card fraud, identity theft and the exchange of counterfeit currency; the black market utilizes the Tor infrastructure, at least in part, in conjunction with Bitcoin. It has also been used to brick IoT devices.

In its complaint against Ross William Ulbricht of Silk Road, the US Federal Bureau of Investigation acknowledged that Tor has "known legitimate uses". According to CNET, Tor's anonymity function is "endorsed by the Electronic Frontier Foundation (EFF) and other civil liberties groups as a method for whistleblowers and human rights workers to communicate with journalists". EFF's Surveillance Self-Defense guide includes a description of where Tor fits in a larger strategy for protecting privacy and anonymity.

In 2014, the EFF's Eva Galperin told Businessweek that "Tor's biggest problem is press. No one hears about that time someone wasn't stalked by their abuser. They hear how somebody got away with downloading child porn."

The Tor Project states that Tor users include "normal people" who wish to keep their Internet activities private from websites and advertisers, people concerned about cyber-spying, and users who are evading censorship such as activists, journalists, and military professionals. In November 2013, Tor had about four million users. According to the Wall Street Journal, in 2012 about 14% of Tor's traffic connected from the United States, with people in "Internet-censoring countries" as its second-largest user base. Tor is increasingly used by victims of domestic violence and the social workers and agencies that assist them, even though shelter workers may or may not have had professional training on cyber-security matters. Properly deployed, however, it precludes digital stalking, which has increased due to the prevalence of digital media in contemporary online life. Along with SecureDrop, Tor is used by news organizations such as The Guardian, The New Yorker, ProPublica and The Intercept to protect the privacy of whistleblowers.

In March 2015, the Parliamentary Office of Science and Technology released a briefing which stated that "There is widespread agreement that banning online anonymity systems altogether is not seen as an acceptable policy option in the U.K." and that "Even if it were, there would be technical challenges." The report further noted that Tor "plays only a minor role in the online viewing and distribution of indecent images of children" (due in part to its inherent latency); its usage by the Internet Watch Foundation, the utility of its onion services for whistleblowers, and its circumvention of the Great Firewall of China were touted.

Tor's executive director, Andrew Lewman, also said in August 2014 that agents of the NSA and the GCHQ have anonymously provided Tor with bug reports.

The Tor Project's FAQ offers supporting reasons for the EFF's endorsement:

Criminals can already do bad things. Since they're willing to break laws, they already have lots of options available that provide better privacy than Tor provides...

Tor aims to provide protection for ordinary people who want to follow the law. Only criminals have privacy right now, and we need to fix that...

So yes, criminals could in theory use Tor, but they already have better options, and it seems unlikely that taking Tor away from the world will stop them from doing their bad things. At the same time, Tor and other privacy measures can fight identity theft, physical crimes like stalking, and so on.

— Tor Project FAQ

== Operation ==
The high-level design of Tor. Tor protects client anonymity by nesting layers of encryption over three proxy hops, known as relays, or onion routers: a guard relay, followed by a middle relay, then an exit relay. Nodes running Tor are here represented as onions.

Tor aims to conceal its users' identities and their online activity from surveillance and traffic analysis by separating identification and routing. It is an implementation of onion routing, which encrypts and then randomly bounces communications through a network of relays run by volunteers around the globe. These onion routers employ encryption in a multi-layered manner (hence the onion metaphor) to ensure perfect forward secrecy between relays, thereby providing users with anonymity in a network location. That anonymity extends to the hosting of censorship-resistant content by Tor's anonymous onion service feature. Furthermore, by keeping some of the entry relays (bridge relays) secret, users can evade Internet censorship that relies upon blocking public Tor relays.

Because the IP address of the sender and the recipient are not both in cleartext at any hop along the way, anyone eavesdropping at any point along the communication channel cannot directly identify both ends. Furthermore, to the recipient, it appears that the last Tor node (called the exit node), rather than the sender, is the originator of the communication.

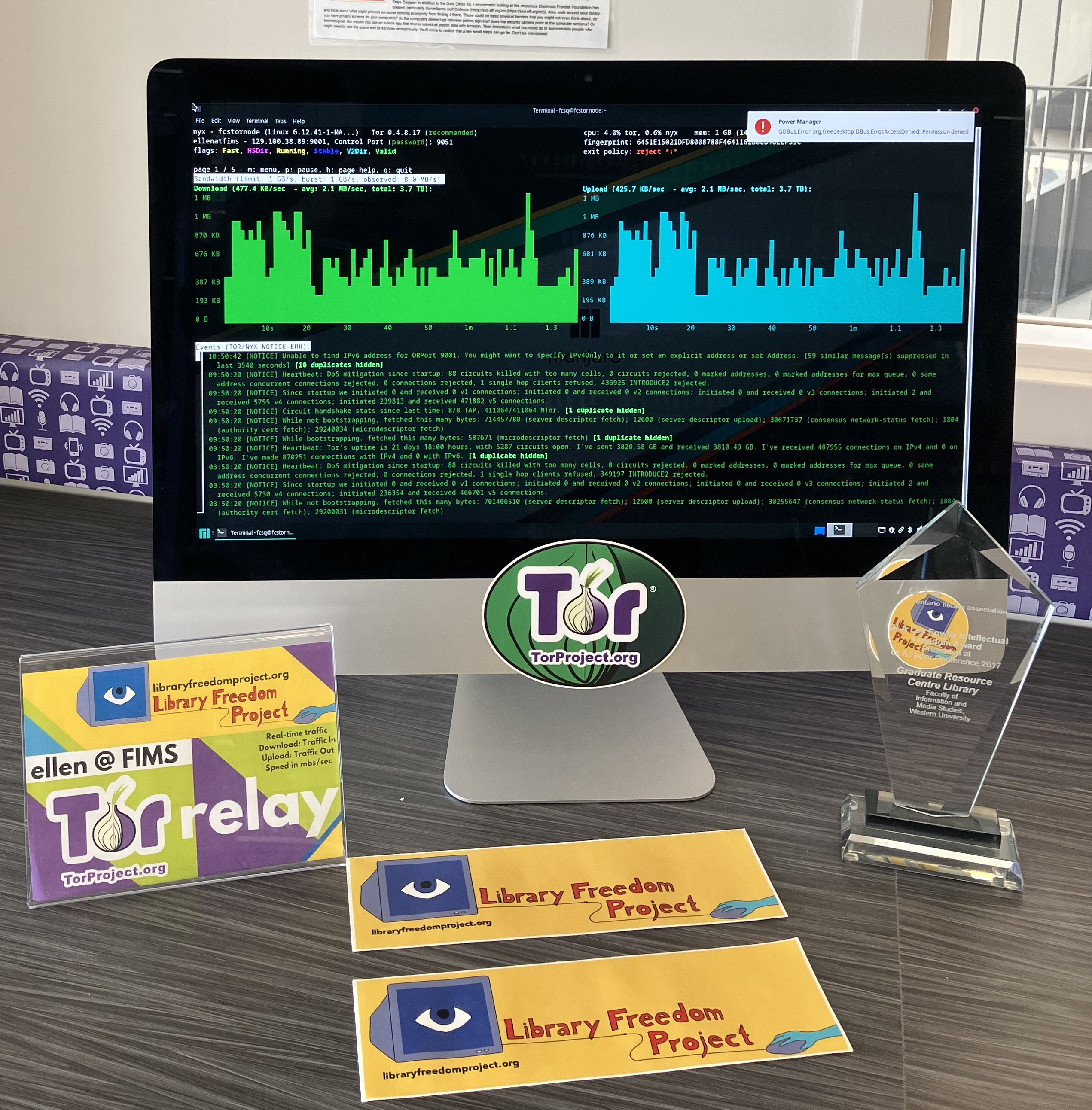
An onion router in Canada

=== Originating traffic ===
A Tor user's SOCKS-aware applications can be configured to direct their network traffic through a Tor instance's SOCKS interface, which is listening on TCP port 9050 (for standalone Tor) or 9150 (for Tor Browser bundle) at localhost. Tor periodically creates virtual circuits through the Tor network through which it can multiplex and onion-route that traffic to its destination. Once inside a Tor network, the traffic is sent from router to router along the circuit, ultimately reaching an exit node at which point the original (potentially cleartext) packet is available and is forwarded on to its original destination. Viewed from the destination, the traffic appears to originate at the Tor exit node.

Tor's application independence sets it apart from most other anonymity networks: it works at the Transmission Control Protocol (TCP) stream level. Applications whose traffic is commonly anonymized using Tor include Internet Relay Chat (IRC), instant messaging, and World Wide Web browsing.

=== Onion services ===
The high-level design of onion services. The client and onion service each select three relays (a guard and two middle relays) to route traffic to each other, never leaving the Tor network, and never transmitting plaintext.

Tor can also provide anonymity to websites and other servers. Servers configured to receive inbound connections by connecting to Tor are called onion services (formerly, hidden services). Rather than revealing a server's IP address (and thus its network location), an onion service is accessed through its onion address, usually via the Tor Browser or some other software designed to use Tor. The Tor network understands these addresses by looking up their corresponding public keys and introduction points from a distributed hash table within the network. It can route data to and from onion services, even those hosted behind firewalls or network address translators (NAT), while preserving the anonymity of both parties. Tor is necessary to access these onion services. Because the connection never leaves the Tor network, and is handled by the Tor application on both ends, the connection is always end-to-end encrypted.

Onion services were first specified in 2003 and have been deployed on the Tor network since 2004. They are unlisted by design, and can only be discovered on the network if the onion address is already known, though a number of sites and services do catalog publicly known onion addresses. Popular sources of .onion links include Pastebin, Twitter, Reddit, other Internet forums, and tailored search engines.

While onion services are often discussed in terms of websites, they can be used for any TCP service, and are commonly used for increased security or easier routing to non-web services, such as secure shell remote login, chat services such as IRC and XMPP, or file sharing. They have also become a popular means of establishing peer-to-peer connections in messaging and file sharing applications. Web-based onion services can be accessed from a standard web browser without client-side connection to the Tor network using services like Tor2web, which remove client anonymity.

In 2023, the Tor Project unveiled a new defense mechanism to safeguard onion services against denial-of-service (DoS) attacks. With the release of Tor 0.4.8, this proof-of-work (PoW) defense promises to prioritize legitimate network traffic while deterring malicious attacks.

== Attacks and limitations ==
Like all software with an attack surface, Tor's protections have limitations, and Tor's implementation or design have been vulnerable to attacks at various points throughout its history. While most of these limitations and attacks are minor, either being fixed without incident or proving inconsequential, others are more notable.

=== End-to-end traffic correlation ===
Tor is designed to provide relatively high performance network anonymity against an attacker with a single vantage point on the connection (e.g., control over one of the three relays, the destination server, or the user's internet service provider). Like all current low-latency anonymity networks, Tor cannot and does not attempt to protect against an attacker performing simultaneous monitoring of traffic at the boundaries of the Tor network—i.e., the traffic entering and exiting the network. While Tor does provide protection against traffic analysis, it cannot prevent traffic confirmation via end-to-end correlation.

There are no documented cases of this limitation being used at scale; as of the 2013 Snowden leaks, law enforcement agencies such as the NSA were unable to perform dragnet surveillance on Tor itself, and relied on attacking other software used in conjunction with Tor, such as vulnerabilities in web browsers. However, targeted attacks have been able to make use of traffic confirmation on individual Tor users, via police surveillance or investigations confirming that a particular person already under suspicion was sending Tor traffic at the exact times the connections in question occurred. The relay early traffic confirmation attack also relied on traffic confirmation as part of its mechanism, though on requests for onion service descriptors, rather than traffic to the destination server.

=== Consensus attacks ===
Like many decentralized systems, Tor relies on a consensus mechanism to periodically update its current operating parameters. For Tor, these include network parameters like which nodes are good and bad relays, exits, guards, and how much traffic each can handle. Tor's architecture for deciding the consensus relies on a small number of directory authority nodes voting on current network parameters. Currently, there are nine directory authority nodes, and their health is publicly monitored. The IP addresses of the authority nodes are hard coded into each Tor client. The authority nodes vote every hour to update the consensus, and clients download the most recent consensus on startup. A compromise of the majority of the directory authorities could alter the consensus in a way that is beneficial to an attacker. Alternatively, a network congestion attack, such as a DDoS, could theoretically prevent the consensus nodes from communicating, and thus prevent voting to update the consensus (though such an attack would be visible).

=== Server-side restrictions ===
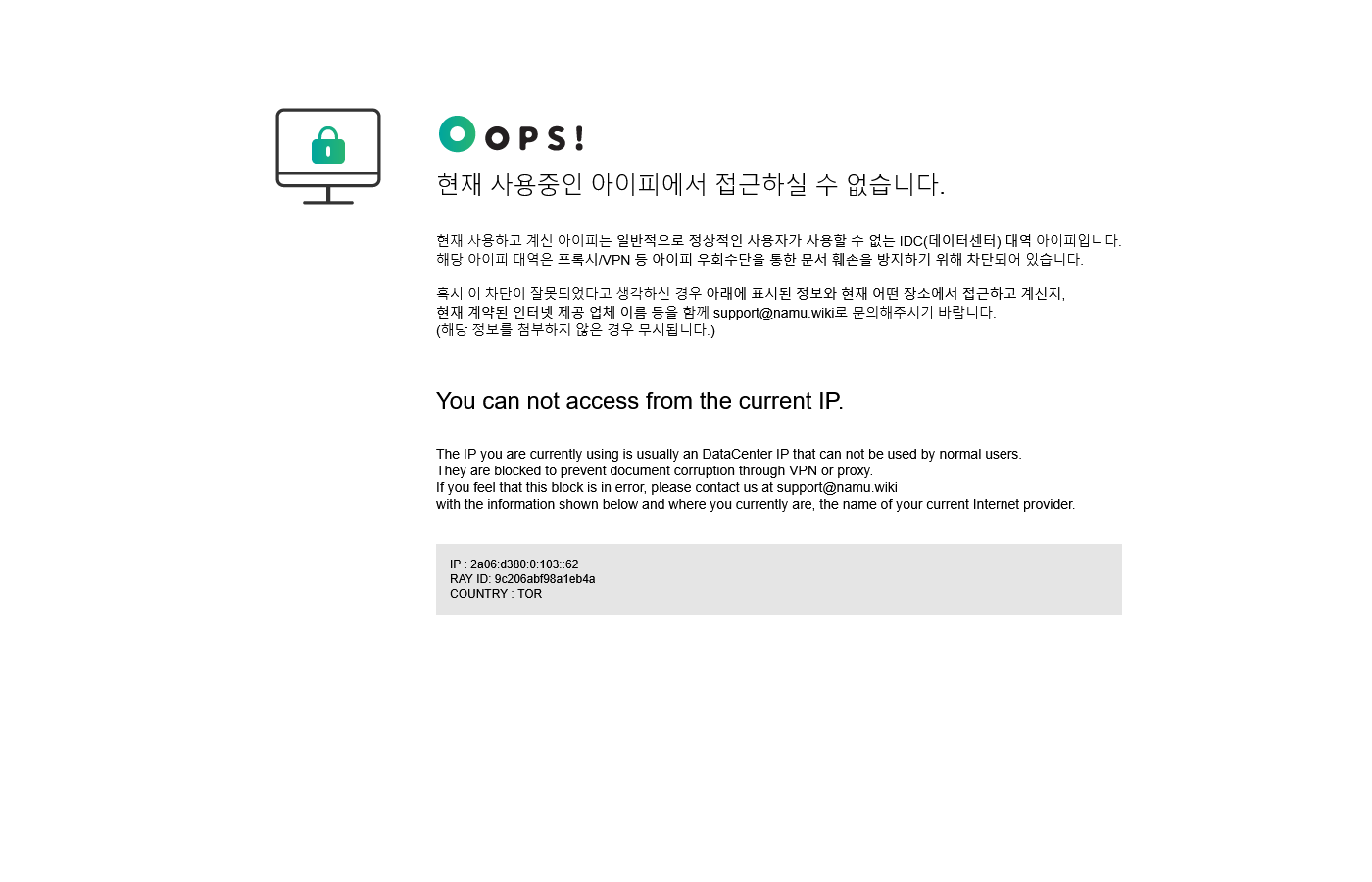
Screenshot of Namuwiki, notifying that the website is blocking Tor traffic

Tor makes no attempt to conceal the IP addresses of exit relays, or hide from a destination server the fact that a user is connecting via Tor. Operators of Internet sites therefore have the ability to prevent traffic from Tor exit nodes or to offer reduced functionality for Tor users. For example, Wikipedia generally forbids all editing when using Tor or when using an IP address also used by a Tor exit node, and the BBC blocks the IP addresses of all known Tor exit nodes from its iPlayer service.

Apart from intentional restrictions of Tor traffic, Tor use can trigger defense mechanisms on websites intended to block traffic from IP addresses observed to generate malicious or abnormal traffic. Because traffic from all Tor users is shared by a comparatively small number of exit relays, tools can misidentify distinct sessions as originating from the same user, and attribute the actions of a malicious user to a non-malicious user, or observe an unusually large volume of traffic for one IP address. Conversely, a site may observe a single session connecting from different exit relays, with different Internet geolocations, and assume the connection is malicious, or trigger geo-blocking. When these defense mechanisms are triggered, it can result in the site blocking access, or presenting captchas to the user.

=== Relay early traffic confirmation attack ===
In July 2014, the Tor Project issued a security advisory for a "relay early traffic confirmation" attack, disclosing the discovery of a group of relays attempting to de-anonymize onion service users and operators. A set of onion service directory nodes (i.e., the Tor relays responsible for providing information about onion services) were found to be modifying traffic of requests. The modifications made it so the requesting client's guard relay, if controlled by the same adversary as the onion service directory node, could easily confirm that the traffic was from the same request. This would allow the adversary to simultaneously know the onion service involved in the request, and the IP address of the client requesting it (where the requesting client could be a visitor or owner of the onion service).

The attacking nodes joined the network on 30 January, using a Sybil attack to comprise 6.4% of guard relay capacity, and were removed on 4 July. In addition to removing the attacking relays, the Tor application was patched to prevent the specific traffic modifications that made the attack possible.

In November 2014, there was speculation in the aftermath of Operation Onymous, resulting in 17 arrests internationally, that a Tor weakness had been exploited. A representative of Europol was secretive about the method used, saying: "This is something we want to keep for ourselves. The way we do this, we can't share with the whole world, because we want to do it again and again and again." A BBC source cited a "technical breakthrough" that allowed tracking physical locations of servers, and the initial number of infiltrated sites led to the exploit speculation. A Tor Project representative downplayed this possibility, suggesting that execution of more traditional police work was more likely.

In November 2015, court documents suggested a connection between the attack and arrests, and raised concerns about security research ethics. The documents revealed that the FBI obtained IP addresses of onion services and their visitors from a "university-based research institute", leading to arrests. Reporting from Motherboard found that the timing and nature of the relay early traffic confirmation attack matched the description in the court documents. Multiple experts, including a senior researcher with the ICSI of UC Berkeley, Edward Felten of Princeton University, and the Tor Project agreed that the CERT Coordination Center of Carnegie Mellon University was the institute in question. Concerns raised included the role of an academic institution in policing, sensitive research involving non-consenting users, the non-targeted nature of the attack, and the lack of disclosure about the incident.

=== Vulnerable applications ===
Many attacks targeted at Tor users result from flaws in applications used with Tor, either in the application itself, or in how it operates in combination with Tor. E.g., researchers with Inria in 2011 performed an attack on BitTorrent users by attacking clients that established connections both using and not using Tor, then associating other connections shared by the same Tor circuit.

==== Fingerprinting ====
When using Tor, applications may still provide data tied to a device, such as information about screen resolution, installed fonts, language configuration, or supported graphics functionality, reducing the set of users a connection could possibly originate from, or uniquely identifying them. This information is known as the device fingerprint, or browser fingerprint in the case of web browsers. Applications implemented with Tor in mind, such as Tor Browser, can be designed to minimize the amount of information leaked by the application and reduce its fingerprint.

==== Eavesdropping ====
Tor cannot encrypt the traffic between an exit relay and the destination server. If an application does not add an additional layer of end-to-end encryption between the client and the server, such as Transport Layer Security (TLS, used in HTTPS) or the Secure Shell (SSH) protocol, this allows the exit relay to capture and modify traffic. Attacks from malicious exit relays have recorded usernames and passwords, and modified Bitcoin addresses to redirect transactions.

Some of these attacks involved actively removing the HTTPS protections that would have otherwise been used. To attempt to prevent this, Tor Browser has since made it so only connections via onion services or HTTPS are allowed by default.

==== Firefox/Tor browser attacks ====
In 2011, the Dutch authority investigating child pornography discovered the IP address of a Tor onion service site from an unprotected administrator's account and gave it to the FBI, who traced it to Aaron McGrath. After a year of surveillance, the FBI launched "Operation Torpedo" which resulted in McGrath's arrest and allowed them to install their Network Investigative Technique (NIT) malware on the servers for retrieving information from the users of the three onion service sites that McGrath controlled. The technique exploited a vulnerability in Firefox/Tor Browser that had already been patched, and therefore targeted users that had not updated. A Flash application sent a user's IP address directly back to an FBI server, and resulted in revealing at least 25 US users as well as numerous users from other countries. McGrath was sentenced to 20 years in prison in early 2014, while at least 18 others (including a former Acting HHS Cyber Security Director) were sentenced in subsequent cases.

In August 2013, it was discovered that the Firefox browsers in many older versions of the Tor Browser Bundle were vulnerable to a JavaScript-deployed shellcode attack, as NoScript was not enabled by default. Attackers used this vulnerability to extract users' MAC and IP addresses and Windows computer names. News reports linked this to an FBI operation targeting Freedom Hosting's owner, Eric Eoin Marques, who was arrested on a provisional extradition warrant issued by a United States' court on 29 July. The FBI extradited Marques from Ireland to the state of Maryland on 4 charges: distributing; conspiring to distribute; and advertising child pornography, as well as aiding and abetting advertising of child pornography. The FBI acknowledged the attack in a 12 September 2013 court filing in Dublin; further technical details from a training presentation leaked by Edward Snowden revealed the code name for the exploit as "EgotisticalGiraffe".

In 2022, Kaspersky researchers found that when looking up "Tor Browser" in Chinese on YouTube, one of the URLs provided under the top-ranked Chinese-language video actually pointed to malware disguised as Tor Browser. Once installed, it saved browsing history and form data that genuine Tor forgot by default, and downloaded malicious components if the device's IP addresses was in China. Kaspersky researchers noted that the malware was not stealing data to sell for profit, but was designed to identify users.

==== Onion service configuration ====
Like client applications that use Tor, servers relying on onion services for protection can introduce their own weaknesses. Servers that are reachable through Tor onion services and the public Internet can be subject to correlation attacks, and all onion services are susceptible to misconfigured services (e.g., identifying information included by default in web server error responses), leaking uptime and downtime statistics, intersection attacks, or various user errors. The OnionScan program, written by independent security researcher Sarah Jamie Lewis, comprehensively examines onion services for such flaws and vulnerabilities.

== Software ==
The main implementation of Tor is written primarily in C. Starting in 2020, the Tor Project began development of a full rewrite of the C Tor codebase in Rust. The project, named Arti, was publicly announced in July 2021.

=== Tor Browser ===
Tor Browser
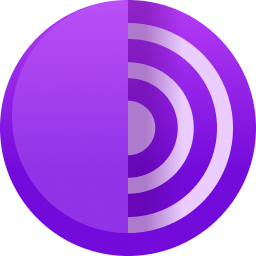

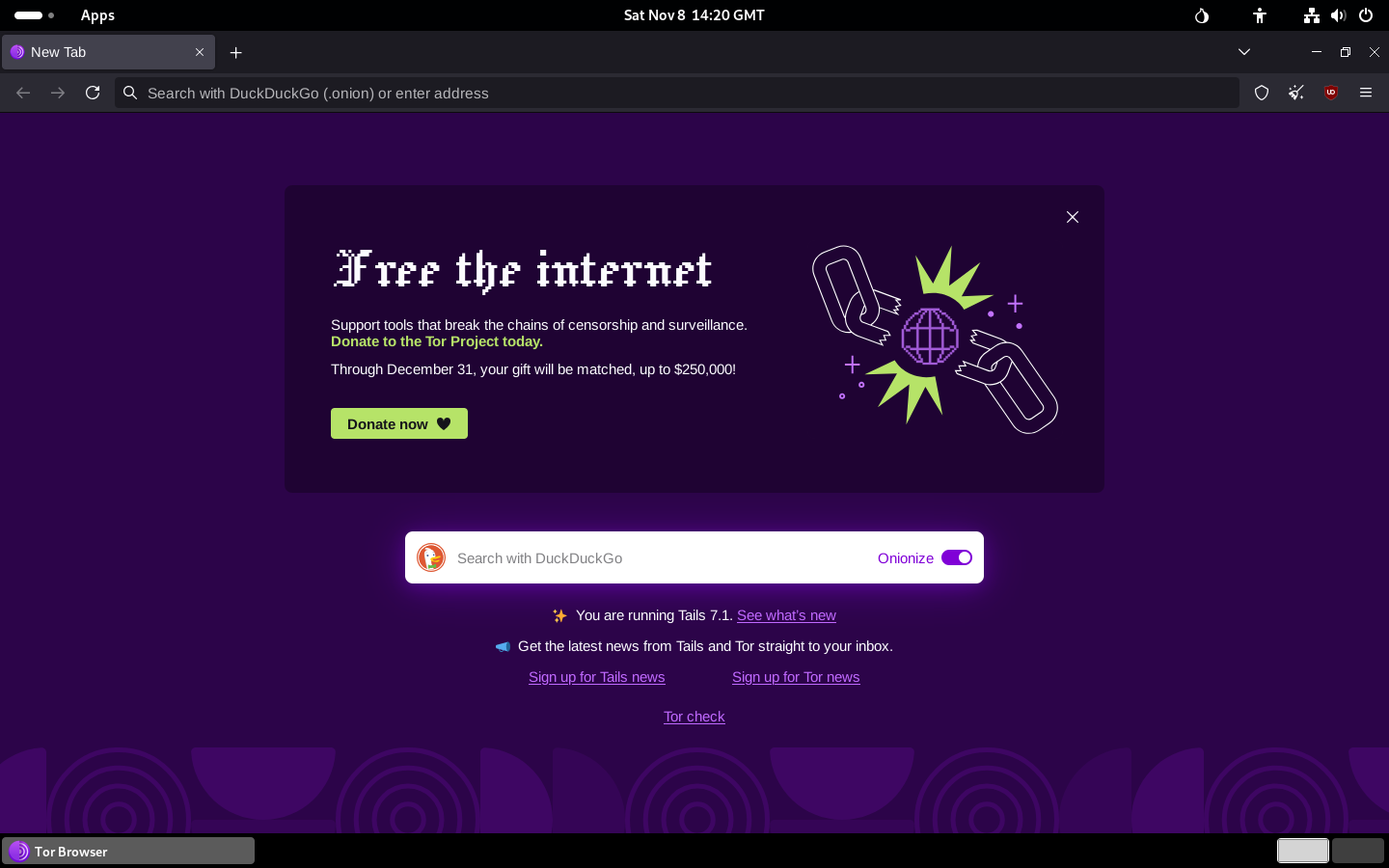
- Tor Browser showing its start page – about:tor
- Developer: Tor Project

Stable release(s)
- Android: 16.0.1 / 10 November 2026
- Linux: 16.0.1 / 10 November 2026
- macOS: 16.0.1 / 10 November 2026
- Windows: 16.0.1 / 10 November 2026

Preview release(s)
- Android: 16.0a14 / 16 October 2026
- Linux: 16.0a14 / 16 October 2026
- macOS: 16.0a14 / 16 October 2026
- Windows: 16.0a14 / 16 October 2026
- Engine: Gecko
- Operating system: Windows 10 and later; Unix-like (inc. macOS); Android
- Size: 90–165 MB
- Available in: 37 languages
- Type: Onion routing, anonymity, web browser, feed reader
- License: Mozilla Public License
- Website: www.torproject.org/download/
- Repository: gitlab.torproject.org/tpo/applications/tor-browser

The Tor Browser is a web browser capable of accessing the Tor network. It was created as the Tor Browser Bundle by Steven J. Murdoch and announced in January 2008. The Tor Browser consists of a modified Mozilla Firefox ESR web browser, the TorButton, TorLauncher, NoScript and the Tor proxy. Users can run the Tor Browser from removable media. It can operate under Microsoft Windows, macOS, Android and Linux.

The default search engine is currently DuckDuckGo, and was previously Startpage.com. The Tor Browser automatically starts Tor background processes and routes traffic through the Tor network. Upon termination of a session the browser deletes privacy-sensitive data such as HTTP cookies and the browsing history. This is effective in reducing web tracking, and also helps to prevent creation of a filter bubble.

Tor Browser offers three security levels that allow users to enhance the browser's security by disabling certain features which are not always necessary for browsing the web:

- Standard: All website functions supported by Tor Browser, such as JavaScript, fonts, and multimedia, are enabled.
- Safer: Some features known to be common attack vectors are disabled. JavaScript is disabled on all websites not secured by TLS; some fonts and mathematical symbols are disabled; videos and audio are click-to-play.
- Safest: Only features necessary for static websites and basic services are enabled. JavaScript is disabled globally; some fonts, icons, math symbols, and images are disabled; videos and audio are click-to-play.

To allow download from places where accessing the Tor Project URL may be risky or blocked, a GitHub repository is maintained with links for releases hosted in other domains.

=== Tor Messenger ===
Tor Messenger
- Developer: The Tor Project
- Release: 29 October 2015; 11 years ago
- Final release: 0.5.0-beta-1 / 28 September 2017; 9 years ago
- Written in: C/C++, JavaScript, CSS, XUL
- Operating system: Windows XP and later; Unix-like (inc. macOS)
- Available in: English
- Website: gitlab.torproject.org/legacy/trac/-/wikis/doc/TorMessenger
- Repository: gitlab.torproject.org/legacy/gitolite/tor-messenger-build

Tor Messenger was software that sent instant messages using the Tor network. It was active from 2015 to 2018.

On 29 October 2015, the Tor Project released Tor Messenger Beta, an instant messaging program based on Instantbird with Tor and OTR built in and used by default. Like Pidgin and Adium, Tor Messenger supports multiple different instant messaging protocols; however, it accomplishes this without relying on libpurple, implementing all chat protocols in the memory-safe language JavaScript instead.

According to Lucian Armasu of Toms Hardware, in April 2018, the Tor Project shut down the Tor Messenger project for three reasons: the developers of Instantbird discontinued support for their own software, limited resources, and known metadata problems. The Tor Messenger developers explained that overcoming any vulnerabilities discovered in the future would be impossible due to the project relying on outdated software dependencies.

=== Tor Phone ===
In 2016, Tor developer Mike Perry announced a prototype Tor-enabled smartphone based on CopperheadOS. It was meant as a direction for Tor on mobile. The project was called 'Mission Improbable'. Copperhead's then lead developer Daniel Micay welcomed the prototype.

=== Third-party applications ===
The Vuze (formerly Azureus) BitTorrent client, Bitmessage anonymous messaging system, and TorChat instant messenger include Tor support. The Briar messenger routes all messaging via Tor by default. OnionShare allows users to share files using Tor.

The Guardian Project is actively developing a free and open-source suite of applications and firmware for the Android operating system to improve the security of mobile communications. The applications include the ChatSecure instant messaging client, Orbot Tor implementation (also available for iOS), Orweb (discontinued) privacy-enhanced mobile browser, Orfox, the mobile counterpart of the Tor Browser, ProxyMob Firefox add-on, and ObscuraCam.

Onion Browser is an open-source, privacy-enhancing web browser for iOS, which uses Tor. It is available in the iOS App Store, and source code is available on GitHub.

Brave added support for Tor into its desktop browser's private-browsing mode in 2018, with the release of version 0.23.

Orbot logo

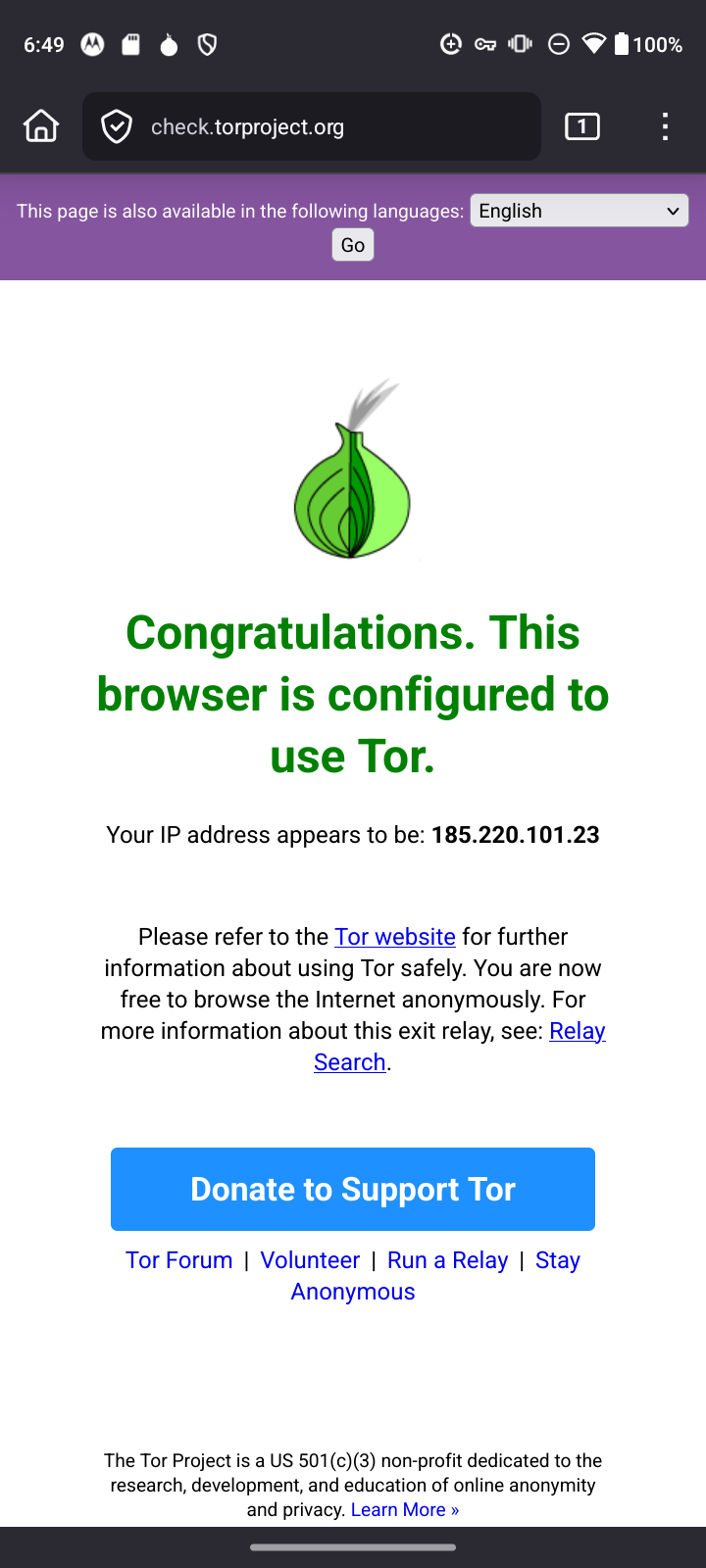
Orbot 17.5.0, running under Firefox for Android

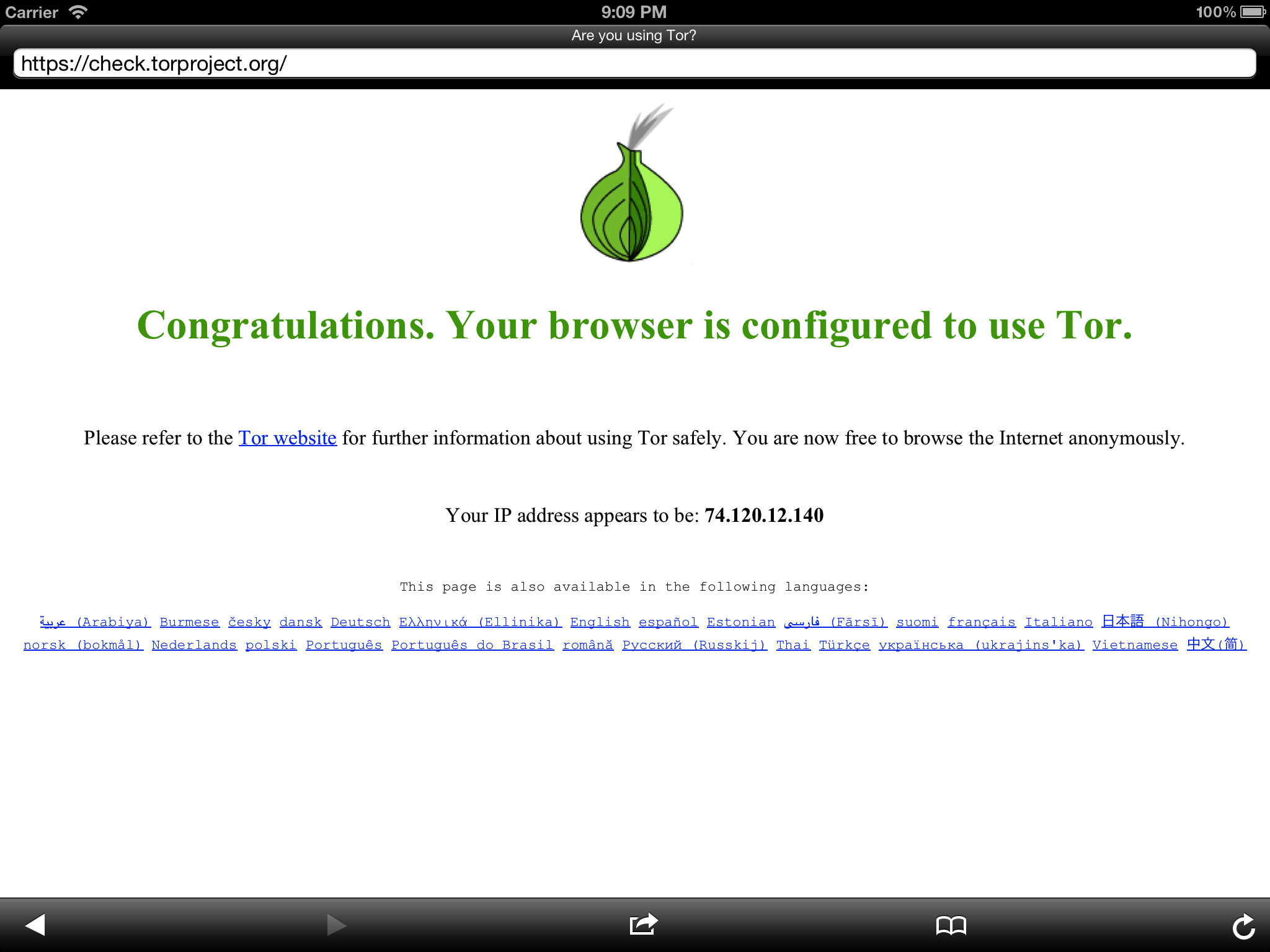
Onion Browser on iPad

=== Security-focused operating systems ===
In September 2024, it was announced that Tails, a security-focused operating system, had become part of the Tor Project. Other security-focused operating systems that make or made extensive use of Tor include Hardened Linux From Scratch, Incognito, Liberté Linux, Qubes OS, Subgraph, Parrot OS, Tor-ramdisk, and Whonix.

== Reception, impact, and legislation ==
A very brief animated primer on Tor pluggable transports, a method of accessing the anonymity network

Tor has been praised for providing privacy and anonymity to vulnerable Internet users such as political activists fearing surveillance and arrest, ordinary web users seeking to circumvent censorship, and people who have been threatened with violence or abuse by stalkers. The U.S. National Security Agency (NSA) has called Tor "the king of high-secure, low-latency Internet anonymity", and BusinessWeek magazine has described it as "perhaps the most effective means of defeating the online surveillance efforts of intelligence agencies around the world". Other media have described Tor as "a sophisticated privacy tool", "easy to use" and "so secure that even the world's most sophisticated electronic spies haven't figured out how to crack it".

Advocates for Tor say it supports freedom of expression, including in countries where the Internet is censored, by protecting the privacy and anonymity of users. The mathematical underpinnings of Tor lead it to be characterized as acting "like a piece of infrastructure, and governments naturally fall into paying for infrastructure they want to use".

The project was originally developed on behalf of the U.S. intelligence community and continues to receive U.S. government funding, and has been criticized as "more resembl[ing] a spook project than a tool designed by a culture that values accountability or transparency". As of 2012, 80% of The Tor Project's $2M annual budget came from the United States government, with the U.S. State Department, the Broadcasting Board of Governors, and the National Science Foundation as major contributors, aiming "to aid democracy advocates in authoritarian states". Other public sources of funding include DARPA, the U.S. Naval Research Laboratory, and the Government of Sweden. Some have proposed that the government values Tor's commitment to free speech, and uses the darknet to gather intelligence. Tor also receives funding from NGOs including Human Rights Watch, and private sponsors including Reddit and Google. Dingledine said that the United States Department of Defense funds are more similar to a research grant than a procurement contract. Tor executive director Andrew Lewman said that even though it accepts funds from the U.S. federal government, the Tor service did not collaborate with the NSA to reveal identities of users.

Critics say that Tor is not as secure as it claims, pointing to U.S. law enforcement's investigations and shutdowns of Tor-using sites such as web-hosting company Freedom Hosting and online marketplace Silk Road. In October 2013, after analyzing documents leaked by Edward Snowden, The Guardian reported that the NSA had repeatedly tried to crack Tor and had failed to break its core security, although it had had some success attacking the computers of individual Tor users. The Guardian also published a 2012 NSA classified slide deck, entitled "Tor Stinks", which said: "We will never be able to de-anonymize all Tor users all the time", but "with manual analysis we can de-anonymize a very small fraction of Tor users". When Tor users are arrested, it is typically due to human error, not to the core technology being hacked or cracked. On 7 November 2014, for example, a joint operation by the FBI, ICE Homeland Security Investigations and European Law enforcement agencies led to 17 arrests and the seizure of 27 sites containing 400 pages. A late 2014 report by Der Spiegel using a new cache of Snowden leaks revealed, however, that as of 2012 the NSA deemed Tor on its own as a "major threat" to its mission and, when used in conjunction with other privacy tools such as OTR, Cspace, ZRTP, RedPhone, Tails, and TrueCrypt, was ranked as "catastrophic," leading to a "near-total loss/lack of insight to target communications, presence..."

=== 2011 ===
In March 2011, The Tor Project received the Free Software Foundation's 2010 Award for Projects of Social Benefit. The citation read, "Using free software, Tor has enabled roughly 36 million people around the world to experience freedom of access and expression on the Internet while keeping them in control of their privacy and anonymity. Its network has proved pivotal in dissident movements in both Iran and more recently Egypt."

Iran tried to block Tor at least twice in 2011. One attempt simply blocked all servers with 2-hour-expiry security certificates; it succeeded for less than 24 hours.

=== 2012 ===
In 2012, Foreign Policy magazine named Dingledine, Mathewson, and Syverson among its Top 100 Global Thinkers "for making the web safe for whistleblowers".

=== 2013 ===
In 2013, Jacob Appelbaum described Tor as a "part of an ecosystem of software that helps people regain and reclaim their autonomy. It helps to enable people to have agency of all kinds; it helps others to help each other and it helps you to help yourself. It runs, it is open and it is supported by a large community spread across all walks of life."

In June 2013, whistleblower Edward Snowden used Tor to send information about PRISM to The Washington Post and The Guardian.

=== 2014 ===
In 2014, the Russian government offered a $111,000 contract to "study the possibility of obtaining technical information about users and users' equipment on the Tor anonymous network".

In September 2014, in response to reports that Comcast had discouraged customers from using the Tor Browser, Comcast issued a public statement that "We have no policy against Tor, or any other browser or software."

In October 2014, The Tor Project hired the public relations firm Thomson Communications to improve its public image (particularly regarding the terms "Dark Net" and "hidden services," which are widely viewed as being problematic) and to educate journalists about the technical aspects of Tor.

Turkey blocked downloads of Tor Browser from the Tor Project.

=== 2015 ===
In June 2015, the special rapporteur from the United Nations' Office of the High Commissioner for Human Rights specifically mentioned Tor in the context of the debate in the U.S. about allowing so-called backdoors in encryption programs for law enforcement purposes in an interview for The Washington Post.

In July 2015, the Tor Project announced an alliance with the Library Freedom Project to establish exit nodes in public libraries. The pilot program, which established a middle relay running on the excess bandwidth afforded by the Kilton Library in Lebanon, New Hampshire, making it the first library in the U.S. to host a Tor node, was briefly put on hold when the local city manager and deputy sheriff voiced concerns over the cost of defending search warrants for information passed through the Tor exit node. Although the Department of Homeland Security (DHS) had alerted New Hampshire authorities to the fact that Tor is sometimes used by criminals, the Lebanon Deputy Police Chief and the Deputy City Manager averred that no pressure to strong-arm the library was applied, and the service was re-established on 15 September 2015. U.S. Rep. Zoe Lofgren (D-Calif) released a letter on 10 December 2015, in which she asked the DHS to clarify its procedures, stating that "While the Kilton Public Library's board ultimately voted to restore their Tor relay, I am no less disturbed by the possibility that DHS employees are pressuring or persuading public and private entities to discontinue or degrade services that protect the privacy and anonymity of U.S. citizens." In a 2016 interview, Kilton Library IT Manager Chuck McAndrew stressed the importance of getting libraries involved with Tor: "Librarians have always cared deeply about protecting privacy, intellectual freedom, and access to information (the freedom to read). Surveillance has a very well-documented chilling effect on intellectual freedom. It is the job of librarians to remove barriers to information." The second library to host a Tor node was the Las Naves Public Library in Valencia, Spain, implemented in the first months of 2016.

In August 2015, an IBM security research group, called "X-Force", put out a quarterly report that advised companies to block Tor on security grounds, citing a "steady increase" in attacks from Tor exit nodes as well as botnet traffic.

In September 2015, Luke Millanta created OnionView (now defunct), a web service that plots the location of Tor relay nodes onto an interactive map of the world. The project's purpose was to detail the network's size and escalating growth rate.

In December 2015, Daniel Ellsberg (of the Pentagon Papers), Cory Doctorow (of Boing Boing), Edward Snowden, and artist-activist Molly Crabapple, amongst others, announced their support of Tor.

=== 2016 ===
In March 2016, New Hampshire state representative Keith Ammon introduced a bill allowing public libraries to run privacy software. The bill specifically referenced Tor. The text was crafted with extensive input from Alison Macrina, the director of the Library Freedom Project. The bill was passed by the House 268–62.

Also in March 2016, the first Tor node, specifically a middle relay, was established at a library in Canada, the Graduate Resource Centre (GRC) in the Faculty of Information and Media Studies (FIMS) at the University of Western Ontario. Given that the running of a Tor exit node is an unsettled area of Canadian law, and that in general institutions are more capable than individuals to cope with legal pressures, Alison Macrina of the Library Freedom Project has opined that in some ways she would like to see intelligence agencies and law enforcement attempt to intervene in the event that an exit node were established.

On 16 May 2016, CNN reported on the case of core Tor developer "isis agora lovecruft", who had fled to Germany under the threat of a subpoena by the FBI during the Thanksgiving break of the previous year. The Electronic Frontier Foundation legally represented lovecruft.

On 2 December 2016, The New Yorker reported on burgeoning digital privacy and security workshops in the San Francisco Bay Area, particularly at the hackerspace Noisebridge, in the wake of the 2016 United States presidential election; downloading the Tor browser was mentioned. Also, in December 2016, Turkey blocked the usage of Tor, together with ten of the most used VPN services in Turkey, which were popular ways of accessing banned social media sites and services.

Tor (and Bitcoin) was fundamental to the operation of the dark web marketplace AlphaBay, which was taken down in an international law enforcement operation in July 2017. Despite federal claims that Tor would not shield a user, elementary operational security errors outside of the ambit of the Tor network led to the site's downfall.

=== 2017 ===
In June 2017 the Democratic Socialists of America recommended intermittent Tor usage for politically active organizations and individuals as a defensive mitigation against information security threats. And in August 2017, according to reportage, cybersecurity firms which specialize in monitoring and researching the dark web (which relies on Tor as its infrastructure) on behalf of banks and retailers routinely share their findings with the FBI and with other law enforcement agencies "when possible and necessary" regarding illegal content. The Russian-speaking underground offering a crime-as-a-service model is regarded as being particularly robust.

=== 2018 ===
In June 2018, Venezuela blocked access to the Tor network. The block affected both direct connections to the network and connections being made via bridge relays.

On 20 June 2018, Bavarian police raided the homes of the board members of the non-profit Zwiebelfreunde, a member of torservers.net, which handles the European financial transactions of riseup.net in connection with a blog post there which apparently promised violence against the upcoming Alternative for Germany convention. Tor came out strongly against the raid on its support organization, which provides legal and financial aid for the setting up and maintenance of high-speed relays and exit nodes. According to torservers.net, on 23 August 2018 the German court at Landgericht München ruled that the raid and seizures were illegal. The hardware and documentation seized had been kept under seal, and purportedly were neither analyzed nor evaluated by the Bavarian police.

Since October 2018, Chinese online communities within Tor have begun to dwindle due to increased efforts to stop them by the Chinese government.

=== 2019 ===
In November 2019, Edward Snowden called for a full, unabridged simplified Chinese translation of his autobiography, Permanent Record, as the Chinese publisher had violated their agreement by expurgating all mentions of Tor and other matters deemed politically sensitive by the Chinese Communist Party.

=== 2021 ===
On 8 December 2021, the Russian government agency Roskomnadzor announced it has banned Tor and six VPN services for failing to abide by the Russian Internet blacklist. Russian ISPs attempted to block Tor's main website as well as several bridges beginning on 1 December 2021. The Tor Project has appealed to Russian courts over this ban.

=== 2022 ===
In response to Internet censorship during the Russian invasion of Ukraine, the BBC and VOA have directed Russian audiences to Tor. The Russian government increased efforts to block access to Tor through technical and political means, while the network reported an increase in traffic from Russia, and increased Russian use of its anti-censorship Snowflake tool.

Russian courts temporarily lifted the blockade on Tor's website (but not connections to relays) on May 24, 2022 due to Russian law requiring that the Tor Project be involved in the case. The blockade was reinstated on July 21, 2022.

Iran implemented rolling internet blackouts during the Mahsa Amini protests, and Tor and Snowflake were used to circumvent them.

China, with its highly centralized control of its internet, had effectively blocked Tor.

=== 2026 ===
In January Iran International reported that Tor was seeing use in the aftermath of the 2026 Iran protests, albeit with limited success.

== Improved security ==
Tor responded to earlier vulnerabilities listed above by patching them and improving security. In one way or another, human (user) errors can lead to detection. The Tor Project website provides the best practices (instructions) on how to properly use the Tor browser. When improperly used, Tor is not secure. For example, Tor warns its users that not all traffic is protected; only the traffic routed through the Tor browser is protected. Users are also warned to use HTTPS versions of websites, not to torrent with Tor, not to enable browser plugins, not to open documents downloaded through Tor while online, and to use safe bridges. Users are also warned that they cannot provide their name or other revealing information in web forums over Tor and stay anonymous at the same time.

Despite intelligence agencies' claims that 80% of Tor users would be de-anonymized within 6 months in the year 2013, that has still not happened. In fact, as late as September 2016, the FBI could not locate, de-anonymize and identify the Tor user who hacked into the email account of a staffer on Hillary Clinton's email server.

The best tactic of law enforcement agencies to de-anonymize users appears to remain with Tor-relay adversaries running poisoned nodes, as well as counting on the users themselves using the Tor browser improperly. For example, downloading a video through the Tor browser and then opening the same file on an unprotected hard drive while online can make the users' real IP addresses available to authorities.

=== Odds of detection ===
When properly used, odds of being de-anonymized through Tor are said to be extremely low. Tor project's co-founder Nick Mathewson explained that the problem of "Tor-relay adversaries" running poisoned nodes means that a theoretical adversary of this kind is not the network's greatest threat:

"No adversary is truly global, but no adversary needs to be truly global," he says. "Eavesdropping on the entire Internet is a several-billion-dollar problem. Running a few computers to eavesdrop on a lot of traffic, a selective denial of service attack to drive traffic to your computers, that's like a tens-of-thousands-of-dollars problem." At the most basic level, an attacker who runs two poisoned Tor nodes—one entry, one exit—is able to analyse traffic and thereby identify the tiny, unlucky percentage of users whose circuit happened to cross both of those nodes. In 2016 the Tor network offers a total of around 7,000 relays, around 2,000 guard (entry) nodes and around 1,000 exit nodes. So the odds of such an event happening are one in two million (1/2000 × 1/1000), give or take."

Tor does not provide protection against end-to-end timing attacks: if an attacker can watch the traffic coming out of the target computer, and also the traffic arriving at the target's chosen destination (e.g. a server hosting a .onion site), that attacker can use statistical analysis to discover that they are part of the same circuit.

A similar attack has been used by German authorities to track down users related to Boystown.

== See also ==
- Anonymous P2P
- Anonymous web browsing
- Crypto-anarchism
- Darknet
- Deep web
- Freedom of information
- Freenet
- GNUnet
- I2P
- Internet censorship circumvention
- Internet privacy
- Signal
- Privacy software
- Privoxy
- Proxy server
- Psiphon
- Tor Phone
- ZeroNet
