= Airbiquity =

- Type: Privately Held Company
- Industry: Automotive Telematics: Connected Vehicle Services
- Founded: 1997
- Headquarters: Seattle, WA, USA
- Areas served: Americas, Europe, Middle East/Africa, Asia, Oceana
- Products: Over-the-air (OTA) Software and Data Management
- Brands: OTAmatic Software Management Platform, DATAmatic Edge Data Management Platform, Choreo Connected Vehicle Service-Delivery Platform
- Website: www.airbiquity.com

Airbiquity Inc. was a business-to-business (B2B) software development and engineering company operating in the automotive telematics industry. Airbiquity's business model was to develop, deploy, and support the ongoing management of connected car programs for automotive industry customers.

== History ==
The company was founded in 1997 as Integrated Data Communications Inc. located on Bainbridge Island across the Puget Sound from Seattle. In 2000, the company changed its name to Airbiquity Inc. and later relocated to the Seattle downtown waterfront in 2006.

During its early years Airbiquity's primary product was aqLink, a patented in-band software modem enabling vehicle connectivity and two-way data transfer over cellular voice networks using embedded TCUs or consumer cell phones with Bluetooth connections. The introduction of aqLink was followed by a series of product upgrades and line extensions, including aqServer for transmission, receipt and processing of information transported to data and call center providers over UMTS, CDMA, TDMA or GSM wireless network voice channels.

In 2001, Airbiquity secured a contract with General Motors to license aqLink technology to support location-based communications for its OnStar service. Other automakers licensed aqLink technology for their connected car programs. According to Airbiquity, aqLink technology has been licensed for use in over 25 million production vehicles globally. The ability to provide voice and data services marked the start of branded connected car programs from automakers seeking to differentiate their vehicles from competitors. These programs have since expanded to include other features and services such as over-the-air (OTA) software and data management, infotainment delivery, remote vehicle management, electric vehicle management, and commercial fleet management.

In early 2024 Airbiquity's assets and a subset of the company's engineering staff were acquired by Karma Automotive

== Prior Offerings ==
- OTAmatic
- DATAmatic
- aqLink
- aqServer
- Fleet Management
- Safety & Security
- Electric Vehicle
- Infotainment Delivery

== Choreo ==
Airbiquity launched Choreo, a cloud-based connected car service delivery platform, in 2008. The first automaker program to deploy on Choreo was Ford Sync in 2008.
