= WikiLeaks-related Twitter court orders =

Subpoenas and gag orders sent to Twitter about WikiLeaks

The WikiLeaks-related Twitter court orders were United States Department of Justice 2703(d) orders (called so because they are authorized by 18 U.S.C. 2703(d)) accompanied by gag orders (authorized by 18 U.S.C. 2705(b), both as differentiated from subpoenas and national security letters) issued to Twitter in relation to ongoing investigations of WikiLeaks issued on 14 December 2010. The U.S. government sent Twitter a subpoena for information about Julian Assange and several other WikiLeaks-related persons, including Chelsea Manning. Twitter appealed against the accompanying gag order in order to be able to disclose its existence to its users, and was ultimately successful in its appeal.

While only five people were individually named in the subpoena, according to lawyer Mark Stephens the order effectively entailed the collection of personal identifying information of over six hundred thousand Twitter users, principally those who were followers of WikiLeaks. Subsequent reactions included the discussion of secret subpoenas in the U.S., criticism of the particular subpoena issued, and calls for the recognition and emulation of Twitter's stance.

== Chronology ==
=== Subpoena issued with accompanying gag order ===
On 14 December 2010 the U.S. Department of Justice issued a subpoena directing Twitter to provide information in accordance with 18 U.S.C. 2703(d). The order additionally directed that Twitter should not disclose the existence of the subpoena without prior authorization. Julian Assange, Chelsea Manning, Rop Gonggrijp, Jacob Appelbaum and Birgitta Jonsdottir were named in the subpoena. The requested information included their user names, addresses, telephone numbers, bank account details, and credit card numbers.

Assange's lawyer Mark Stephens argued that since the application also extended to destination email addresses and IP addresses for any communication stored for the named accounts, personal identifying information was to be collected for some six hundred and thirty-four thousand followers of WikiLeaks' Twitter feed. WikiLeaks alleged it had reason to believe suggesting similar subpoenas had been issued to Google and Facebook, and lawyer Mark Stephens said that similar information had been sought from Google, Facebook and eBay's Skype unit.

=== Appeal and publication of the subpoena ===
Twitter applied to notify its users of the issue of the subpoena. On 5 January 2011 it was notified of the success in its appeal, allowing the company to inform its users and to give them ten days in turn in which to appeal. After Twitter informed Jonsdottir, she released a tweet stating "USA government wants to know about all my tweets and more since November 1st 2009. Do they realize I am a member of parliament in Iceland?"

Aden Fine of the ACLU said that "Twitter's e-mail indicated that it had not yet turned over to the U.S. government any records that prosecutors requested."

=== Users' opposition to the subpoena ===
Among those specifically named by the subpoena, Assange, Jonsdottir, Appelbaum and Gonggrijp all stated that they would oppose it. Lawyer Aden Fine of the ACLU participated in defending those subpoenaed. Jonsdottir stated that she had contacted the Icelandic Minister of Justice and Human Rights and commented that the "U.S. government is trying to criminalize whistleblowing and publication of whistleblowing material."

On 11 March, a U.S. judge upheld the request of the federal prosecutor for the records.

== Reactions ==
The New York Times observed that the US government issues over fifty thousand such requests for information each year, typically accompanied by the so-called gag order. Nicholas Merrill, the first to file a constitutional challenge against the use of national security letters, describes this as "a perfect example of how the government can use its broad powers to silence people". Lawmakers in Iceland criticised the subpoena as an instance of overreach. Assange's lawyer, Mark Stephens, said that the subpoena was an attempt to "shake the electronic tree in the hope some kind of criminal charge drops out the bottom of it."

Juan Cole, a historian of the modern Middle East and South Asia, described the subpoena as "a fishing expedition and legally fishy in that regard" that "is being pursued by the Obama administration out of terror that further massive leaks will be made public." He contrasted the legal action with the lack of legal actions against "Bush administration officials, such as Dick Cheney, who ordered people tortured [and] have not been in any way inconvenienced by Mssrs. Obama and Holder." WikiLeaks' list of 637,000 followers on Twitter dropped by 3,000 in the hours following the announcement of the US Department of Justice action.

Professor of Law Ben Saul argued that the US had been compelled to attempt to obtain information on citizens of other countries through action against its own companies due to its lack of overseas law enforcement powers, suggesting that "the real question is how will other countries react … will other governments try to do things to shut down this kind of investigation?" Members of the European Parliament from the Netherlands, Romania and the UK have questioned whether US 'snooping' on the Twitter accounts of those linked with WikiLeaks is in violation of European privacy laws.

The Electronic Frontier Foundation has since, comparing their law enforcement policies, stressed "how important it is that social media companies do what they can to protect the sensitive data they hold from the prying eyes of the government". Wired staff writer Ryan Singel said that Twitter's "action in asking for the gag order to be overturned sets a new precedent that we can only hope that other companies begin to follow" and summarised his point of view by saying "Twitter beta-tested a spine" and that Twitter's response should become an "industry standard".

== See also ==
- American Civil Liberties Union v. Ashcroft (2004) — first constitutional challenge of US PATRIOT Act national security letter provisions
- Electronic Communications Privacy Act (and its Stored Communications Act) — US Act of 1986, before widespread email and cellphone usage
- Foreign Intelligence Surveillance Act — US Act of 1978, preventing spying on US citizens without a court order
- Information sensitivity
- Patriot Act — US Act of 2001, introducing counter-terrorism measures
- Warrant canary
