= History of the Patriot Act =

USA PATRIOT Act
- Other short titles: Uniting and Strengthening America by Providing Appropriate Tools Required to Intercept and Obstruct Terrorism Act of 2001
- Long title: An Act to deter and punish terrorist acts in the United States and around the world, to enhance law enforcement investigatory tools, and for other purposes.
- Nicknames: Patriot Act
- Enacted by: the 107th United States Congress
- Effective: October 26, 2001

Citations
- Public law: 107-56
- Statutes at Large: 115 Stat. 272 (2001)

Codification
- Acts amended: Electronic Communications Privacy Act – Computer Fraud and Abuse Act – Foreign Intelligence Surveillance Act – Family Educational Rights and Privacy Act – Money Laundering Control Act – Bank Secrecy Act – Right to Financial Privacy Act – Fair Credit Reporting Act – Immigration and Nationality Act – Victims of Crime Act of 1984 – Telemarketing and Consumer Fraud and Abuse Prevention Act
- Titles amended: 8, 12, 15, 18, 20, 31, 42, 47, 49, 50
- U.S.C. sections created: 18 USC §2712, 31 USC §5318A, 15 USC §1681v, 8 USC §1226A, 18 USC §1993, 18 USC §2339, 18 USC §175b, 50 USC §403-5b, 51 USC §5103a
- U.S.C. sections amended: 8 USC §1105, 8 USC §1182g, 8 USC §1189, 8 USC §1202, 12 USC §248, 12 USC §1828, 12 USC §3414, 15 USC §1681a, 15 USC §6102, 15 USC §6106, 18 USC §7, 18 USC §81, 18 USC §175, 18 USC §470, 18 USC §471, 18 USC §472, 18 USC §473, 18 USC §474, 18 USC §476, 18 USC §477, 18 USC §478, 18 USC §479, 18 USC §480, 18 USC §481, 18 USC §484, 18 USC §493, 18 USC §917, 18 USC §930, 18 USC §981, 18 USC §1029, 18 USC §1030, 18 USC §1362, 18 USC §1363, 18 USC §1366, 18 USC §1956, 18 USC §1960, 18 USC §1961, 18 USC §1992, 18 USC §2155, 18 USC §2325, 18 USC §2331, 18 USC §2332e, 18 USC §2339A, 18 USC §2339B, 18 USC §2340A, 18 USC §2510, 18 USC §2511, 18 USC §2516, 18 USC §2517, 18 USC §2520, 18 USC §2702, 18 USC §2703, 18 USC §2707, 18 USC §2709, 18 USC §2711, 18 USC §3056, 18 USC §3077, 18 USC §3103, 18 USC §3121, 18 USC §3123, 18 USC §3124, 18 USC §3127, 18 USC §3286, 18 USC §3583, 20 USC §1232g, 20 USC §9007, 31 USC §310 (redesignated), 31 USC §5311, 31 USC §5312, 31 USC §5317, 31 USC §5318, 31 USC §5319, 31 USC §5321, 31 USC §5322, 31 USC §5324, 31 USC §5330, 31 USC §5331, 31 USC §5332, 31 USC §5341, 42 USC §2284, 42 USC §2284, 42 USC §3796, 42 USC §3796h, 42 USC §10601, 42 USC §10602, 42 USC §10603, 42 USC §10603b, 42 USC §14601, 42 USC §14135A, 47 USC §551, 49 USC §31305, 49 USC §46504, 49 USC §46505, 49 USC §60123, 50 USC §403-3c, 50 USC §401a, 50 USC §1702, 50 USC §1801, 50 USC §1803, 50 USC §1804, 50 USC §1805, 50 USC §1806, 50 USC §1823, 50 USC §1824, 50 USC §1842, 50 USC §1861, 50 USC §1862, 50 USC §1863

Legislative history
- Introduced in the House of Representatives as H.R. 3162 by Frank J. Sensenbrenner, Jr. (R–WI) on October 23, 2001; Committee consideration by United States House Committee on the Judiciary; Permanent Select Committee on Intelligence; Committee on Financial Services; Committee on International Relations; Committee on Energy and Commerce (Subcommittee on Telecommunications and the Internet); Committee on Education and the Workforce; Committee on Transportation and Infrastructure; Committee on Armed Services; Passed the House on October 24, 2001 (Yeas: 357; Nays: 66); Passed the Senate on October 25, 2001 (Yeas: 98; Nays: 1); Signed into law by President George W. Bush on October 26, 2001

The history of the USA PATRIOT Act involved many parties who opposed and supported the Patriot Act, which was proposed, enacted and signed into law 45 days after the September 11 terrorist attacks in 2001. The legislation, though approved by large majorities in the U.S. Senate and House of Representative, was controversial, and parts of the law were invalidated or modified by successful legal challenges over constitutional infringements to civil liberties. The Act had several sunset provisions, most reauthorized by the USA PATRIOT Improvement and Reauthorization Act of 2005 and the USA PATRIOT Act Additional Reauthorizing Amendments Act. Both reauthorizations incorporated amendments to the original USA PATRIOT Act, and other federal laws.

The catalyst for the USA PATRIOT Act occurred on September 11, 2001 when terrorists attacked and destroyed the World Trade Center in New York City and the western side of the Pentagon near Washington D.C. Within a few weeks of the September 11 attacks, a number of bills attempting to make changes to anti-terrorism laws were introduced into Congress. After the USA PATRIOT Act was passed it remained controversial, and began to be questioned by some members of Congress. A number of sections were struck by the courts. Some provisions were challenged by the American Civil Liberties Union (ACLU), who filed a lawsuit on April 9, 2004. In April 2005, a Senate Judicial Hearing on the Patriot Act was held. The Act was as controversial as ever, and more than a few groups were campaigning against it. Aside from the Electronic Frontier Foundation (EFF), the ACLU, the Center for Democracy & Technology (CDT), and the Electronic Privacy Information Center (EPIC), the Act had raised the ire of the American Library Association (ALA) and the American Booksellers Foundation for Freedom of Expression, who were all extremely concerned about the provisions of the Patriot Act.

In June, the Select Committee on Intelligence proposed legislation to the House on July 21 as the USA PATRIOT and Terrorism Prevention Reauthorization Act of 2005. It repealed the sunset date for surveillance provisions of the Patriot Act — in other words, it would have made those sections permanent. A number of amendments were also proposed and passed. The House responded on September 11 that they unanimously disagreed with the Senate amendment, and agreed to a conference. One provision struck down was the so-called "sneak and peek" provisions of the Patriot Act. These were struck down after the FBI wrongfully used the provision to arrest Portland attorney Brandon Mayfield on suspicions that he had been involved in the 2004 Madrid train bombings.

== Background ==
The Patriot Act made a number of changes to U.S. law. Key acts changed were the Foreign Intelligence Surveillance Act of 1978 (FISA), the Electronic Communications Privacy Act of 1986 (ECPA), the Money Laundering Control Act of 1986 and Bank Secrecy Act (BSA), as well as the Immigration and Nationality Act.

Title II of the Patriot Act made a number of significant changes to the laws relating to foreign intelligence surveillance, of which the main two Acts that were affected were FISA and the ECPA. FISA came about after the Watergate scandal and subsequent investigations by the Church Committee, which discovered and criticized abuses of domestic spying by the National Security Agency (NSA), Federal Bureau of Investigation (FBI) and Central Intelligence Agency (CIA). This led to widespread congressional and public outcry, resulting in Congress passing FISA in 1978. FISA governs the way in which U.S. intelligence agencies may conduct wiretaps and the interception of communications in order to gather foreign intelligence. FISA established the Foreign Intelligence Surveillance Court (FISC) and a FISC Court of Review which administer foreign intelligence related applications for access to business records, wiretaps, microphone "bugging," physical searches and the use of pen registers and trap and trace devices. The Act does not apply to U.S. citizens, but is limited to dealings with foreign powers and nationals.

The ECPA was an amendment to Title III of the Omnibus Crime Control and Safe Streets Act of 1968, which is sometimes known as the "Wiretap Statute." The Wiretap Statute was mainly the result of two Supreme Court cases — Katz v. United States and Berger v. New York — and from criticism by the Church Committee of the actions of COINTELPRO (Counter Intelligence Program). The Supreme Court found in both Katz v. U.S. and Berger v. New York that Fourth Amendment search and seizure protections prohibited warrantless wiretaps. COINTELPRO was a program of the FBI that was aimed at investigating and disrupting dissident political organizations within the United States. COINTELPRO's operations during 1956 to 1971 were broadly targeted against organizations that were (at the time) considered to have politically radical elements. These included those whose stated goal was the violent overthrow of the U.S. government (such as the Weathermen), non-violent civil rights groups such as Martin Luther King Jr.'s Southern Christian Leadership Conference and violent groups like the Ku Klux Klan and the American Nazi Party. The Church Committee found that most of the surveillance was illegal. Consequently, Title III of the Omnibus Crime Control and Safe Streets Act, though noting that wiretaps and interception of communications are a vital part of the law enforcement, found that wiretapping had been undertaken without legal sanction and were being used to overhear the private conversations of U.S. citizens without their consent. These conversations were then often being used as evidence in court proceedings. Therefore, in order to protect the integrity of the courts while also ensuring the privacy of citizens was not violated, the Act provided a legal framework within which wiretaps and interceptions of communications could be used. The Act requires a court order authorizing the use of such measures against U.S. citizens, with penalties for those who do not get such authorization. The notable exception to these orders is in section 18 U.S.C. § 2511(3), which makes an exception to the restrictions of wiretaps in cases where the President must take measures to protect the U.S. from actual or potential hostile actions from a foreign power.

When Title III was established telecommunications was in its infancy and since that time many advances in communications technology have been made. This made it necessary to update the law to take into account these new developments. Thus, the ECPA was passed, and extended Title III to also protect wire, oral and electronic communications while in transit, as well as protecting stored electronic communications. The ECPA also extended the prohibition of the use of pen register and/or trap and trace devices to record dialling information used in the process of transmitting wire or electronic communications without a search warrant.

Along with changes to surveillance measures, the Patriot Act also made substantial changes to laws relating to money laundering. The main law changed was the Money Laundering Control Act (MLCA), which was itself an amendment to the Bank Secrecy Act (BSA) The BSA was passed by Congress in 1970 and is designed to fight drug trafficking, money laundering and other financial crimes. It requires financial institutions to keep records of cash purchases of negotiable instruments, file reports of cash transactions exceeding a daily aggregate amount of $US10,000, and to report suspicious activity that might signify money laundering, tax evasion or other criminal activities. The MLCA, passed in 1986, further enhanced the BSA by making it a crime to structure transactions in such a way as to avoid BSA reporting requirements.

Immigration law was also tightened under the Patriot Act. The Immigration and Nationality Act of 1952 (INA), also known as the McCarran-Walter Act, was passed by Congress in 1952 and was designed to restrict immigration into the U.S. It allowed the government to deport immigrants or naturalized citizens engaged in subversive activities and also allowed the barring of suspected subversives from entering the country. The Act is codified under Title 8 of the United States Code, which primarily governs immigration and citizenship in the United States. Prior to the INA, a variety of statutes governed immigration law but were not organized within one body of text. The Act was later modified by the Immigration and Nationality Act of 1965, and then by the Immigration Reform and Control Act of 1986. Since the Patriot Act, Title 8 has been modified even further by various Acts, including the Real ID Act of 2005.

== September 11, 2001 terrorist attack ==
The catalyst for the USA PATRIOT Act occurred on September 11, 2001 when terrorists attacked and destroyed the World Trade Center in New York City and the western side of the Pentagon near Washington, D.C. In response President George W. Bush declared a war on terror and soon thereafter senators from both sides of politics started working on legislation that would give law enforcement greater powers and to prevent and investigate terrorism in the United States. The Patriot Act was written by Jim Sensenbrenner.

According to The Washington Post, Viet Dinh — who was then the Assistant Attorney General of the United States — started work on measures to increase the authority of Federal Agencies, reportedly based upon the understanding that "[t]he charge [from then Attorney General John Ashcroft] was very, very clear: 'all that is necessary for law enforcement, within the bounds of the Constitution, to discharge the obligation to fight this war against terror.' " Simultaneously, Jim Dempsey of the Center for Democracy and Technology (CDT), expressed concerns that civil liberties might be trampled in the rush to push through legislation. According to Dempsey, it was hard enough to get their attention, but "[even if] you [did,] some members of the House and Senate were, 'Don't bother me with the details.' " Various interested parties, including the CDT, the Electronic Frontier Foundation (EFF), the American Civil Liberties Union (ACLU) and the Electronic Privacy Information Center (EPIC), closely scrutinised and critiqued the various proposed bills leading to the final Act, as well as the Act itself once passed.

== First bills introduced ==
Within a few weeks of the September 11 attacks, a number of bills attempting to make changes to anti-terrorism laws were introduced into Congress. The first bill proposed was the Combating Terrorism Act of 2001, which was introduced by Republican senators Orrin Hatch (R-UT) and Jon Kyl (R-AZ) with Democratic senators Dianne Feinstein (D-CA) and Chuck Schumer (D-NY) on September 13. Among its proposed measures, it ordered a report on the readiness of the National Guard to pre-emptively disrupt domestic acts of terrorism that used weapons of mass destruction and called for long-term research and development into terrorist attacks. It also called for a review of the authority of Federal agencies to address terrorist acts, proposed a change that would have allowed the CIA to recruit terrorist informants and proposed to allow law enforcement agencies to disclose foreign intelligence that was discovered through wiretaps and other interception methods. The amendment proposed a Sense of Congress that not enough was being done to impede and investigate terrorist fundraising, and sought to increase measures to prevent the laundering of the proceeds of terrorism.

The Public Safety and Cyber Security Enhancement Act was introduced on September 20 to the House by Republican Rep. Lamar Smith (R-TX). Its main focus was on the unauthorized access of protected computers and proposed making modifications to the laws based on the Cable TV Privacy Act surrounding cable TV subscriber privacy, as well as various changes to pen register and trap and trace laws. The bill would have made an exception for foreign intelligence gathering in the laws that require a court order necessary for pen register and trap and trace surveillance. It would also have removed restrictions on the prohibition of gaining access to cable television subscriber records and only prohibited the disclosure of viewing patterns of cable television subscribers.

The Intelligence to Prevent Terrorism Act was introduced to the Senate on September 28 by Senators Bob Graham (D-FL) and Jay Rockefeller (D-WV). The bill proposed a number of changes relating to the Director of Central Intelligence (DCI). The most significant change proposed was to require the Attorney General or head of any other Federal department or agency to disclose to the DCI any foreign intelligence acquired in the course of a criminal investigation. However, it would also have required that the DCI and Secretary of the Treasury jointly report to Congress as to whether it would be a good idea to reconfigure the Office of Foreign Assets Control and its Foreign Terrorist Asset Tracking Center to provide for the analysis and dissemination of foreign intelligence relating to the financial capabilities and resources of international terrorist organizations. It would also have required the DCI to establish and maintain a National Virtual Translation Center for timely and accurate translations of foreign intelligence for elements of the intelligence community. Another area it covered was a proposal to make the Attorney General provide a program of training to Government officials regarding the identification and use of foreign intelligence.

== Anti-Terrorism Act of 2001 and Financial Anti-Terrorism Act ==
Meanwhile, Republican Senator Orrin Hatch, along with Democratic senators Patrick Leahy (D-VT) and Arlen Specter (R-PA), had been working with John Ashcroft on a draft bill, called the Anti-Terrorism Act of 2001. On September 19, 2001, this first draft is introduced to Congress. Many of the most controversial aspects of the USA PATRIOT Act were first part of this draft and it was later to be introduced as the PATRIOT Act/USA Act — which in turn became the basis for the final USA PATRIOT Act. Among other things, the administration proposal discussed extending roving wiretaps from the sole domain of domestic agencies into the domain of foreign intelligence surveillance and proposed the expansion of the use of wiretaps from phonelines to Internet technology. It would have made it possible for more law enforcement agencies to disseminate wiretap information and would have expanded the scope of surveillance subpoenas to allow broader access to personal records — including "books, records, papers, documents, and other items." Both the bill introduced by Senator Graham and the proposed Anti-Terrorism Act draft were referred to the Select Committee on Intelligence. According to The Washington Post, EPIC's Jim Dempsey and a number of other representatives from other civil liberties groups were invited to discussions about the draft, but Dempsey's recollection was that "They [members of the Department of Justice] were livid, [and they] explicitly said, 'We don't think outsiders should be here, and we won't talk unless they leave the room.'" Although a deal was brokered, this began causing tensions between parties negotiating the bill and previously amicable discussions started breaking down between Leahy and Ashcroft.

Also introduced into the House was the Financial Anti-Terrorism Act. This bill, which was later incorporated into the final USA PATRIOT Act, was introduced in the middle of October by Republican Representative Mike Oxley (R-OH), and was passed and then referred to the Committee on Banking, Housing, and Urban Affairs. It proposed strengthening financial law enforcement through a number of measures. These included establishing FinCEN as a bureau of the Department of the Treasury, enhancing forfeiture laws and preventing the structuring of transactions to bypass anti-money laundering and reporting legislation. It also proposed establishing measures to increase the cooperation between the public and private sectors when it came to reporting and preventing financial crimes such as money laundering, along with further measures to combat international money laundering.

== Birth of the USA PATRIOT Act ==
The first version of the Patriot Act was introduced into the House on October 2, 2001, as the Provide Appropriate Tools Required to Intercept and Obstruct Terrorism (PATRIOT) Act of 2001, and was later passed by the House as the Uniting and Strengthening America (USA) Act (H.R. 2975) on October 12. This was based on the afore-mentioned Anti-Terrorism Act, but had been changed after negotiations and work between Attorney General Ashcroft, Senators Leahy, Paul Sarbanes (D-MD), Bob Graham, Trent Lott (R-MS) and Orrin Hatch. It was introduced into the Senate as the USA Act of 2001 (S. 1510) by Tom Daschle (D-SD) where Senator Russ Feingold (D-WI) proposed a number of amendments, none of which were passed. Feingold amended the provision relating to interception of computer trespasser communications, limited the roving wiretap authority under FISA and modified the provisions relating to access to business records under FISA. The USA Act was later vitiated and indefinitely postponed, because the Senate and House bills could not be reconciled in time.

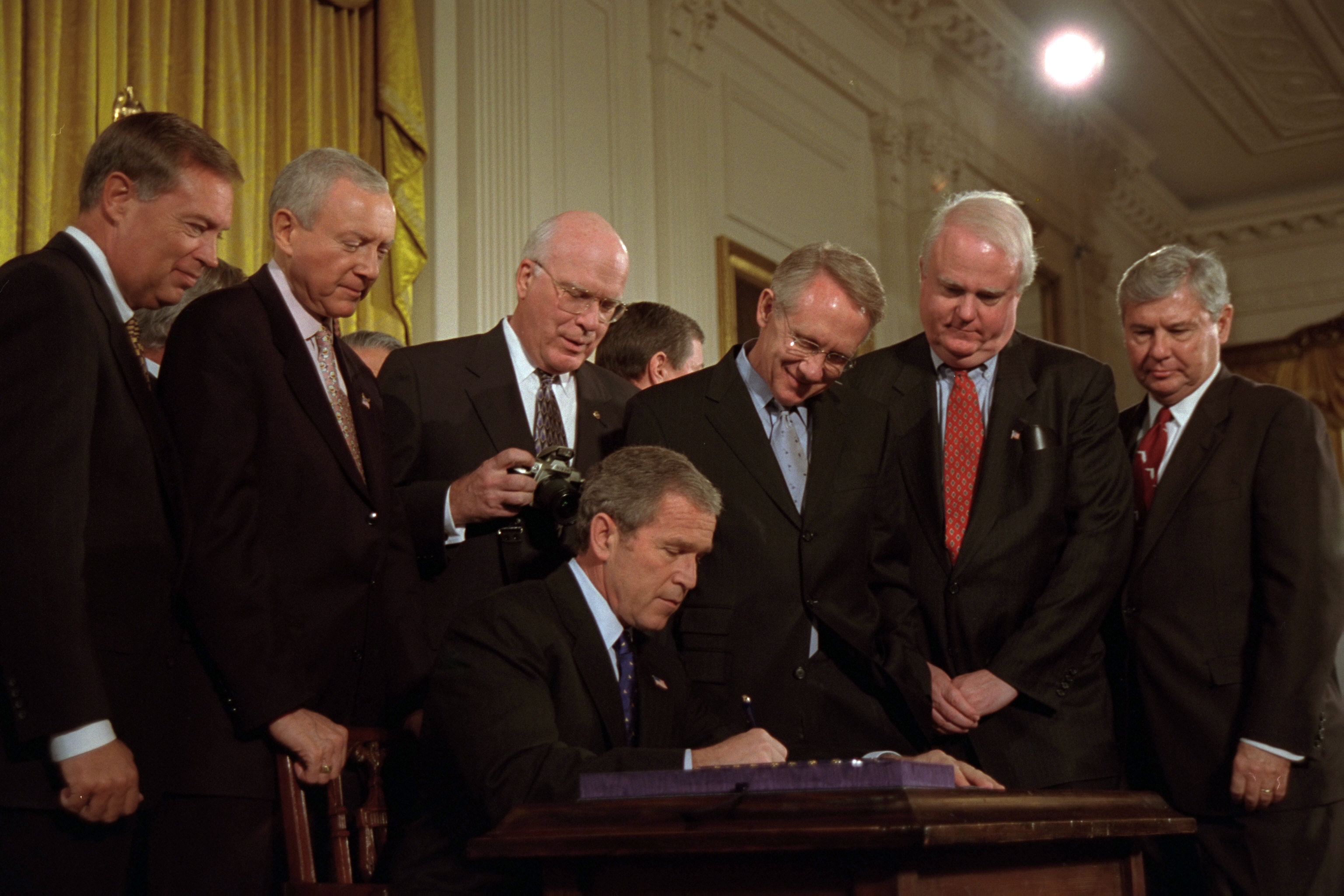
President George W. Bush signing the USA PATRIOT Act, in the White House's East Room on October 26, 2001

The USA PATRIOT Act, H.R. 3162, was introduced into the House on October 23. It incorporated H.R. 2975 and S. 1510 and many of the provisions of H.R. 3004 (the Financial Anti-Terrorism Act). Although there were some objections and concerns raised about the legislation, a motion was made to suspend the rules, and the bill was passed. Patrick Leahy in particular commented that "our ability to make rapid progress [on drafting the bill] was impeded because the negotiations with the Administration did not progress in a straight line. On several key issues that are of particular concern to me, we had reached an agreement with the Administration on Sunday, September 30. Unfortunately, over the next two days, the Administration announced that it was reneging on the deal. I appreciate the complex task of considering the concerns and missions of multiple Federal agencies, and that sometimes agreements must be modified as their implications are scrutinized by affected agencies. When agreements made by the Administration must be withdrawn and negotiations on resolved issues reopened, those in the Administration who blame the Congress for delay with what the New York Times described as "scurrilous remarks," do not help the process move forward." The Act was opposed by only one vote, the sole dissenting Senator being Russ Feingold who found a number of measures objectionable or troubling. Feingold's concerns included the way that the bill was passed, aspects of the wiretapping provisions, the changes to search and seizure laws, the expanded powers under FISA that allowed law enforcement to gain access to business records and the changes to detention and deportation laws for immigrants. The Act had a number of "sunsets" included in it after insistence by Republican Representative Richard Armey (R-TX) However, the Act took into account any ongoing foreign intelligence investigations and allowed them to continue once the sections had expired.

== Opposition grows ==
After the USA PATRIOT Act was passed it remained controversial, and began to be questioned by some members of Congress. On June 13, 2002, the House Committee on the Judiciary wrote a letter to Attorney General Ashcroft asking 50 questions about the use and effectiveness of the Act. In the letter they stated that "[t]he Committee is interested in hearing from you [John Ashcroft] and FBI Director Robert F. Mueller concerning the Department of Justice's use of [the Act's new investigative tools to combat new terrorist threats against the United States] and their effectiveness. In light of the broad scope of the Act, we are initially seeking written responses to the following questions, and we plan to schedule a hearing in the near future to allow further public discussion of these and other issues relating to the Department of Justice's activity in investigating terrorists or potential terrorist attacks." Only 28 questions were answered publicly, with 7 answered under separate cover to the Committee. Meanwhile, organisations such as the ACLU, the EFF and EPIC had not stopped opposing the most controversial parts of the Act. Three months after the official response to the Select Committee on the Judiciary, EPIC filed a Freedom of Information (FOI) request seeking the information that was not released by the U.S. Department of Justice. While the Department of Justice released a number of records in response to the request, they didn't release all the material, asserting that certain responsive records were exempt from disclosure. In order to gain access to these records, the ACLU and EPIC brought a civil action against the Department of Justice, and on November 26 U.S. District Judge Ellen Segal Huvelle ordered the Department of Justice to complete its processing of the FOI request by January 15, 2003.

Meanwhile, on July 31, the Protecting the Rights of Individuals Act was introduced into the Senate by Senators Lisa Murkowski (R-AK) and Ron Wyden (D-OR). It was the first of many bills introduced to attempt to change the Patriot Act. Among the changes were ones to FISA provisions, including limits to "sneak and peek" and roving wiretap provisions, the narrowing of the Patriot Act's definition of terrorism and the reinstatement of judicial review when agencies wished to access library and business records. It also would have restored the primary purpose criteria of FISA surveillance to be for foreign intelligence purposes, which had been changed in the Patriot Act to be a "significant purpose." The bill proposed a moratorium on data mining by agencies except under specific instances allowed under law and also would have prevented government access to education records without specific facts showing why those records were required in investigations. Further legislation attempting to curtail the Patriot Act was introduced into the House on September 24 by Dennis Kucinich (D-OH) and Ron Paul (R-TX). That bill was the Benjamin Franklin True Patriot Act, which is an allusion to Benjamin Franklin's famous quote that "those who would give up Essential Liberty, to purchase a little temporary Safety, deserve neither Liberty nor Safety." Among other things, it proposed a 90-day review period after which 11 sections of the Patriot Act would cease to have effect. It would have reverted the sections on sneak and peek searches, expansion of pen register and trap and trace authorities as well the authority for the FBI to gain access to records and other tangible items under FISA. Also reverted would have been the sections that changed the primary purpose test for foreign intelligence surveillance under FISA to "significant purpose", the mandatory detention of aliens, the use of National Security Letters and the broadened definition of "domestic terrorism." The bill was referred to subcommittees for consideration, where no further action was taken before the end of the 108th Congress. The bill never went further and it was never reintroduced. The bill was publicly supported by the ACLU and the EFF.

Further controversy soon came to a head when, in late January 2003, the founder of the Center for Public Integrity, Charles Lewis, published a leaked draft copy of an Administration proposal titled the Domestic Security Enhancement Act of 2003. The document was quickly dubbed "PATRIOT II" or "Son of PATRIOT" by the media and organisations such as the EFF. The draft, which was circulated to 10 divisions of the Department of Justice, proposed to make further modifications to extend the USA PATRIOT Act and would have made more changes to FISA, including extending the definition of a foreign power in relation to FISA and allowed the use of wiretaps 15 days after Congress authorized the use of military force (currently, the law allows this only after a declaration of war). Further, it would have allowed Federal agencies to acquire foreign government's spoken communications and would have expanded the use of pen registers under FISA to apply to U.S. citizens. It proposed that the FISA Court of Review be allowed to employ a lawyer with security clearance to defend the judgement of the FISC, and would have expanded the use of law enforcement investigative tools under FISA. Further gags were proposed in the draft and, had it been introduced into Congress, it would have prevented the disclosure of terrorism investigation detainee information, "Worst Case Scenario" information and information relating to Capitol buildings. The draft contained measures to further restrict what participants in Grand Jury terrorism hearings could disclose, while other proposed measures would have enhanced investigations into terrorism, including the establishment of a terrorism identification database. Changes were proposed to define terrorism as a crime and the legal framework with which to prosecute such crimes. Further modifications would have also changed immigration and border-security laws. Although the Department of Justice released a statement that it was only a draft, it caused an enormous amount of controversy, with many criticising it for impinging on privacy and civil liberties. In particular, Patrick Leahy complained that "If there is going to be a sequel to the USA PATRIOT Act, the process of writing it should be open and accountable. It should not be shrouded in secrecy, steeped in unilateralism or tinged with partisanship. The early signals from the Administration about its intentions for this bill are ominous, and I hope Justice Department officials will change the way they are handling this."

By now public opinion of the Act appeared to be waning, with a Gallup poll response to the question "Based on what you have read or heard, do you think the Patriot Act goes too far, is about right, or does not go far enough in restricting people's civil liberties in order to fight terrorism?" showing that between 2003 and 2004 nearly a quarter of all Americans felt that the Act went too far, while most felt that it was either just right or did not go far enough. In response, the Department of Justice established a website, www.lifeandliberty.gov, that defended the Act from such organizations as the ACLU (which itself had created a website that campaigned against the Patriot Act called Safe and Free). At the same time, Attorney General Ashcroft toured 16 cities giving speeches to invite only crowds defending the Patriot Act and touting its importance. In the speeches — which among other things made allusions to Bunker Hill, Antietam, the Argonne, Iwo Jima, Normandy and Abraham Lincoln — he defended the Patriot Act's provisions that eliminated the "wall" preventing foreign intelligence agencies from sharing information with domestic law enforcement agencies, roving wiretaps and the expanded capabilities of the U.S. Joint Terrorism Task Force. He also claimed that they had "neutralized alleged terrorist cells in Buffalo, Detroit, Seattle and Portland [and] brought 255 criminal charges. One hundred thirty two individuals have been convicted or pled guilty. All told, more than 3,000 suspected terrorists have been arrested in many countries. Many more have met a different fate." Among those arrested was Sami Amin Al-Arian and seven others who were indicted on 50 counts, including using an Islamic think tank to funnel funds to the group Palestinian Islamic Jihad, which is classed as a terrorist organization by the United States government. Ashcroft cited the arrests to show how the Patriot Act had broken down information sharing barriers between agencies. The speeches themselves were met with support, but in many states Ashcroft attracted protests and a number of critical editorials were written — in one particularly stinging column, The Philadelphia Inquirer wrote that there was "an air of desperation about it." Meanwhile, controversy over the Patriot Act was leading to resistance from many State and local governments. Arcata in California passed an ordinance in February 2003 that barred city employees (including police and librarians) from assisting or cooperating with any federal investigations under the Act that would violate civil liberties (Nullification). Eventually, eight states (Alaska, California, Colorado, Hawaii, Idaho, Maine, Montana and Vermont) and 396 cities and counties (including New York City; Los Angeles; Dallas; Chicago; Eugene, Oregon; Philadelphia; and Cambridge, Massachusetts) passed resolutions condemning the Act for attacking civil liberties. The Bill of Rights Defense Committee helped coordinate many local efforts. These ordinances are largely symbolic, as under the United States Constitution's Supremacy Clause, federal law overrides state and local laws.

== Security and Freedom Ensured Act ==
The Security and Freedom Ensured Act (SAFE) was introduced some time later by Republican Senator Larry Craig (R-ID). It was introduced on October 2, 2003, and was co-sponsored by Senators John E. Sununu (R-NH) and Richard Durbin (D-IL) and would have limited the scope of roving wiretaps, changed the "sneak and peek" delayed notification period from "within a reasonable period" to not later than 7 days after execution of the warrant, restored the requirements for seizure of business records that there are specific and articulate facts that business records are those of a foreign power or agents of a foreign power and prevent the use of National Security Letters to gain access to library records. It also would have extended the sunset provisions of the Patriot Act to include section 213 (Authority for delaying notice of the execution of a warrant), section 216 (Modification of authorities relating to use of pen registers and trap and trace devices), section 219 (Single-jurisdiction search warrants for terrorism) and section 505 (Miscellaneous national security authorities). The EFF urged the swift passage of the bill, while Senator Russell Feingold urged the bill be passed as "[t]hese are reasonable and moderate changes to the law. They do not gut the provision. They do not make it worthless. They do recognize the growing and legitimate concern from across the political spectrum that this provision was passed in haste and presents the potential for abuse. They also send a message that fourth amendment rights have meaning and potential violations of those rights should be minimized if at all possible." In Congressional debate, Rick Durbin stated that "many in Congress did not want to deny law enforcement some of the reasonable reforms contained in the PATRIOT Act that they needed to combat terrorism. So, we reluctantly decided to support the administration's version of the bill, but not until we secured a commitment that they would be responsive to Congressional oversight and consult extensively with us before seeking any further changes in the law."

In response to the bill, Attorney General Ashcroft wrote a four-page letter to Congress urging them not to make wholesale changes to the Patriot Act, and warned that President Bush would veto the bill if it appeared on his desk. Senator Durbin countered that this was "an unfortunate overreaction to a reasoned and measured effort to mend the Patriot Act [and] I believe it is possible to combat terrorism and preserve our individual freedoms at the same time." SAFE was referred to the Senate Committee on the Judiciary on April 7, 2004, and a Conference report prepared. However, the co-sponsors of the Act were extremely unhappy with the report, stating that "[t]he conference report, in its current form, is unacceptable. There is still time for the conference committee to step back and agree to the Senate's bipartisan approach. If the conference committee doesn't do that, we will fight to stop this bill from becoming law". Thus, this bill never proceeded any further.

== Judicial and legislative challenges ==
A number of sections were struck by the courts. Section 805 of the Patriot Act allowed the U.S. government to prohibit citizens from providing material support for specially designated terrorist organisations, including "expert advise and assistance." Two organisations so designated were the Kurdistan Workers Party (in Kurdish it is the Partiya Karkerên Kurdistan, or PDK) and the Liberation Tigers of Tamil Eelam (also known as either the Tamil Tigers, the Ellalan Force or the LTTE). The Humanitarian Law Project supported both groups, and brought a civil action against the government complaining that the law was unconstitutional. The Federal court agreed and in a decision brought in December 2004 struck down section 805(a)(2)(B) because, in the courts view, it violated the First and Fifth Amendments to the United States Constitution as it was so vague that it "could be construed to include unequivocally pure speech and advocacy protected by the First Amendment." In the decision, the judge determined that this vagueness would cause a person of average intelligence to guess whether they were breaking the law, and thus potentially cause a person to be charged for an offence that they had no way of knowing was illegal. The vagueness may also have the effect of allowing arbitrary and discriminatory enforcement of the law, as well as possible chilling effects on First Amendment rights. Soon after the decision, the Department of Justice released a statement that "The provision at issue in today's decision was a modest amendment to a pre-existing antiterrorism law that was designed to deal with real threats caused by support of terrorist groups. By targeting those who provide material support by providing 'expert advice or assistance' the law made clear that Americans are threatened as much by the person who teaches a terrorist to build a bomb as by the one who pushes the button."

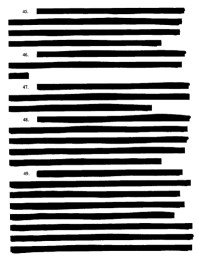
A heavily redacted page from a lawsuit filed by the ACLU — American Civil Liberties Union v. Ashcroft

Title V of the Patriot Act amended the ECPA's National Security Letter (NSL) provisions (18 U.S.C. § 2709). These were challenged by the ACLU, who filed a lawsuit on April 9, 2004, on behalf of an unknown party against the U.S. government. The specifics of the original case brought by the ACLU is not known, except that the unknown party is an internet service provider, and the case involves either wiretaps or secretly subpoenaed customer records from telephone and internet companies — ostensibly in the course of investigating possible terrorist activity. Due to the NSL provisions, the government would not let the ACLU disclose they had even filed a case for nearly a month, after which they were permitted to release a heavily redacted version of the complaint. The ACLU argued that the NSL violated the First and Fourth Amendments of the United States Constitution because section 2709 failed to spell out any legal process whereby a telephone or internet company could try to oppose an NSL subpoena in court. They also argued that section 2709 prohibited the recipient of an NSL subpoena from disclosing that they had received such a request from the FBI, and therefore outweighed the FBI's need for secrecy in counter-terrorism investigations. The Court subsequently found the NSL provisions of the ECPA unconstitutional. It reasoned that it could not find in the provision an implied right for the person receiving the subpoena to challenge it in court as is constitutionally required. The court found in favour of the ACLU, and declared the provision unconstitutional. The finding of unconstitutionality essentially dismisses any claimed presumptive legal need for absolute secrecy in regard to terrorism cases. However, the USA Patriot Act is affected only if the limits on NSLs in terrorism cases also apply to non-terrorism cases such as those authorized by the Act and even though the NSL was dropped, the John Doe remained under a gag order.

Legislative action was also undertaken by Bernie Sanders (I-VT), Jerrold Nadler (D-NY), John Conyers Jr., Clement Leroy Otter (R-ID) and Ron Paul. They proposed an amendment to the Commerce, Justice, State Appropriations Bill of 2005 which would cut off funding to the Department of Justice for searches conducted under section 215. The amendment initially failed to pass the House with a tie vote, 210–210. Although the original vote came down in favor of the amendment, the vote was held open and several House members were persuaded to change their votes. However, on June 15, 2005, they made a second attempt to limit section 215 searches in an amendment to another House appropriations bill and this time it passed with a vote of 238–187 in favor of the Sanders amendment.

Not all proposed legislation was against the Patriot Act, however. In July 2004, Senator Jon Kyl introduced the Tools to Fight Terrorism Act into the Senate. In a statement given on September 13 to the Senate Committee on the Judiciary, Senator Kyl stated his concern that "Congress has enacted no major antiterror legislation since the passage of the USA Patriot Act almost three years ago." The bill would have allowed FBI agents to seek warrants for surveillance of "lone wolf terrorists," allowed greater sharing of intelligence between federal authorities and state and local authorities, punish those making terrorism hoaxes, and impose 30-year mandatory-minimum penalties for possession of shoulder-fired anti-aircraft missiles, atomic and radiological bombs, and variola virus. However, perhaps due to the increasingly controversial nature of the Act, the Senate did not further consider the proposed legislation.

== Lead up to reauthorization ==
By now the sunsets in the Patriot Act were getting closer to expiring. The Bush administration had been campaigning for the reauthorization of the Act for some time, with the President speaking about the Act in his 2004 State of the Union Address, where he said that,

Inside the United States, where the [War on Terror] began, we must continue to give our homeland security and law enforcement personnel every tool they need to defend us. And one of those essential tools is the Patriot Act, which allows federal law enforcement to better share information, to track terrorists, to disrupt their cells, and to seize their assets. For years, we have used similar provisions to catch embezzlers and drug traffickers. If these methods are good for hunting criminals, they are even more important for hunting terrorists. Key provisions of the Patriot Act are set to expire next year. The terrorist threat will not expire on that schedule. Our law enforcement needs this vital legislation to protect our citizens. You need to renew the Patriot Act.

— 2004 United States State of the Union Address, United States President George W. Bush.

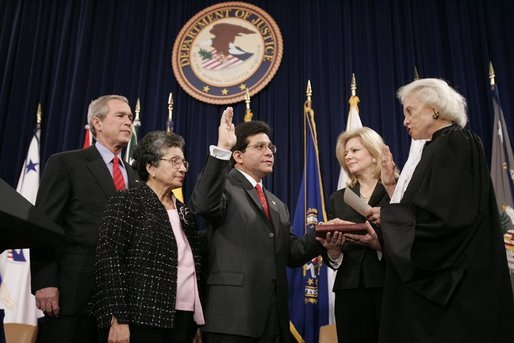
In February 2005, President George W. Bush urged the reauthorization of the USA PATRIOT Act during a speech given during the swearing in of Attorney General Alberto Gonzales.

President Bush also strongly urged for the Patriot Act to be reauthorized immediately when he swore in the successor to Attorney General John Ashcroft, Alberto Gonzales. In his swearing-in speech for Gonzales, Bush stated that "[m]any key elements of the Patriot Act are now set to expire at the end of this year. We must not allow the passage of time or the illusion of safety to weaken our resolve in this new war. To protect the American people, Congress must promptly renew all provisions of the Patriot Act this year."

In April 2005, a Senate Judicial Hearing on the Patriot Act was held. The newly appointed Attorney General admitted that he was "open to discussion" about the Act, but argued that not only was the Patriot Act working well and needed few changes, but that all 16 of the expiring sections of the Act should be reauthorized. He in particular commented on section 215, the section allowing national security authorities to produce court orders under FISA to gain access to personal records, and section 206, the roving wiretap authority provision. He emphasised "the department has not sought a Section 215 order to obtain library or bookstore records, medical records or gun sale records. Rather, the provision to date has been used only to obtain driver's license records, public accommodation records, apartment leasing records, credit card records and subscriber information, such as names and addresses for telephone numbers captured through court-authorized pen register devices." Section 217, the "sneak and peek" search provisions, were also raised as a concern and were defended by the Department of Justice.

President Bush continued to campaign for the reauthorization of the Act. In a speech given in June 2005 to the Ohio State Highway Patrol Academy he reiterated his belief that key provisions should be reauthorized, and that "The Patriot Act has accomplished exactly what it was designed to do: it has protected American liberty and saved American lives. For the sake of our national security, Congress must not rebuild a wall between law enforcement and intelligence." However, by this time the Act was as controversial as ever, and more than a few groups were campaigning against it. Aside from the EFF, the ACLU, the CDT and the EPIC, the Act had raised the ire of the American Library Association (ALA) and the American Booksellers Foundation for Freedom of Expression, who were all extremely concerned about the provisions of the Patriot Act, with a particular focus on section 215. An even more disparate group called the "Patriots to Restore Checks and Balances" (or PRCB) had also been formed to campaign against the Act, and were urging Congress to let the sections expire. Many unlikely bedfellows formed this group, and those numbered in its membership including the ACLU, the American Conservative Union, Gun Owners of America, and the United States Libertarian Party. The group had also supported the SAFE Act.

A tense period followed as proponents and critics of the Act continued arguing their respective positions. Tensions came to a head on June 10, when a hearing into the Patriot Act by the House Committee on the Judiciary ended in furore. During the testimony on the reauthorization of the Act, Chairman James Sensenbrenner abruptly gavelled the proceedings to a close after Congressional Democrats and their witnesses launched into broad denunciations of the war on terrorism and the condition of detainees at Guantanamo Bay. In frustration, Sensenbrenner declared, "We ought to stick to the subject. The USA PATRIOT Act has nothing to do with Guantanamo Bay. The USA PATRIOT Act has nothing to do with enemy combatants. The USA PATRIOT Act has nothing to do with indefinite detentions." He then gavelled the meeting to a close and walked out with the gavel. However Jerrold Nadler, a Democratic Congressman representing New York's 8th congressional district, and other witnesses continued speaking despite Sensenbrenner's departure, and C-SPAN cameras continued to roll after microphones in the hearing room had been turned off. According to The Washington Post, James J. Zogby, president of the Arab American Institute, complained that the action taken by the Chairman was "totally inappropriate — no mike on, and no record being kept" and that "I think as we are lecturing foreign governments about the conduct of their behavior with regard to opposition, I'm really troubled about what kind of message this is going to teach to other countries in the world about how they ought to conduct an open society that allows for an opposition with rights."

== Reauthorization legislative history ==
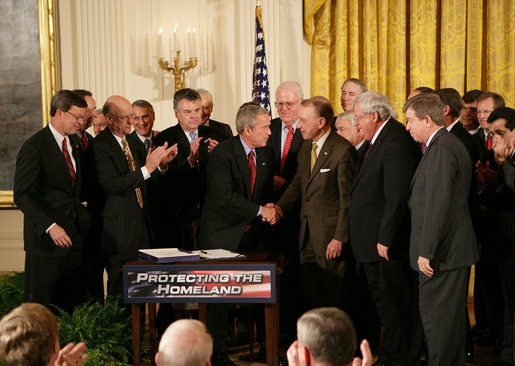
George W. Bush shakes hands with U.S. Senator Arlen Specter after signing H.R. 3199, the USA PATRIOT Improvement and Reauthorization Act of 2005.

In June 2005, the Select Committee on Intelligence met behind closed doors to consider a draft proposal by Senator Pat Roberts (R-KS) which, among other things, would have removed the primary purpose of FISA warrants issued ex parte and in camera to be for foreign intelligence. Instead, the warrants could also have been used for purposes unrelated to foreign intelligence. This was condemned by the ACLU, with ACLU Attorney Lisa Graves complained that the secret hearings into the draft was "an attempt to force the debate onto their terms, versus where the momentum has been headed, which is to roll back the Patriot Act to bring it in line with the Constitution and make sure its tools are focused on terrorists, as opposed to Americans."

The committee's proposed legislation was introduced into the House on July 21 as the USA PATRIOT and Terrorism Prevention Reauthorization Act of 2005. It repealed the sunset date for surveillance provisions of the Patriot Act — in other words, it would have made those sections permanent. A number of amendments were also proposed and passed. Several of the amendments were to surveillance provisions and included an amendment that added to the list of terrorist crimes that could be used for obtaining electronic surveillance, the requirement that the Director of the FBI must personally approve any library or bookstore requests by the FBI under section 215, making law enforcement report back to a court within 15 days of using the a roving wiretap and the narrowing of the scope for "sneak-and-peek" delayed notification search warrants. Several other amendments were related to NSLs, including allowing those in receipt of an NSL the ability to consult a lawyer and challenge it in court and preventing the penalization of NSL recipients who are mentally incompetent, under undue stress, under threat of bodily harm, or under a threat of being fired if they disclose they have been served an NSL. The NSL gag order reform originated from a floor proposal by then Congressman Jeff Flake. The reauthorization bill also included a provision that ordered the inspector general of the Justice Department to conduct annual reviews of PATRIOT Act investigative tools, including NSLs. Other amendments included standardizing penalties for terrorist attacks and other violence against railroad carriers and mass transportation systems on land, water, or in the air and clarifying the definition of terrorism in forfeiture laws. Congressman Howard Berman proposed an amendment that required a report to Congress on the development and use of data mining technology by departments and agencies of the Federal government. Other amendments were proposed to other areas not covered by the USA PATRIOT Act, for instance one amendment defined a new crime of "narco-terrorism," while another addressed crime and terrorism at U.S. seaports. The bill was passed 257-171 however when it was introduced into the Senate it was replaced by a bill proposed by Arlen Specter, S.1389. The Senate then requested a conference with the House.

The House responded on September 11 that they unanimously disagreed with the Senate amendment, and agreed to a conference. They then attempted to make a number of changes to the bill however it was not enough for Republican senators Larry Craig, John Sununu and Lisa Murkowski, and Democratic senators Dick Durbin, Russ Feingold and Ken Salazar, who wrote a letter threatening to block the bill if further changes were not made. The House duly proposed a House report, which was incorporated into a Conference report, which was then presented to the Senate. However, the Senate rejected the report, and on December 16 refused to end debate on legislation to renew the Act. A cloture motion was then ordered, but it failed, having fallen seven votes short of invoking closure on the matter, leaving the future of the Act in doubt. The vote went as follows: Fifty Republicans as well as two Democrats voted unsuccessfully to end debate; Five Republicans, 41 Democrats and one independent voted to block. With the sunsets threatening to expire, on December 21 the U.S. Senate came to a bipartisan agreement (S.2167) to extend by six months the expiring provisions of the Act. Under House rules, the House Judiciary Committee Chairman James Sensenbrenner had the authority to block enactment of the six-month extension. On the following day, the House rejected the six-month extension and voted for a one-month extension, which the Senate subsequently approved later that night. However, on February 1, the House voted to again extend the sunsets to March 10. The reauthorization Act was finally passed on March 2 by the Senate with a vote of 95–4, though this was opposed by Senator Feingold who unsuccessfully attempted to extend the sunsets. The House voted 280–138 in favour of authorizing the Act. Finally, on March 8, President Bush signed the reauthorization Act, declaring that "The Patriot Act has served America well, yet we cannot let the fact that America has not been attacked since September the 11th lull us into the illusion that the terrorist threat has disappeared" and that the White House would "continue to give [military law enforcement, homeland security and intelligence professionals] the tools to get the job done." However, after the ceremony, he issued a signing statement that "The executive branch shall construe the provisions of H.R. 3199 that call for furnishing information to entities outside the executive branch, such as sections 106A and 119, in a manner consistent with the President's constitutional authority to supervise the unitary executive branch and to withhold information the disclosure of which could impair foreign relations, national security, the deliberative processes of the Executive, or the performance of the Executive's constitutional duties" — in other words, he would not feel bound to comply with some of the provisions of the law if they conflicted with other Constitutional laws. This immediately drew a sharp rebuke from Senator Leahy, who condemned the statement as "nothing short of a radical effort to re-shape the constitutional separation of powers and evade accountability and responsibility for following the law ... The President's signing statements are not the law, and we should not allow them to be the last word. The President's constitutional duty is to faithfully execute the laws as written by the Congress. It is our duty to ensure, by means of congressional oversight, that he does so."

In November 2019, the House approved a three-month extension of the Patriot Act which would have expired on December 15, 2019. Democratic leadership included it as part of a bigger "must pass" spending bill which was approved by a vote of 231–192, mostly along party lines with Democrats voting in favor and Republicans voting against. Only ten Democrats voted against it. Representative Justin Amash (Independent) submitted an amendment to remove the Patriot Act provisions, but it was defeated by the Democratically controlled Rules committee.

== Judges strike key provisions ==
Although in the 2004 Doe v. Gonzalez case it was ruled that the NSL provisions of 18 U.S.C. § 2709 violated the First and Fourth Amendments of the U.S. Constitution, the Department of Justice had appealed against this decision. The reauthorization Act, however, modified the law and made judicial review a requirement of NSLs but never removed the permanent gag provision. Therefore, on September 6, 2007, U.S. District Judge Victor Marrero ruled that the use of NSLs to gain access to e-mail and telephone data from private companies for counter-terrorism investigations was "the legislative equivalent of breaking and entering, with an ominous free pass to the hijacking of constitutional values." The court struck down NSLs because the gag power was unconstitutional and courts could still not engage in meaningful judicial review of these gags.

Another provision struck down was the so-called "sneak and peek" provisions of the Patriot Act. These were struck down after the FBI wrongfully used the provision to arrest Portland attorney Brandon Mayfield on suspicions that he had been involved in the 2004 Madrid train bombings. They had concluded this wrongly because they believed that they found his fingerprint on a bag of detonators found at the scene. Agents seized three hard drives and ten DNA samples preserved on cotton swabs, and took 335 photos of personal items. Mayfield then filed a lawsuit against the U.S. Government, contending that his rights were violated by his arrest and by the investigation against him, and that the sneak and peek provisions were unconstitutional. The Government was forced to apologise to Mayfield and his family, stating that "[t]he United States acknowledges that the investigation and arrest were deeply upsetting to Mr. Mayfield, to Mrs. Mayfield, and to their three young children, and the United States regrets that it mistakenly linked Mr. Mayfield to this terrorist attack." However, Mayfield took it further and on September 26, 2007, judge Ann Aiken found that the searches violated the provision of the United States Fourth Amendment that prohibits unreasonable searches. Thus the law was declared unconstitutional, however, this was later overturned.
