= Nicholas Merrill =

American free speech and privacy advocate

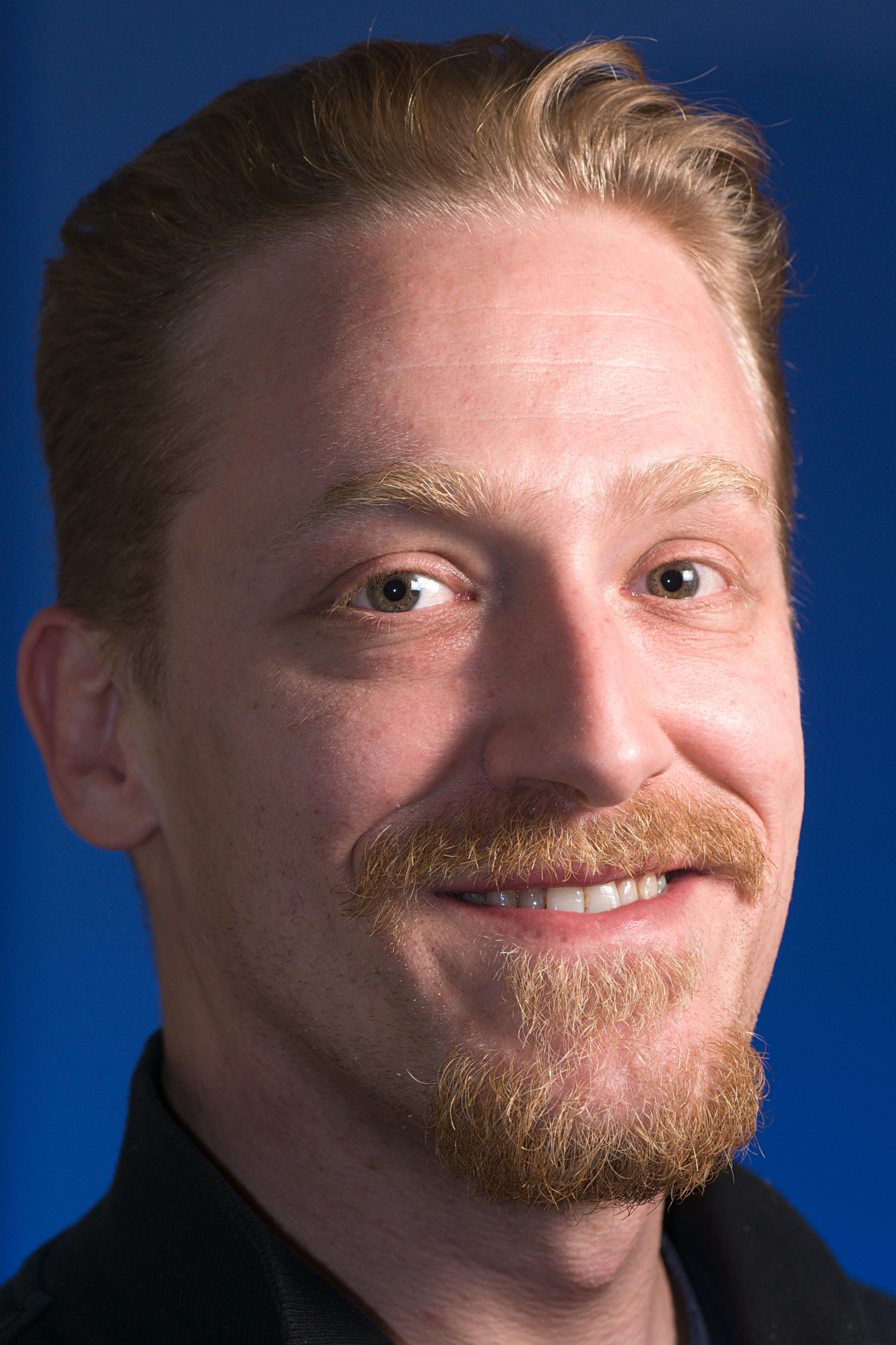
- Nicholas Merrill in 2010
- Born: New York, New York, U.S.
- Education: Hampshire College

Nicholas Merrill is an American system administrator, computer programmer, and entrepreneur. He is the founder of Calyx Internet Access, an Internet and hosted service provider founded in 1995, and of the non-profit Calyx Institute. He was the first person to file a constitutional challenge against the National Security Letters statute in the USA PATRIOT Act and consequently the first person to have a National Security Letter gag order completely lifted. In 2025, Merrill left the Calyx Institute and founded Phreeli, a privacy-focused cellular phone provider.

== Challenging the National Security Letter: Doe v. Ashcroft ==
After receiving a National Security Letter (NSL) from the FBI, he sued the FBI and Department of Justice and became the plaintiff in the lawsuit Doe v. Ashcroft (filed April 9, 2004 in the United States) filed on behalf of a formerly unknown ISP owner by the American Civil Liberties Union and the New York Civil Liberties Union against the U.S. federal government.

The letter—on FBI letterhead—requested that Merrill provide 16 categories of "electronic communication transactional records," including e-mail address, account number and billing information. Most of the other categories remain redacted by the FBI.

Merrill never complied with the FBI's National Security Letter request, and eventually—several years into the lawsuit—the FBI decided it no longer needed the information it had demanded and dropped its demand for records. However, for several years after dropping the demand, the FBI continued to prevent Merrill from publicly speaking about the NSL, consulting an attorney, or even from being publicly identified as the recipient of the NSL.

Because National Security Letters are accompanied by an open-ended, lifelong gag order, Merrill was unable to be identified in court papers as the plaintiff in the case and instead was referred to as "John Doe". As the years passed and the person who held the office of Attorney General changed, the case was renamed from Doe v. Ashcroft to Doe v. Gonzales, and then to Doe v. Mukasey, and finally Doe v. Holder. In fact, in 2007 The Washington Post made an exception to its policy against anonymous op-eds to publish an editorial by Merrill because of the gag order.

The case yielded two significant rulings. The first was a September 2004 district court decision that the national security letter statute was unconstitutional, which prompted Congress to amend the law to allow a recipient to challenge the demand for records and the gag order. The second was a December 2008 appeals court decision that held that parts of the amended gag provisions violated the First Amendment and that, to avoid this, the FBI must prove to a court that disclosure would harm national security in cases where the recipient resists the gag order.

On August 10, 2010, after more than six years, Nicholas Merrill was partially released from his gag order and allowed to reveal his identity, although he still could not reveal what information the FBI sought from him. This was three years after Merrill won The Roger Baldwin 'Medal of Liberty' award from the ACLU, which had to present the award to an empty chair at the time.

On September 14, 2015, 11 years after the initial NSL, a federal district court judge in New York fully lifted the gag order, allowing Merrill to speak freely about the contents of the NSL he received. On November 30, 2015, the unredacted ruling was published in full.

== Calyx Institute ==
Merrill subsequently founded the nonprofit Calyx Institute to provide education and research on privacy issues. The advisory board of the Calyx Institute has at various times included notable people in telecommunications, cryptography, privacy advocacy and computer security, including John Perry Barlow, Laura Poitras, Susan Herman, Bob Barr and Jason Snyder. It is a member of the torservers.net network which helps provide infrastructure for the Tor network including exit nodes, education for people seeking to provide Tor network technical support, and fundraising to support the Tor Project. One of the institute's projects is CalyxOS, which is a custom Android distribution using the principles of "privacy by design."

Merrill founded the Calyx Institute in 2010, a nonprofit focused on privacy and digital security tools and services, after gaining the ability to speak publicly about aspects of Doe vs. Ashcroft. From its founding in 2010, he served as the institute's executive director until stepping down in 2025 to devote more time to other projects and announced that Ellen McDermott would serve as the organization's interim executive director.

== Phreeli ==
In December 2025, Merrill launched Phreeli, a mobile virtual network operator marketed as a privacy-focused cellular provider designed to minimize the personal information it collects about subscribers. Phreeli’s signup process is designed to require only a ZIP code as a mandatory data point for tax purposes. All other information, such as an email address for account recovery, is optional and at the user’s discretion. Phreeli uses a type of zero-knowledge proof-based cryptography to confirm payment for an account to separate payment processing from ongoing phone-service records. The company also provides options to prepay service with privacy-focused cryptocurrencies including Zcash and Monero.

== Awards and appointments ==
- Roger Baldwin 'Medal of Liberty', 2007
- Bill of Rights Defense Committee 'Patriot Award', 2012
- PopTech 2012 Social Innovation Fellow

== See also ==
- National Security Letter
- USA PATRIOT Act
- Doe v. Ashcroft
