= Patriot Act (disambiguation) =

The Patriot Act, officially titled the USA PATRIOT Act, is a 2001 Act of the United States Congress.

Patriot Act may also refer to:

- Benjamin Franklin True Patriot Act, proposed legislation to review the USA PATRIOT Act
- Patriot Act: A Jeffrey Ross Home Movie, a 2005 documentary film
- "Patriot Act", a 2006 episode of the animated series Justice League Unlimited
- Patriot Act (novel), a 2007 thriller by Australian author James Phelan
- Patriot Act with Hasan Minhaj, a 2018–2020 Netflix comedy talk show
