= Calyx Institute =

U.S. nonprofit organization

The Calyx Institute
- Formation: May 2010
- Founders: Nicholas Merrill; Micah Anderson; Kobi Snitz
- Type: 501(c)(3)
- Tax ID no.: 27-2800937
- Headquarters: Brooklyn, New York
- Products: CalyxOS, CalyxVPN, Calyx Mobile Hotspots
- Executive Director: Elizabeth Eagen
- Revenue: $1,615,118 (2019)
- Expenses: $1,476,960 (2019)
- Website: calyxinstitute.org

The Calyx Institute is a New York-based 501(c)(3) research and education nonprofit organization formed to make privacy and digital security more accessible. It was founded in 2010 by Nicholas Merrill, Micah Anderson, and Kobi Snitz.

== History ==
The Calyx Institute was founded on May 19, 2010, through a filing with the New York Department of State. Its original office consisted of a single desk in a law firm in Manhattan.

In 2011, Calyx was described in an article in The New York Times and also entered into the Congressional Record as a new non-profit that "aims to study how to protect consumers' privacy". The same year, The Washington Post described it as an organization that "promotes 'best practices' with regard to privacy and freedom of expression in the telecommunications industry" In April 2012, Declan McCullagh at CNET published an in-depth profile of the Institute and its plans to develop best practices and proof-of-concept software for running a privacy-focused internet service provider and phone company. The following month, the security publication CSO Online described the organization's plan as: "By showing there is a market demand for privacy, The Calyx Institute hopes to nudge telecoms in a positive direction and intends to 'release all software developed under an open source model as well as all underlying policies and network designs.'"

On December 4, 2014, the Calyx Institute received its 501(c)(3) determination letter from the IRS, giving it the status of "public charity" and making donations to it tax deductible to the extent allowed by law.

In 2017, it moved from Manhattan to Brooklyn, renting office space in the Industry City development.

In 2020, the Calyx Institute was a signer of an open letter asking Google to be more transparent regarding user data being shared with law enforcement.

In 2025, founder Nicholas Merrill left the organization to pursue other projects.

In 2026, Elizabeth Eagen was appointed as new executive director.

== Leadership ==
The Calyx Institute's board of directors originally consisted of Nicholas Merrill, Micah Anderson, and Kobi Snitz; in 2016, attorney Carey Shenkman joined the board.

The Institute also has an advisory board, which as of January 2022 consists of Enrique Piracés, Isabela Bagueros, Jonathan Askin, Matt Mitchell, Sandra Ordoñez, and Sascha Meinrath. Past advisors included Brian Snow, Susan N. Herman, John Perry Barlow, and Bob Barr.

== Funding ==
The majority of the Calyx Institute's funding comes from its membership program. In its early years it received minor funding from Internews, the Wau Holland Foundation, the Ford Foundation, and NLnet.

DuckDuckGo donated $2,500 in 2017 to support Calyx's mission, and the following year selected it as a participating organization in its Privacy Challenge crowdfunding campaign, through which it raised over $18,000.

The Calyx Institute accepts donations in Bitcoin, which allows anonymity, but requires an email address for acknowledgement if desired.

In December 2022, the Calyx Institute announced it was awarded a $1 million grant from Jack Dorsey's #startsmall philanthropy.

== Grantmaking ==
The Calyx Institute has given grants and other financial assistance to a number of organizations and projects including CryptoHarlem, MuckRock's Hacking History project, and the Surveillance Technology Oversight Project.

== Tools ==
- CalyxOS is a fork of the Android Open Source Project that aims to give users better privacy and control over their personal data.
- SeedVault is an open-source data backup application for Android. Calyx Institute is credited for LineageOS including SeedVault backup.
- Datura is an open-source firewall application built in CalyxOS for controlling the per-app network access.
- Calyx Institute runs CalyxVPN, a free VPN service that does not require an email address or any personally identifiable information from the user. It is based on an open-source system called LEAP, which uses OpenVPN.
- In January 2014, The Calyx Institute announced it had set up a new XMPP chat service, Calyx XMPP Service, at that time unique in forcing the use of end-to-end encryption using off-the-record messaging and leveraging DNSSEC and DANE as well as making itself accessible as a Tor hidden service.
- In 2015, a coalition of organizations consisting of the EFF, the Freedom of the Press Foundation, NYU Law, the Calyx Institute, and the Berkman Center created a website called Canary Watch in order to provide a compiled list of all companies providing warrant canaries, with prompt updates of any changes in a canary's state. It is often difficult for users to ascertain a canary's validity on their own and thus Canary Watch aimed to provide a simple display of all active canaries and any blocks of time that they were not active.

== Conferences ==
The Calyx Institute has participated multiple times in the DEF_CON hacker conference and the HOPE conference, and has also participated in the Hackers Next Door conference.

It has also sponsored and presented at the Internet Freedom Festival.

== Reception ==
The Calyx Institute's membership program provides mobile Internet access as a benefit. This was recommended in September 2016 by Cory Doctorow in an article in Boing Boing entitled "I have found a secret tunnel that runs underneath the phone companies and emerges in paradise", and in January 2017 by Jake Swearingen in New York Magazine.

Since 2013, the Calyx Institute has been cited as an example of Internet users' being interested in protecting their privacy and related to Merrill's successful challenge of a national security letter. Its Internet offerings have been called "an exception not the norm".

In 2019, several Calyx Institute servers were included in a study of the oldest, longest-running Tor exit nodes.

In a 2021 review of CalyxVPN, TechRadar called Calyx Institute a "long established non-profit" and said it was unusual in being "powered by donations" without ads and using open-source software.
