= XS4ALL =

Dutch Internet service provider

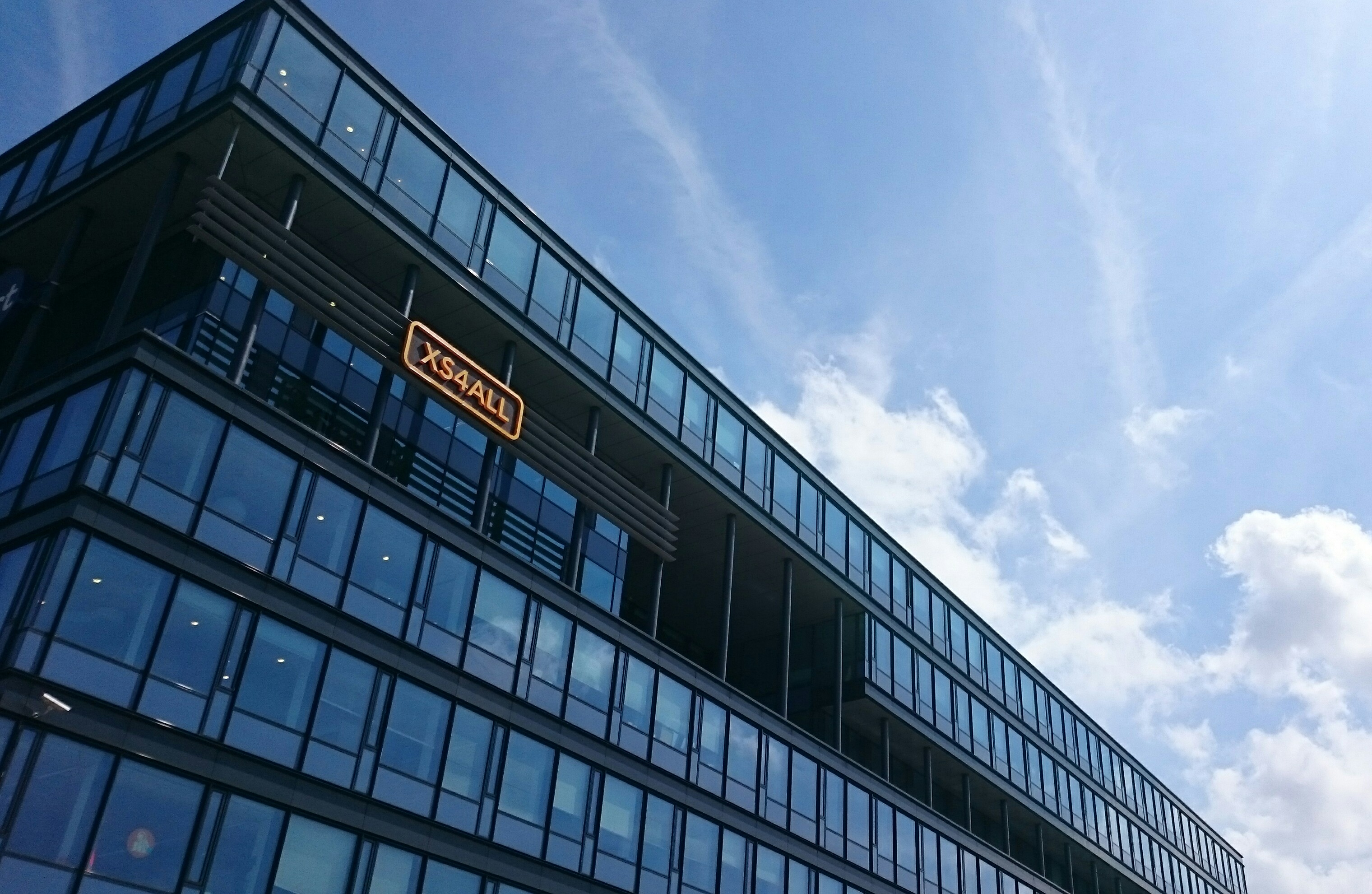
- XS4ALL office at Sloterdijk, Amsterdam
- Industry: Internet service provider
- Predecessor: Hacktic Net
- Founder: Felipe Rodriquez; Rop Gonggrijp; Paul Jongsma; Cor Bosman
- Defunct: 2022
- Headquarters: Netherlands, Amsterdam
- Services: Internet, TV and Telephone
- Parent: N/A (1993-1998); KPN (1998-2022)
- Website: https://www.xs4all.nl/en/

Logo as of 2004

XS4ALL was an Internet service provider (ISP) in the Netherlands. It was founded in 1993 as an offshoot of the hackers club Hack-Tic by Felipe Rodriquez, Rop Gonggrijp, Paul Jongsma and Cor Bosman, while based in Amsterdam. It was the sixth provider in the Netherlands (after NLnet, SURFnet, HCC!hobbynet, Knoware and IAF) and the second company to offer Internet access to private individuals. Initially only offering dial-in services via modem and ISDN, it later expanded to offer dial-up access as well as ADSL, VDSL, and fiber-optic (FTTH) services as well as mobile internet (but no calling or texting). The name is a play on the English pronunciation of access for all.

As of 2007, XS4ALL was one of the larger ISPs in The Netherlands. In 2005, the company had a turnover of 86.1 million euro, realising a 15.4 million euro profit before taxes. Also in 2005, XS4ALL employed 327 people (325 FTE) and served 265,000 private subscribers. The company is known for its willingness to take on controversial issues; has taken legal action against spammers, and fought over other legal issues in court, such as Scientology vs. the Internet.

XS4ALL was sold to KPN in December 1998, but remained an independent subsidiary. In January 2019, KPN announced that it would eventually phase out the XS4ALL brand and continue operations under the KPN brand. KPN stopped offering services with the XS4ALL brand name on 24 December 2021, and will migrate existing customers to KPN infrastructure during 2022.

A petition and a special action commission was started to try to revert this decision, the petition has been signed over 50,000 times, signatories include ex-board members and founders of XS4ALL. In November 2019 the committee launched a new company named Freedom Internet, meant to serve as an ideological successor to XS4ALL, and supported by a crowdfunding action that raised 2.5 million euro. Freedom Internet initially offers e-mail hosting, and rolled out its first DSL connections in 2020.

== Activism and controversies ==
=== Scientology ===
In 1995 members of the Church of Scientology caused a raid on the servers of Dutch Internet provider XS4ALL as part of a bigger conflict with its online critics and sued it and Karin Spaink for copyright violations because of citing out of some confidential materials of Scientology. A summary judgment followed in 1995, full proceedings in 1999, an appeal in 2001 which has been upheld by the Supreme Court of Netherlands in December 2005, all in favor of the provider and Karin Spaink, putting freedom of speech above copyright in some cases. From these days there is also a relationship with NGO Bits of Freedom, an organisation promoting Freedom of Speech: BoF was a strong supporter for Karin in her fight with Scientology. A video appeared from anonymous featuring the office building of XS4ALL.

=== Station B92 ===
In December 1996, XS4ALL put the Belgrade radio station B92 online using streaming audio technology in response to the jamming of its broadcasts by the regime of Slobodan Milošević. XS4ALL installed a leased line to the radio station in response to a request from Adriënne van Heteren, a Dutch citizen who went to Belgrade to set up various cultural activities. After XS4ALL had launched the online broadcast of Radio B92, its signal was picked up by the Voice of America and BBC World Service and transmitted back into Serbia, where it was then also transmitted via several local radio-stations.

=== Radikal magazine ===
In September 1996, members of the German InternetContentTaskForce (ICTF) blocked XS4ALL for about a month because one of its subscribers had put an issue of radikal magazine on his homepage. radikal is illegal in Germany, and to prevent its publication the German Bundesanwaltschaft (prosecutor's office) ordered commercial ISPs in Germany to block its website. They ended up blocking the entire XS4ALL site, which at the time had about 6,000 personal and commercial homepages. XS4ALL insisted that the case be settled by the courts, because it did not want to infringe on its customers' rights of free expression; however, the requests to follow traditional legal paths were ignored by the German ICTF.

On 11 April 1997 one of the largest German ISPs, the Deutsches Forschungsnetz (DFN) academic backbone network, started an IP-filtering blockade against XS4ALL. Many protest letters were sent, mirrors were once again set up around the world, and the complete issue of radikal 154 was posted in the newsgroup "de.soc.zensur". As a result, the blockade only lasted a few days. The founders of XS4ALL were interrogated as suspects of publication of terrorist propaganda, but no legal actions were initiated against them. XS4ALL then implemented several technologies to sabotage the censorship attempt, such as automatically rotating the IP address of its website. The ICTF ended up censoring all IP traffic to the XS4ALL domain, including e-mail. After a couple of weeks this became untenable; a global protest against the censorship emerged, and a global network of mirror sites was created by the online community. The ICTF abandoned its efforts after several weeks.

=== Arab Spring in Egypt and Libya ===
In early 2011 the government in Egypt blocked (initially international, later all) internet-access hoping to thwart organizers of protests against the government and also to control the news leaving the country. On an incoming requests XS4All opened up their—still existing—dial-in modems to give people from Egypt direct access to the open internet. Because international telephone connections from Egypt to the rest of the world were not blocked, people could dial into the modems in Amsterdam and from there subsequently log into the internet using username and password xs4all. When later that year a similar situation arose in Libya, the possibilities of such connections were brought to the attention of protesters in that country.

== Corporate culture ==
In December 1998, XS4ALL was sold to the Dutch incumbent phone company KPN. Many of the original employees, especially system managers, still work there.

XS4ALL also sponsors and hosts the sites of many free software projects, like Python, Squirrelmail and Debian. It sponsors the data traffic of ScriptumLibre, and thereby indirectly helps projects like Foundation for a Free Information Infrastructure (FFII) and the Free Software Translation Project.
