= Rop Gonggrijp =

Dutch hacker (born 1968)

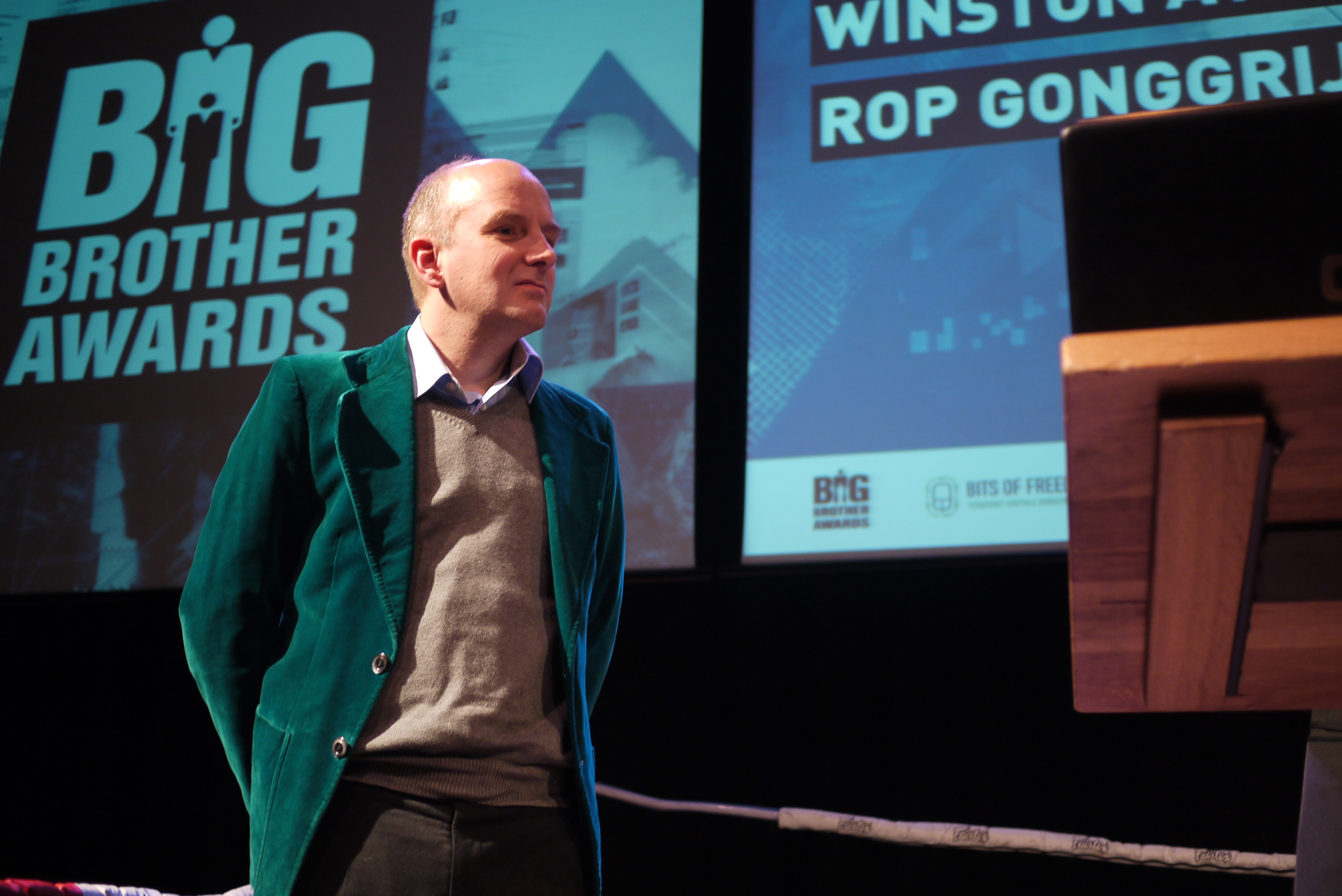
- Gonggrijp at the Big Brother awards
- Born: 14 February 1968 (age 58); Amsterdam
- Known for: XS4ALL, Hack-Tic, "We Don't Trust Voting Computers"

Robbert (Rop) Valentijn Gonggrijp (born 14 February 1968) is a Dutch hacker and one of the founders of XS4ALL.

== Biography ==
Gonggrijp was born in Amsterdam. While growing up in Wormer in the Dutch Zaanstreek area, he became known as a teenage hacker and appeared as one of the main characters in Jan Jacobs's book Kraken en Computers (Hacking and computers, Veen uitgevers 1985, ISBN 90-204-2651-6) which describes the early hacker scene in the Netherlands. Moved to Amsterdam in 1988. Founded the hacker magazine Hack-Tic in 1989. He was believed to be a major security threat by authorities in the Netherlands and the United States. In the masthead of Hack-Tic, Gonggrijp described his role as hoofdverdachte ('prime suspect'). He was convinced that the Internet would radically alter society.

In 1993, a number of people surrounding Hack-Tic including Gonggrijp founded XS4ALL, the first ISP that offered access to the Internet for private individuals in the Netherlands. Gonggrijp sold the company to Dutch-Telecom KPN in 1997. After he left XS4ALL, Gonggrijp founded ITSX, a computer security evaluation company, which was bought by Madison Gurkha in 2006. In 2001, Gonggrijp started work on the Cryptophone, a mobile telephone that can encrypt conversations.

Since 1989, Gonggrijp has been the main organizer of hacker events held every four years.

Throughout the years, he has repeatedly shown his concerns about the increasing amount of information on individuals that government agencies and companies have access to. Rop held a talk titled "We lost the war" at the Chaos Communication Congress 2005 in Berlin together with Frank Rieger.

In 2006 he founded the organisation "Wij vertrouwen stemcomputers niet" ("We do not trust voting computers") which campaigns against the use of electronic voting systems without a Voter Verified Paper Audit Trail and which showed in October 2006 on Dutch television how an electronic voting machine from manufacturer Nedap could easily be hacked. These findings were taken seriously both by the Dutch government and by international election observers.

Gonggrijp has worked for WikiLeaks, helping prepare the Collateral Murder April 2010 release of video footage from a Baghdad airstrike that killed civilians, including two Reuters journalists.

On 14 December 2010, in relation to ongoing investigations of WikiLeaks, the US Department of Justice issued a subpoena ordering Twitter to release information regarding Gonggrijp's account as well as those of Julian Assange, Chelsea Manning, Birgitta Jónsdóttir, Jacob Appelbaum and all 637,000 users following @wikileaks.

According to Gonggrijp, the reason is his assistance in enabling WikiLeaks to release the "Collateral Murder" video in April 2010, a WikiLeaks action.
