= American Civil Liberties Union v. Ashcroft =

Lawsuit

American Civil Liberties Union v. Ashcroft (filed April 9, 2004 in the United States) is a lawsuit filed on behalf of a formerly unknown Internet Service Provider (ISP) company under the pseudonym John Doe, Inc. by the American Civil Liberties Union against the U.S. federal government, by the Department of Justice under former U.S. attorney general John Ashcroft.

In 2010, it was revealed that John Doe was in fact Nicholas Merrill of Calyx Internet Access. Merrill was subject to National Security Letters (NSLs) from the Federal Bureau of Investigation requiring the release of private information and under a gag order forbidding any public discussion of the issues. In September 2004, Judge Victor Marrero of the United States District Court for the Southern District of New York struck down the NSL provisions of the USA PATRIOT Act. This prompted Congress to amend the law to allow limited judicial review of NSLs, and prompted the government to appeal the case to the United States Court of Appeals for the Second Circuit. The appeal was dismissed by Doe I v. Gonzales, 449 F.3d 415 (2d Cir. 2006) because Congress amended Section 2709 in the USA PATRIOT Improvement and Reauthorization Act of 2005.

On the recommendation of the Second Circuit, the district court considered the amended law in 2007, in Doe v. Gonzales. On September 6, 2007, Judge Marrero struck down the NSL provision of the revised Act, ruling that even with limited judicial review granted in the amended law, it was still a violation of separation of powers under the United States Constitution and the First Amendment. This is not yet enforced, pending a possible government appeal.

== Challenge of the lawsuit and arguments ==
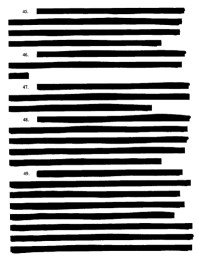
A heavily redacted page from the original lawsuit

Because of the secrecy rules involved, the government would not let the ACLU disclose they had even filed a case for nearly a month, after which they were permitted to release a heavily redacted version of the complaint (shown right). According to government secrecy rules (the National Security Letter provision, [Section 2709] of the 1986 Electronic Communications Privacy Act, [ECPA]) the ACLU still could not disclose which ISP was served with the request to produce documents.

This prompted the ACLU to challenge the secrecy law itself, and they sued to invalidate the NSL provision of the ECPA. Introduced by U.S. Senator Patrick Leahy of Vermont and enacted in 1986, the bill permitted the FBI to obtain customer records from telephone and Internet companies in terrorism investigations.

The ACLU argued that the NSL violated the First and Fourth Amendments to the United States Constitution because

- Section 2709 failed to spell out any legal process whereby a telephone or Internet company could try to oppose an NSL subpoena in court and
- Section 2709 prohibited the recipient of an NSL subpoena from disclosing that he had received such a request from the FBI, and outweighs the FBI's need for secrecy in counter-terrorism investigations.

The government agreed in principle with the ACLU's claim that the recipient of the subpoena can challenge it in court, and because the matter of specified judicial process remained in question and directly affected other present and future cases, the Court found the NSL section to be in need of review.

== Court finding ==
The Court subsequently found section 2709 of the Electronic Communications Privacy Act unconstitutional. It reasoned that it could not find in the provision an implied right for the person receiving the subpoena to challenge it in court as is constitutionally required.

The finding of unconstitutionality essentially dismisses any claimed presumptive legal need for absolute secrecy in regard to terrorism cases. The USA PATRIOT Act is affected only if the limits on NSLs in terrorism cases also apply to non-terrorism cases such as those authorized by the Act. The government was expected to appeal the ruling to the Supreme Court, and until the district court ruling is reviewed, the secrecy procedures of the NSL remain in place.

== 2010 – Partial lift of gag order ==
On August 10, 2010, after 6 years Nicholas Merrill was partially released from his gag order and allowed to reveal his identity, although he could not reveal what information the FBI sought from him. This was 3 years after Merrill won a 'liberty award' from the ACLU, which had to present the award to an empty chair at the time. Merrill has since founded the nonprofit Calyx Institute to provide education and research on privacy issues.

== 2015 – Full lift of gag order ==
On September 14, 2015, 11 years after the initial NSL, a federal district court judge in New York fully lifted the gag order, allowing Merrill to speak freely about the contents of the NSL he received. The court order went into effect 90 days after the initial ruling, to allow the government time to appeal the decision if it wished.

== See also ==
- Warrant canary
