= CryptoHarlem =

U.S. nonprofit organization

- Formation: 2013
- Founders: Matt Mitchell
- Founded at: New York, New York
- Headquarters: New York
- Products: anti-surveillance, cybersecurity education and advocacy
- Founder: Matt Mitchell
- Website: cryptoharlem.com

CryptoHarlem is an anti-surveillance, cybersecurity education and advocacy organization. Founded by Matt Mitchell in 2013, CryptoHarlem provides the predominantly African American community in upper Manhattan with free workshops on digital security, encryption, privacy, cryptography, digital policing and surveillance.

== History ==
CryptoHarlem was founded following the Trayvon Martin murder trial. Initially a series of security workshops, Mitchell said he founded the organization “due to the feeling of profound loss, the loss of all black folks, after Trayvon Martin’s death.” Monthly digital privacy clinics called "crypto parties" hosted by Mitchell and CryptoHarlem started in 2012.

In 2017 the organization's name appeared as an Easter egg in an episode of Mr. Robot.

In 2017, CryptoHarlem developed an open source tool to help organizations prepare for data breaches. The now-defunct site hosting the tool, ProtectYour.Org, was supported by the Mozilla Fellowship and the Ford Foundation. Calyx Institute has sponsored CryptoHarlem and its Crypto Parties since 2019.

The ACLU and CryptoHarlem have worked together on issues related to surveillance and privacy legislation, including the Public Oversight of Surveillance Technology Act of 2020.

In 2021, Newsweek profiled Mitchell and CryptoHarlem as one of "America's greatest disruptors" for their work against "digital stop and frisk". The Electronic Frontier Foundation awarded Mitchell and CryptoHarlem with a Pioneer Award and hosted a discussion of their work.

In 2022, Mitchell, representing CryptoHarlem, was an invited speaker on "Easy Fixes for Algorithmic Bias" at The Barnard College Diversity in Computing Speaker Series.
