= Mark Stephens (solicitor) =

English solicitor

Mark Stephens CBE
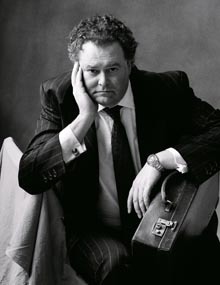
- Stephens in 2011
- Born: 7 April 1957 (age 69); Old Windsor, Berkshire, England
- Education: North East London Polytechnic; Vrije Universiteit
- Occupation: Solicitor
- Known for: Consultant, Howard Kennedy, Former Chair of Design and Artists Copyright Society, University of East London, Board of the Independent Schools Inspectorate Chair of Internews. Past President of the Commonwealth Lawyers Association. Writing and Broadcasting.

Mark Howard Stephens CBE (born 7 April 1957) is an English solicitor who specialises in media law, intellectual property, freedom of expression, and human rights. He came to public attention for representing James Hewitt during reports of Hewitt’s alleged relationship with Diana, Princess of Wales. In 2010, Stephens served as legal counsel for Julian Assange, founder of WikiLeaks, in relation to extradition proceedings to Sweden. He is also the founder of the law firm Howard Kennedy LLP, which has acted for a range of clients in media and entertainment law.

== Personal life and education ==
Stephens was born in Old Windsor, Berkshire, on 7 April 1957. His father was an artist and his mother a secretary and later on a social worker. He attended St Paul's Secondary Modern School and Strode's Grammar School, followed by the Cambridge Manor Academy for Dramatic Arts, before going on to study law at North East London Polytechnic. He went on to study European Community Law at the Vrije Universiteit in Brussels and before being admitted as a Solicitor of the Supreme Court in England and Wales in July 1982. He married Donna Coote in 1982 and they have three daughters.

== Legal career ==
=== 1982–1992 ===
In 1983, with Roslyn Innocent, he established Stephens Innocent, a law firm specializing in visual arts and intellectual property.

In February 1991, Stephens was acting as a solicitor for the National Union of Mineworkers (NUM) when John Hendy, Geoffrey Robertson, and two other QCs defended Arthur Scargill and Peter Heathfield against claims that they had handled funds inappropriately during the miner's strike of 1984–85. In 1992, he worked on a case brought by the NUM against the government that saw an earlier decision to close 31 coal mines overturned after it was deemed unlawful.

When allegations of an affair between James Hewitt and Diana, Princess of Wales, were published by The Sun in 1992, Stephens claimed through the Press Association he had issued proceedings against the newspaper for defamation even though he had not actually served the writ. Princess Diana later admitted the affair on television.

=== 1993–1999 ===
In 1993, Stephens helped the MP Clive Soley to draft a parliamentary bill on press regulation. Stephens commented that people thrust into the public eye needed protection from the press, but that "astronomical" fines would be needed to be able to achieve this. According to The Guardian, in 1995, his public profile was further raised by defending Greenpeace against litigation brought by Shell over an alleged illegal occupation of the Brent Spar oil platform.

Stephens provided pro bono assistance to two activists: Helen Steel and David Morris, who had handed out leaflets stating "What's wrong with McDonald's?" in 1985 and they were subsequently tried for libel. The case began in 1990 and became the longest-running court case in UK history. After the defendants were fined £60,000, he took their case to the ECHR in 2004, where they successfully appealed the fine.

=== 2000–2009 ===
In August 2000, Stephens was retained by heavyweight boxing champion Mike Tyson for a hearing before the British Boxing Board of Control. The disciplinary hearing of 2 counts relating to Tyson's behavior after his 38-second victory over Lou Savarese in Glasgow in June that year, Tyson escaped a ban from fighting in Britain. Tyson was acquitted on one charge, but convicted and fined on the other count.

In January and December 2002 Stephens was retained by the Washington Post to represent its veteran war correspondent, Jonathan Randal, in The Hague at the United Nations Court, the International Criminal Tribunal for the former Yugoslavia, establishing the principle of qualified privilege for the protection of journalists in war crimes courts.

In early 2007, hired by aboriginal lawyer Michael Mansell, Stephens launched proceedings for the Tasmanian Aborigines to recover 15 sets of their stolen ancestral remains at the Natural History Museum in London although the case was not seen through to completion. He accused the museum of wishing to retain them for "genetic prospecting".

In 2008, he won an apology from a former police driver who had written "appalling lies" about the novelist and essayist Sir Salman Rushdie regarding the book The Satanic Verses. One allegation was that Rushdie had profited from the fatwa issued against him after publishing The Satanic Verses.

=== 2010 onwards ===
January 2010 brought the first case– known colloquially as the alphabet soup case – in the (then) new UK Supreme Court. Stephens represented several media organizations and argued that the names of several people who were accused of funding terrorist organizations should have their anonymity stripped. The judges agreed with the media and ruled that the names should be released, noting that anonymity orders had become "deeply ingrained" in court cases in the UK.

In 2010, Stephens began to defend the founder of WikiLeaks, Julian Assange, against extradition to Sweden. Soon after the WikiLeaks cables disclosure began, Stephens told The Guardian that he thought he was being monitored by the security services and that his home was being watched. In January 2011, Stephens claimed that United States authorities were trying to develop a criminal case against Assange, citing a subpoena against Twitter issued by the United States Department of Justice to demand private information on Assange and other people associated with WikiLeaks. The Guardian reported that Assange ended his relationship with Stephens after he accused Finers Stephens Innocent of withholding a £412,000 advance for his autobiography to cover legal fees. Assange accused them of "extreme overcharging" which Finers Stephens Innocent denied. The firm sued Assange in January 2012 to recover fees.

In July 2011, it was reported that Stephens had been one of a group of high-profile lawyers who may have been the victim of the News International phone hacking scandal.

== Other works ==
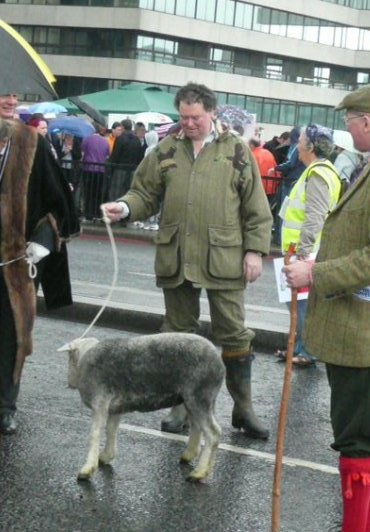
Stephens exercising his right as a Freeman of the City of London, by driving a sheep over London Bridge in 2009

Stephens has held many charitable, regulatory, government and academic appointments. He is also a Freeman of the City of London. In 1986, he was appointed the treasurer of the North East London Law Society, and in 1989 was elected to the committee becoming their President. Stephens was on ICSTIS' (a premium telephone line regulator) emergency committee, but resigned in 1996, after it emerged he had not disclosed a possible conflict of interest. Later that year, Stephens was appointed the first Chair of the Policy board of the Internet Watch Foundation and became the vice-chairman on the merger of the Policy and Management Boards. He is currently a trustee of Index on Censorship, Chair of the International Advisory Board of the Media Legal Defence Initiative, the postgraduate course in comparative media law and social policy at Oxford University, the Solicitors Pro bono Group (now, LawWorks), and the International Bar Association's Human Rights Institute and Media Law Committee.

Stephens sits on the Advisory Boards of Oxford University's Program in Comparative Media Law & Social Policy, at Wolfson College, Oxford, the University of Hong Kong Media Law Course and Indiana University's Center for International Media Law and Policy Studies.

On 1 April 2006, Stephens was appointed to be a trustee of the International Law Book Facility, a charitable organization whose goal it is to donate law books to improve access to legal information/access to justice where there is a need.

From 2003 to 2007, Stephens was a member of the board of governors of Rose Bruford College of Theatre & Performance.

In August 2009 he was appointed Chairman of the Governors at the University of East London and in October 2010 as Chair of the Contemporary Art Society.

He was appointed by the Secretary of State for Foreign and Commonwealth Affairs to be a member of the Foreign and Commonwealth Office's Free Expression Advisory Board; in January 2010, he was appointed to a working group on libel laws, set up by the then Justice Secretary, Jack Straw, which published a report in March 2010. Stephens is currently serving on the Executive Committee of the Commonwealth Lawyers Association and was elected President of its Council at the Cape Town Conference in April 2013.

In January 2011, Stephens was asked to Judge the documentary Current Affairs – International category 2009-2010 and was invited back in January 2012 to judge the same category for the Royal Television Society.

In October 2011, Stephens was appointed as the new Chair of the Design and Artists Copyright Society (DACS). Stephens was instrumental in the establishment of DACS in 1984 – law firm Stephens Innocent was a home to DACS in the first years after its establishment.

On 7 November 2011, Stephens was appointed to the board of the Independent Schools Inspectorate.

Stephens has become a patron of International Alert the independent peace building organization that works to lay the foundations for lasting peace and security in communities affected by violent conflict.

Most recently, Stephens has become a member of the legal panel of the Human Dignity Trust and a trustee on the UK board of the international media development organization Internews.

== Publishing ==
Stephens has contributed to seven books: Miscarriages of Justice: a review of justice in error (1999), International Libel and Privacy Handbook all four editions (2005), (2009), (2013), (2016) published by Bloomberg Press, La Presunción de Inocenicia Y Los Juicios Paralelos (2013) published by Wolters Kluwer (Spain) for the Fundación Fernando Pombo/Universidad Internacional Menéndez Pelayo., Media Law & Ethics in the 21st Century (2014) published by Palgrave MacMillan, This is not a book about Gavin Turk (2014) published by Trolley Books, Media Law and Policy in the Internet Age (2016) published by Hart an imprint of Bloomsbury Publishing, Media Law International (3rd Edition) - Specialist Guide for Global Leaders in Media Law Practice (2016) published by Media Law International.

He is also on the editorial boards of Communications Lawyer, Copyright World and European Intellectual Property Review.

== Recognition ==
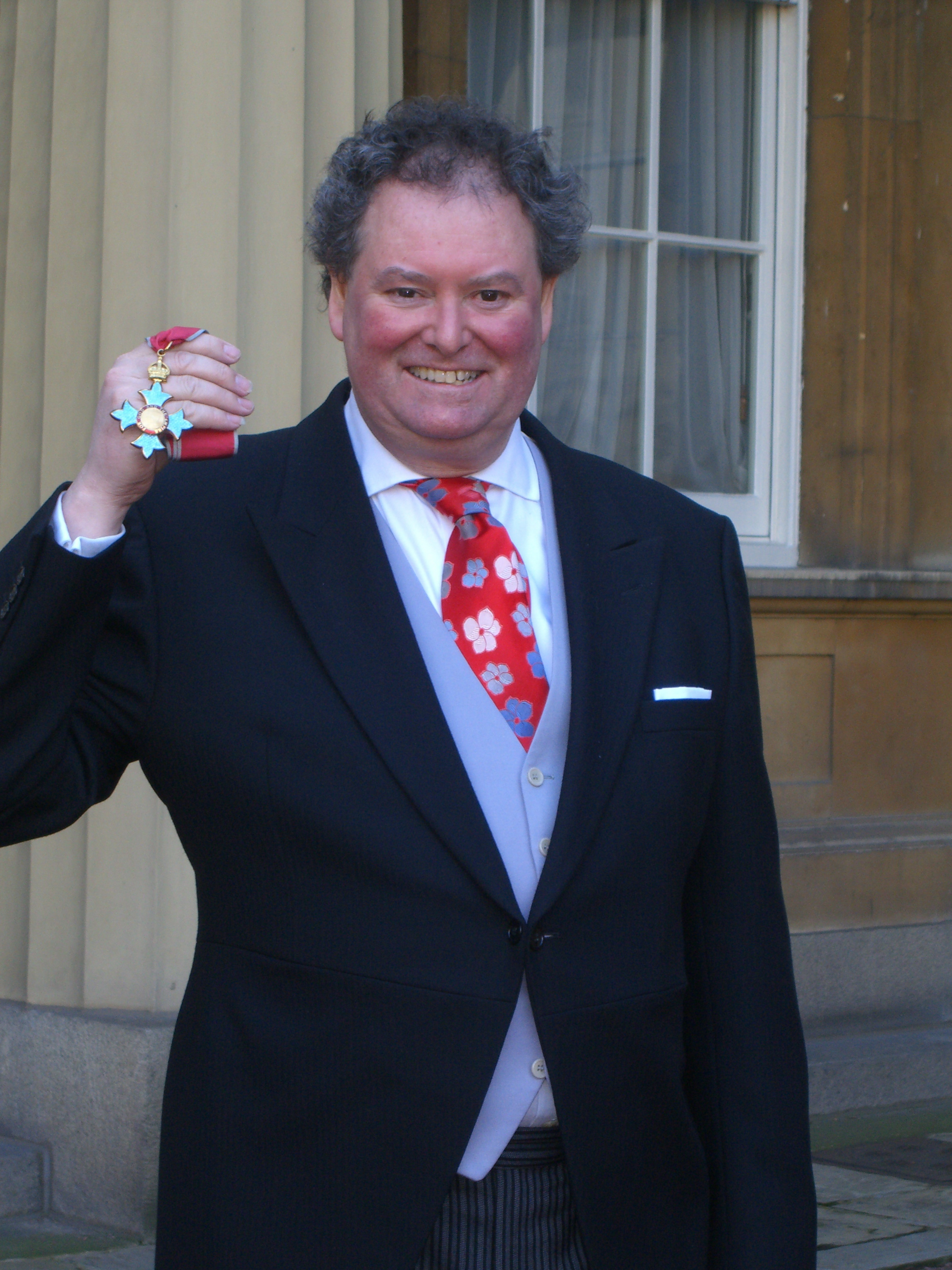
Mark Stephens after receiving his CBE in January 2012

In 2001, Stephens was awarded an honorary doctorate in law by the University of East London. He was appointed Commander of the Order of the British Empire (CBE) in the 2011 Birthday Honors for services to the legal professions and the arts.
