= Security and Freedom Ensured Act =

The Security and Freedom Enhancement (SAFE) Act (H.R. 1526) is legislation proposed by Senators Larry Craig (R-ID), John E. Sununu (R-NH) and Richard Durbin (D-IL) which would add checks and balances to the USA PATRIOT Act. This legislation, which was introduced in the House on April 6, 2005, would curtail some powers of the USA PATRIOT Act by requiring court reviews and reporting requirements.

The SAFE Act would also revise the definition of "terrorist" to exclude certain groups of people such as anti-war protesters and abortion demonstrators.

This legislation was introduced to provide an alternative to the USA PATRIOT Act that some felt was too overreaching in its effort to fight terrorism.

== Reception ==
Some groups, such as The Heritage Foundation, condemned the SAFE Act for threatening the safety of Americans. Others, such as the Electronic Frontier Foundation, praised the legislation for protecting civil liberties.
