= Benjamin Franklin True Patriot Act =

2003–04 United States bill

The Benjamin Franklin True Patriot Act (H.R. 3171) is a bill introduced in the United States House of Representatives intended to review the previously passed USA PATRIOT Act. The bill was referred to subcommittees where it languished without action taken before the end of the 108th United States Congress. The bill will have to be reintroduced in order to be considered again.

== Overview ==
The bill was sponsored by Representatives Dennis Kucinich (D-Ohio) and Ron Paul (R-Texas), with 27 co-sponsors, all Democrats except for Ron Paul. The intent was to review the USA PATRIOT Act to make sure it does not "inappropriately undermine civil liberties." Its name, as described in Sec. 2, No. 1, refers to Benjamin Franklin's famous quote, "Those who would give up Essential Liberty, to purchase a little temporary Safety, deserve neither Liberty nor Safety."

The act had the goal of creating a 90-day review period in which parts of Sections 4-10 of the USA PATRIOT Act could be removed. These aspects would include: the use of roving wiretaps, secret record searches, detention and deportation of noncitizens, monitoring of religious institutions and the requirement that airport baggage screeners be U.S. citizens. This bill was presented to the House on September 24, 2003, and was referred to subcommittees for consideration. No action was taken before the end of the 108th Congress.

== Support ==
The proposed bill enjoyed rare support from both the left as well as right-leaning libertarians due to concerns that the USA PATRIOT Act had gone too far in removing essential freedoms and civil liberties. In addition to members of Congress, the proposed bill had many high-profile supporters, including the American Civil Liberties Union (ACLU), the NAACP and a number of groups in the Jewish community. Sponsors admitted they didn't expect the bill to pass, but maintain it was brought up to encourage debate about the issues surrounding the controversial Patriot Act. A number of cities, including San Francisco, had already passed measures condemning the Patriot Act.
