= Doe v. Gonzales =

2004 US lawsuit

John Doe v. Alberto R. Gonzales
- Court: United States Court of Appeals for the Second Circuit
- Full case name: Doe v. Mukasey (formerly Doe v. Ashcroft, Doe v. Gonzalez)
- Decided: December 15, 2008
- Citation: 549 F.3d 861 (2d Cir. 2008)

Case history
- Prior action: District Court struck down National Security Letter (NSL) provisions (2004)
- Appealed from: United States District Court for the Southern District of New York
- Appealed to: United States Court of Appeals for the Second Circuit
- Subsequent actions: Affirmed in part, remanded, later dismissed as moot
- Related actions: Doe v. Gonzalez, Doe v. Ashcroft

Court membership
- Judges sitting: Victor Marrero (District Court), Second Circuit Court of Appeals panel

Case opinions
- Second Circuit upheld nondisclosure rules but imposed judicial review requirement
- Decision by: Second Circuit Court of Appeals

John Doe v. Alberto R. Gonzales (originally filed as Doe v. Ashcroft, renamed Doe v. Gonzalez, and finally issued as Doe v. Mukasey) was a case in which the American Civil Liberties Union (ACLU), Library Connection, and several then-pseudonymous librarians, challenged Section 2709 of the Patriot Act; it was consolidated on appeal with a separate case, Doe v. Ashcroft.

== Facts ==
John Doe was the recipient of a National Security Letter (NSL) that requested all information associated with one of his Connecticut library's computers. § 2709 imposed a gag order on the recipients so they could neither inform anyone of receiving the letter, nor act as witnesses.

== Rulings ==
In September 2004, Judge Victor Marrero of the United States District Court for the Southern District of New York struck down the NSL provisions of the USA PATRIOT Act. The government appealed the case to the United States Court of Appeals for the Second Circuit.

Justice Ruth Bader Ginsburg, a Justice of the Supreme Court of the United States, acted as a single Circuit Justice for this case. She ruled against vacating the stay imposed by the Court of Appeals of the Second Circuit upon the Federal District Court's preliminary injunction. Ginsburg said that the Court should hesitate to interfere with an appeals court that was proceeding on an expedited schedule to review a ruling against a federal law, and that, in any event, the Court should be cautious when such a law had been nullified in a lower court. Nearly a year later, the government dropped its demands and allowed the release of the NSL. The ACLU and Library Connection hailed the government's withdrawal as a victory for all library users who valued their privacy. The case was dismissed as moot.

The New York Civil Liberties Union (NYCLU) and ACLU returned to court in the Southern District of New York on Aug. 15, 2007, arguing that the amended law was unconstitutional because it impermissibly narrowed judicial authority in violation of the separation-of-powers principle and the First Amendment. Judge Marrero agreed and struck down the NSL provision of the amended law. The government appealed the decision in the Second Circuit. On March 19, 2008, the ACLU and the Electronic Frontier Foundation (EFF) filed Amicus briefs at the Second Circuit Court of Appeals arguing that the modifications made in the 2007 USA PATRIOT act are unconstitutional and should be struck down. Oral argument was heard on August 27, 2008, and on December 15, 2008, the Second Circuit issued its opinion affirming that the nondisclosure rules (the "gag order") were constitutional.

== Effects ==
The librarians were awarded the 2005 Robert B. Downs Intellectual Freedom Award, by the American Library Association.

== Related cases ==
- Doe v. Gonzalez, 386 F. Supp. 2d 66 (D.Conn. 2005)
- Doe v. Ashcroft, 1:04-cv-02614 (SDNY) - ACLU filed suit in April 2004 in support of a John Doe ISP
  - Doe v. Ashcroft, 317 F. Supp. 2d 488 (S.D.N.Y. May 2004) - Order redacting many documents.
  - Doe v. Ashcroft, 334 F. Supp. 2d. 471 (S.D.N.Y. Sept. 2004)
- "USA PATRIOT Improvement and Reauthorization Act of 2005", PL No. 109-177, 120 Stat. 192 (March 9, 2006)
- Doe v. Gonzalez, 449 F.3d 415 (2d Cir. May 23, 2006) - Consolidated appeal of Doe v. Ashcroft and Doe v. Gonzalez. 2d Circuit vacated and remanded in light of Congressional amendments USA Patriot Improvement & Reauthorization Act.
- Doe v. Gonzalez, 500 F.Supp.2d 386 (SDNY Sept. 2007). District Court invalidated entirety of 2709(c) and 3511(b)
- Doe v. Mukasey, 549 F.3d 861 (2d Cir. Dec. 15, 2008). 2d Circuit affirmed unconstitutionality of statutes "to the extent that they impose a nondisclosure requirement on NSL recipients without placing on the Government the burden of initiating judicial review of such a requirement"
- Remanded to District Court in October 2009.
- Amended order, March 2010.
- Appealed to the 2d Circuit, May 2010; appeal subsequently withdrawn.
- Stipulation and case dismissed, July 30, 2010.
