= Criticisms of Baidu =

Chinese online retailer's controversies

Criticisms of Baidu and related controversies refer to the critical assessment of incidents involving Baidu (a large Chinese web services company) and its products by its customers (primarily in mainland China).

== Domain name hijacking ==
In September 2002, Baidu experienced a service outage. Baidu then urgently addressed "harmful" information (i.e., "sensitive" information), and its services returned to normal. Subsequently, mainland Chinese citizens who used the World Wide Web discovered that they were suddenly unable to access the Google website. This situation lasted nearly two weeks, forcing many users to abandon Google and switch to Baidu. During this time, the Google.com domain name was redirected to several search sites, including Baidu. Although access to Google was eventually restored, its services have remained highly unstable in mainland China ever since (and are now entirely inaccessible there). Additionally, the web cache feature was unavailable for an extended period.

Baidu President Robin Li denied that Baidu had engaged in such actions when questioned by students during a speech at Peking University.

On October 18, 2007, Google, Windows Live Search, and Yahoo! Kimo Search were once again hijacked and redirected to Baidu's domain, drawing widespread media attention both domestically and internationally.

On November 7, 2008, Shanghai Vixi, the parent company of VeryCD.com, a P2P resource-sharing website in mainland China, announced that some Beijing Netcom (now part of China Unicom) users experienced redirects to Baidu when attempting to access VeryCD.com, Emule.org.cn, Shooter.cn, BtChina, as well as international websites such as IsoHunt.com and Mininova.org. Subsequently, Netcom customer service staff stated that they were not involved in this matter.

== Malware ==
=== Forced installation of related Baidu software ===
See also: Baidu Family Bucket

The browser toolbar software developed by Baidu, originally called Baidu Super Soba, forced users to install it and could not be completely uninstalled. On July 11, 2005, it was named by the China Network Industry Association as one of the 10 pieces of malware and was ordered to undergo rectification. Baidu later responded that the renamed Baidu Super Soba, now called Baidu Toolbar, could be completely uninstalled. Additionally, some of Baidu's products were bundled with other software, causing a series of Baidu applications to be installed on users' computers or smart devices without their knowledge. This practice has led some users to refer to it as the 'Baidu Family Bucket.'

=== Malicious code ===
Main article: Baidu's website hidden malicious code incident

On February 28, 2017, Huorong Security Laboratory intercepted, analyzed, tracked, and verified that malicious code was implanted when users downloaded software from two of Baidu's software download sites. Once the malicious code enters a computer, it employs various methods, such as loading drivers, to prevent removal, allowing it to remain hidden for extended periods. It can then be remotely controlled via the cloud to hijack various types of traffic, including navigation portals, e-commerce sites, and advertising networks.

=== Privacy infringement ===
On January 5, 2018, the Jiangsu Provincial Consumer Protection Commission determined that two of Baidu's mobile apps were suspected of infringing on consumers' personal rights and interests. After two unsuccessful negotiations, the commission filed a civil public interest lawsuit against Baidu. On January 11, the Information and Communication Administration of the Ministry of Industry and Information Technology held a meeting with Baidu's corporate representatives, requiring the company to strictly comply with relevant laws and regulations and adhere to the principles of legality, legitimacy, and necessity when collecting and using personal information. Meanwhile, Today's Headlines (Toutiao), which had a dispute with Baidu, reported that when searching for "Jiangsu Provincial Consumer Association" on Baidu, the official website's search result was marked in red with a warning: "Reminder: This page may not be accessible normally due to unstable service." At the same time, results from other search engines showed no such warning, and users were able to access the official website of the Jiangsu Provincial Consumer Protection Association without any issues.

== Trademark infringement litigation ==
On April 23, 2020, the Changsha Intellectual Property Court held a public trial in which Baidu sued Changsha Baidu Car Rental for trademark infringement and unfair competition.

== Controversies related to search results ==
Main article: Baidu promotion and Baidu bidding ranking events

=== Death of Wei Zexi ===
In 2014, Wei Zexi, a sophomore in the Computer Science Department of Xidian University, was diagnosed with advanced synovial sarcoma. After undergoing various chemotherapy and radiotherapy treatments, Wei Zexi's family sought the so-called "tumor biological immunotherapy" (DC-CIK therapy) at the Tumor Biology Center of the Second Hospital of the Beijing Municipal Armed Police Corps, which had been recommended by Baidu. However, despite spending significant amounts of money (over 200,000 yuan) and time, the treatment proved ineffective. Wei Zexi died on April 12, 2016. The incident gained widespread attention during the May Day holiday, leading to a sharp drop in Baidu's stock price. Chinese public opinion, including state media, heavily criticized Baidu. In addition to Baidu being implicated as a major suspect and undergoing regulatory scrutiny, it was revealed that the hospital had outsourced its oncology department to the controversial Putian network of private hospitals. As a result, the Second Hospital of the Beijing Armed Police Corps was delisted, and related individuals were prosecuted. Shortly after the incident, a former Baidu employee alleged that Baidu used free WiFi devices, installed in collaboration with certain hospitals, to collect data from devices connected to these WiFi networks. However, this claim has not been verified.

=== Promotion of gambling sites ===
On July 17, 2016, a reporter from The Beijing News discovered that Baidu began promoting illegal content, such as gambling, at around 10 p.m. and quietly removed it by 9 a.m. the following day. On July 18, Sina News reported on the issue, highlighting Baidu's severe management negligence and incompetence at the administrative level. The report stated that "most of Baidu's non-enterprise channel user authentication information is misappropriated, and the companies whose information is stolen are completely unaware. Even if they file complaints, agents or non-enterprise channel sales representatives will immediately deactivate the 'reported accounts' and register new accounts under another company the next day to continue the promotions."

On the afternoon of July 18, 2016, Baidu responded that the gambling information on the implicated websites had been privately and illegally modified late at night by enterprises in violation of regulations. Baidu also reported the matter to public security authorities.

On July 20, 2016, Baidu shut down all commercial promotion pages. By the end of July 2016, Baidu resumed its commercial promotion pages.

=== Fraud while searching for foreign wine recycling on Baidu. ===
In December 2016, a Shenzhen resident, Ms. Yi, reported to the CCTV news hotline that she owned a bottle of Louis XIII cognac, valued at over 20,000 yuan. As she was preparing to move, Ms. Yi decided to sell the bottle. Using her mobile phone, she searched on Baidu with the keyword "foreign wine recycling Shenzhen" and found a promotional advertisement for a company called "Shenzhen Ruya Gift Recycling Company." She chose this company to collect the wine at her home. When representatives from the gift recycling company arrived, Ms. Yi refused to proceed with the transaction as their offer was lower than her expected price. However, while Ms. Yi was unprepared, the company's representatives swapped her genuine cognac for a fake bottle. The following day, after discovering the swap, Ms. Yi immediately called the police and contacted Baidu's customer service to request compensation and to have the company's advertisement removed from Baidu. Customer service responded that Baidu has a protection plan, but since Ms. Yi had not logged into her Baidu account when conducting the search, she was not eligible for compensation. Regarding the fraudulent company's advertisement on Baidu, customer service stated that the issue would be followed up, but local law enforcement would need to provide the necessary documentation.

=== Fake NARS Chinese official website incident ===
In July 2017, some netizens reported to Beijing Youth Daily that they encountered a fake Chinese official website when searching for NARS brand cosmetics on Baidu. After logging into the counterfeit website and purchasing products through Alipay, the money was transferred to a personal account. A reporter from Beijing Youth Daily searched Baidu using the keyword "NARS China official website" and found that the top search result was titled "NARS Brand Chinese Website." The reporter contacted the Shiseido Group, which owns the NARS brand, to verify the authenticity of the website. Customer service confirmed that the website was counterfeit, as NARS products had not yet entered the Chinese market. Additionally, the quality of the products sold on the website could not be guaranteed. Regarding the legal issues involved with the counterfeit website, a reporter consulted Han Xiao, a lawyer from Beijing Kangda Law Firm. Han Xiao explained that, according to Article 44 of the Law on the Protection of the Rights and Interests of Consumers of the People's Republic of China: "If the provider of an online trading platform knows or should know that the seller or service provider uses its platform to infringe on the legitimate rights and interests of consumers and fails to take necessary measures, it shall be jointly and severally liable with the seller or service provider by law." Therefore, consumers have the right to demand joint and several liability from both the online platform and the seller.

=== Fake Apple official after-sales repair shop incident ===
On January 21, 2018, a Sina Weibo user named "Yan Gongzi of Yijin Night Walking" posted on Weibo that when searching for "Apple mobile phone repair" on Baidu, the top result displayed the phone number "4006368800." However, after calling the number, the user found it suspicious and decided to check the official Apple website. There, they discovered that the official customer service number was "4006668800," differing by just one digit. Apple's official customer service also confirmed that "4006368800" was not associated with them in any way. Other netizens reported having been scammed by this fake Apple phone repair shop.

=== "Fuda Hospital" advertising event ===
In September 2018, according to media reports, a woman surnamed Zhou from Ningbo, Zhejiang Province, wanted to go to the Eye and ENT Hospital of Fudan University in Shanghai for rhinitis treatment. In the end, Miss Zhou chose "Fuda Hospital" for medical treatment and paid nearly 10,000 yuan for turbinate removal surgery under the doctor's advice, but her condition did not improve. After that, Ms. Zhou was transferred to the hospital for treatment and found that her condition could be treated only with medication. Another woman from Anhui Province surnamed Chen, had a small bulging bag in the back of her head, so the local hospital recommended that she go to the Fudan University Hospital in Shanghai for medical treatment. After Ms. Chen searched through Baidu, the first result was "Fuda Hospital," she took her child to "Fuda Hospital" for treatment. The doctor diagnosed it as "right posterior occipital cavernous hemangioma." The next day, Ms. Chen took her child to the Children's Hospital of Fudan University for an examination, and the results showed that lymph nodes had grown and would disappear naturally when they grew up. In this regard, Baidu said it has taken down all the promotional content about Shanghai's "Fuda Hospital" and conducted a comprehensive investigation of its misleading information. In addition, the Ministry of Industry and Commerce and the Ministry of Health Supervision also launched an investigation. They demanded that the hospital immediately stop the illegal acts, and the hospital was also punished with eight demerit points for deficient practices in medical institutions. On September 9, Baidu's official Weibo stated that it decided to continue to promote the brand protection project of public hospitals and, at the same time, protect the search results of relevant affiliated hospitals of Fudan University. Commercial advertisements will not appear when searching for related keywords.

=== Misleading ads for the U.S. Consulate General in Shanghai ===
On September 6, 2018, writer Liuliu posted on Weibo that when she searched for the official website of the Consulate General of the United States in Shanghai on Baidu, the results were flooded with advertisements, while the official website ranked far behind. In response, Baidu issued a statement apologizing sincerely to Liuliu and its users, removed advertisements related to visa agencies using "Consulate General of the United States in Shanghai," and implemented brand protection measures for the consulate's official website and related brand keywords.

=== Counterfeit Visa website incident ===
On November 29, 2018, Yan Feng, a professor in the Department of Chinese at Fudan University, posted on Weibo that while applying for an electronic visa for Turkey, he used Baidu to search for a website called "Turkey Visa Application Center" and ended up spending $129 through this institution. Yan Feng later discovered that the top two "Turkey Visa Application Center" results on Baidu were third-party agencies, causing him to pay nearly double the usual cost for the visa application.

=== Searching "QQ mailbox" shows phishing sites for account theft ===
On November 29, 2018, some netizens reported that a phishing website appeared when searching for "QQ mailbox" on Baidu. A screenshot shared by a netizen showed that after entering "QQ mailbox" into Baidu's search bar, the top search result, marked as an advertisement, was titled "Log in to QQ mailbox," with the website address listed as qq.qcxhc.top. According to Baidu's certification information, the website belonged to Suqian Dongtong E-commerce Co., Ltd.

Later that afternoon, Baidu issued an official response stating that it had banned the website in question and reported the matter to the public security authorities. When a reporter from The Beijing News contacted the company associated with the website, a representative claimed that the company had been sold in 2017 and denied placing phishing advertisements on Baidu.

=== Fake travel agency for Hong Kong and Macau tours ===
Chinese New Year Festival from February 4 to 10, 2019, the Shenzhen Municipal Consumer Council received a total of 26 complaints about "Hong Kong and Macao tours," half of which were through Baidu search and chose to claim to be Shenzhen International Travel Service for Hong Kong and Macao tours on the Baidu Plus V certified website, during which tourists were forced to buy jewelry, gold, chocolates, watches and other items. In addition to compulsory shopping, hotels and meals are not in line with the advertisement. The website that claims to be Shenzhen International Travel Service has nothing to do with the official International Travel Service (Shenzhen) International Travel Service Co., Ltd.

The Shenzhen Municipal Consumer Council simulated consumer usage scenarios for CCTV-2 reporters and conducted a test survey in Baidu search. After the staff entered keywords such as "Hong Kong and Macao International Travel Service" to search, the first information on the Home was advertising information named "Shenzhen International Travel Service" and claimed to be "the designated outbound travel agency of the State Tourism Administration." Still, after verification by the Shenzhen Municipal Consumer Council staff, the commercial entity registration information did not include this enterprise.

After completing the special test investigation, the Shenzhen Municipal Consumer Commission sent a supervision letter to Baidu per the Law on the Protection of Consumer Rights and Interests. After the Shenzhen Municipal Consumer Commission sent a supervision letter, Baidu officials responded and decided to suspend the release of Baidu Credit V-certified advertisements by travel agencies in Guangdong, Clean up Baidu organic search results, Promise to launch Baidu's netizen rights protection plan and pay compensation to the victimized consumers in advance.

Yu Xifeng, deputy secretary-general of the Shenzhen Municipal Consumer Protection Commission, believes that much of the promotional information released by Baidu V certification is suspected of being false and has violated the Advertising Law. Article 56 of the Advertising Law also stipulates that if the advertisement publisher knows or should know that the published content is false, it shall bear joint and several liability with the advertiser.

=== Off-market financing-related advertisements ===
On April 24, 2019, the 21st Century Business Herald reporter searched for "over-the-counter allocation" through Baidu, and 5 of the ten results on the first screen were advertisements for the distribution platform. Even 3 of the first 5 were advertisements on the distribution website. However, according to the regulations of the China Securities Regulatory Commission, none of the over-the-counter capital allocation platforms are qualified to operate securities business, and some are suspected of engaging in illegal securities business activities, and some are even suspected of engaging in unlawful and criminal activities such as fraud using "virtual disks." The CSRC also reminded investors to stay away from over-the-counter capital allocation to avoid losses.

=== Fill in volunteer events on search engines ===
On June 25, 2019, the Shanxi Provincial Enrollment and Examination Management Center issued a reminder that candidates should not use search engines to access the webpage of the online volunteer system when filling out their volunteer forms. Otherwise, they might mistakenly enter other websites, rendering the information they submit invalid and causing adverse consequences, such as the leakage of personal information, including their passwords. Some netizens shared screenshots showing that searching for terms like "college entrance examination volunteers" through Baidu, 360, and other search engines often returns top results that are advertisements for apps, websites, or consulting agencies charging high service fees. It is difficult to find the official portal for filling out volunteer applications, and there are issues like a lack of standardization and security risks. Baidu responded by stating that since 2013, it has protected the official websites of examination admission institutes, displayed these official websites prominently in search results, and provided free "official website" logo certification for such sites.

=== Fake funeral home events appear in search results ===
In July 2019, when an elderly man from a family surnamed Zhou died in Shanghai, Mr. Zhou made a call to the number displayed first on Baidu's search results for "Shanghai Longhua Funeral Home." Staff members visited Mr. Zhou's home and signed a contract with him. According to this contract, renting a small hall cost 8,500 yuan, and additional cremation and other fees totaled over 10,000 yuan, nearly reaching 20,000 yuan. The staff insisted that the charges were in accordance with state regulations. The next day, Mr. Zhou went to the actual Longhua Funeral Home to inquire, only to discover the issue: the phone number found online did not belong to the official "Shanghai Longhua Funeral Home." The fees charged were more than double those of a legitimate funeral home. Mr. Zhou realized he had encountered a fraudulent "ghost" website.

=== The fraud gang spent 6 million yuan on Baidu promotions to sell fake drugs. ===
In December 2019, police in Shuyang County, Suqian City, cracked an online fraud case. Since May 2018, several suspects had repackaged tea drinks worth only a few yuan into an "ancestral miracle medicine" that supposedly "cures all diseases." They primarily used Baidu's advertising promotion feature to perpetrate the fraud, accumulating sales exceeding one thousand yuan. When victims searched for keywords related to certain diseases, such as thyroid issues or breast nodules, they were directed to links promoted by the suspects, falling into the scammers' trap.

According to the suspects, they had invested over 6 million yuan in purchasing Baidu promotional keywords. They falsely claimed that health drinks costing just 10 to a few dozen yuan could treat conditions like thyroid diseases, breast nodules, and diabetes, marketing them as "special drugs" at high prices ranging from 1,280 to 1,680 yuan. One suspect, Ma, confessed: "Each of the nine of us made profits of hundreds of thousands of yuan, but most of the money was used for promotion." The suspects only required the tea drinks to have no side effects when dealing with manufacturers.

Ma also revealed that, through an acquaintance, he met a salesperson claiming to represent Baidu. The salesperson promised to promote their product for a fee, stating: "For twenty or thirty thousand yuan a day, I guarantee that the first link people find on the internet will be yours."

It was reported that over 5,000 people across the country had been deceived by the scam.

=== Baidu Search Recommends Fake Customer Service Numbers: Just Pay to Appear. ===
In October 2021, Mr. Xue, who lives in Jiangning, Nanjing, suddenly broke down due to a washing machine, and his first thought was to go to Baidu to search and solve the problem. Later, it was revealed that it was fake after-sales personnel, and then the reporter learned through investigation that they only needed to pay a service fee, and the click fee could be on Baidu's search headlines.

=== The controversy over whether Baidu promotion is an advertisement ===
Main article: Baidu Promotion § Controversy over whether Baidu Promotion is an advertisement

=== The issue of "dual standards" in mobile and web promotion ===
When netizens searched for "Debang Logistics" on Baidu on their mobile phones, the first result was the so-called "Debang Logistics Official Website." A customer dialed the phone number on the website and placed an order, only to find when he received the logistics that the shipment was not from Deppon Logistics but a copycat logistics company opened in the name of Debang. On the webpage of the promotion advertisement, the name, logo, hotline, and even the website's domain name were extremely similar to the regular Deppon Logistics. According to an investigation by a the Voice of China reporter, the standard of receiving and sending for Shanzhai Debang is also very different from the genuine brand; Shanzhai Debang only accepts large items of more than 30 kilograms, and the minimum shipping fee is more than 500 yuan, while the minimum shipping fee for genuine Debang is 60 yuan. When two staff members came to pick up the parcel, the courier slip they showed differed slightly from the courier bill of genuine Debang. In the upper left corner, next to the LOGO of "Debang," there was also a tiny word, "pay," so "Fu Debang" was the name of the copycat Debang company. The courier who took the order was not assigned from the nearest Xicheng Beijing of Beijing but came from Tongzhou District, more than 30 kilometres away. Other than that, none of the two staff members who came to pick up the parcel wore "Debang" courier overalls. The reporter then searched for "daily logistics" on the mobile terminal, showing that the first place was "rookie wrapping" and the second was "Aneng logistics." Later, when the reporter tried to search for some popular terms on Baidu, including hospitals and hotel accommodations, there were often "interference ads" at the top of the search list, and the search display was often different. Due to screen size limitations on mobile phones, it is easy for ads at the top of the PPC to squeeze into space, and it may be difficult for users to find what they are searching for without scrolling down. After the incident, Baidu stated on Baidu's official Weibo that Baidu's misjudgment in the qualification review and authorization relationship led to the illegal promotion, and it apologized to the relevant parties. All the merchants not promoted by Debang Logistics using the keyword "Debang Logistics" were taken offline, and Baidu compensated and protected users who suffered losses in this incident and expressed gratitude to the media for their supervision and reporting. The statement said that before the incident, when the Baidu mobile platform searched for "Debang Logistics," two promotion merchants appeared. The "Fu Debang" brand mentioned in the report is a company called "Debang Logistics Services (Shenzhen) Co., Ltd." Another promoter, named Shenzhen Kahang Debang Logistics Co., Ltd., also had the official trademark authorization letter of Debang Logistics Co., Ltd., which Debang Logistics Co., Ltd., later verified. Debang Logistics has no relationship with the above two companies, nor has it made any authorization to Shenzhen Kahang Debang Logistics Co., Ltd., and the authorization letter submitted to Baidu for review was forged.

In addition, the reporter of "Southern Metropolis Daily" also investigated this phenomenon. According to reports, the reporter searched on Baidu's web page with "Shenkui", "gastritis," "Bariatrics," and "muscle atrophy" as keywords and found that on the first page of the search results, there was no advertising content, only some web information and comprehensive knowledge. Users are presented with additional search results on mobile, and the top rankings are ads.

=== An issue has arisen with advertisements for 'Buying a new strain ===
When the new coronavirus variant Omicron was found in South Africa, users used Baidu to search for a new strain in South Africa. A Taobao matching ad automatically appeared: "Buy the almighty Taobao on the new strain found in South Africa! Enjoy a surprise price for quality." Baidu should directly package and sell popular keywords to advertisers for matching, and Taobao and Baidu have yet to review these keywords.

== Baidu Tieba related controversy ==
=== 2009 pornography controversy ===
On January 5, 2009, Baidu's Baidu Tieba and Baidu Space were exposed by the China Illegal and Adverse Information Reporting Center in the first batch of websites to reveal the vulgar style of the Internet in the country and ranked second, only after Google. On January 8, Baidu was classified as a "website with ineffective cleanup and rectification work" in the "Notice on the First Batch of Exposed Websites in the National Special Action to Rectify Internet Vulgarity."

The content of the exposure is:

There are a large number of vulgar pictures in the "Baidu Tieba" and "Baidu Space" of "Baidu.com," and there is obscene and pornographic content in some sections. There are a large number of links to pornographic websites in the "Web Search" results of Baidu Search. After receiving the notification from the reporting center, the website did not take adequate measures.

The report on the remediation situation is as follows:

"Baidu.com" has cleaned up "Baidu Tieba," "Baidu Space," and "Web Search," but it is apparent that some of the content may be considered vulgar.

=== In 2009, the college Baidu Tieba Ban Incident ===
2009 marked the 20th anniversary of the 1989 Tiananmen Square protests and massacre. To suppress speech, Baidu Tieba implemented a ban on Chinese college and university Tieba starting on May 23. Users could only browse posts but were unable to post or reply. When users attempted to reply, a message would appear stating, "Sorry, this Tieba is currently read-only and posting is not allowed."

In December 2011, the ban on Baidu Tieba in some colleges and universities was lifted. In February 2012, Baidu suddenly announced that it would merge the banned college Baidu Tieba with its university's alternative Baidu Tieba, and prominent Baidu Tieba moderators were required to apply for real-name registration.

Since January 2013, the vast majority of colleges and universities have begun lifting the ban on Baidu Tieba one after another and recruiting Tieba moderators. The ban on Baidu Tieba at some universities has also been gradually lifted, and the Tieba moderator system was reformulated. However, on March 1, 2016, Baidu officials removed the entire moderator team of the Tsinghua University Baidu Tieba, which triggered a wave of Tieba disruptions.

=== In 2012, Baidu employees accepted bribes to delete posts for a fee. ===
According to media reports, Baidu employee Xu, who was responsible for handling complaints and reviewing moderators in Baidu Tieba, conspired with his former colleague Lu. Lu was in charge of contacting external parties, while Xu exploited his authority to delete posts, appoint, or dismiss moderators in Baidu Tieba to profit from the scheme. After collaborating to delete hundreds of posts, Xu received more than 80,000 yuan in kickbacks from Lu. In July 2012, Baidu reported the case to the authorities, leading to the arrest of Xu and Lu.

=== It was condemned and exposed during the Clean Net 2014 campaign. ===
Main article:Anti-pornography and anti-· net 2014 special operation

On June 5, 2014, Baidu Tieba was investigated by the relevant departments of the State Administration of Press, Publication, Radio, Film and Television because the website and 52 websites such as NetEase Blog, Tudou.com, and Daoke Baba were suspected of publishing and disseminating "Grimm's Fairy Tales" series, "Dark Fairy Tales" series, "Evil Fairy Tales" series and other illegal online publications involving gangsters, violence, obscenity and pornography. The State Administration of Radio, Film, and Television claimed that once it was verified, it would impose penalties by the law and investigate its civil and criminal liability. After the incident, Baidu announced the launch of a "special campaign to combat sensitive and false information," set up a particular column to publicize the total number of deleted information and banned accounts, and also asked netizens to cooperate in reporting and deleting posts containing "sensitive and false information."

=== In 2014, Baidu Guardian bundled the installation of rogue software ===
In 2014, Zhou Hongyi, the author of 360 Antivirus and chairman of Qihoo, pointed out in his Sina Weibo post that Baidu Guardian maliciously bundled rogue software and exploited the vulnerability of Internet Explorer browser to install the software on computers without the user's knowledge and authorization. Zhou Hongyi called Baidu a "hundred poison company" and "a hooligan" on Weibo. Baidu was dissatisfied with the title of "100 poisons" and sued 360 in court, demanding an apology and compensation of 5 million yuan.

=== The problem of piracy of original literature on the Internet ===
According to a report by Southern Metropolis Daily on April 25, 2016, Baidu Tieba used piracy to provide netizens with many infringing original online literary works. In this regard, online literary writers have reported and defended their rights in various ways. On May 23, 2016, Baidu Tieba launched a crackdown on piracy, including the majority of novel Tieba such as "Ghost Blows Out the Light" and "Daomu Biji" being banned, and users will be prompted to "According to relevant laws, regulations, and policies, this bar is temporarily closed" when entering the stickers mentioned above. Later, Baidu Tieba said that this move was to increase the protection of genuine copyrights and safeguard the rights and interests of the original creators.

=== The "Sell the Baidu Tieba" Incident ===
"Sell It" refers to the practice where Baidu removes the moderator of a Baidu Tieba (despite the original moderator having no violations) and transfers the position to another user who has paid a certain amount of money to Baidu. The new moderators are often organizations such as education and training institutions, medical institutions, or gaming companies. This process is also known as the "airborne moderator" practice.

=== The 2015 Incident of Moderator Replacement in the "Fleet Collection" Forum ===
On January 14, 2015, three original moderators of the "Fleet Collection" Baidu Tieba were removed by the Baidu Tieba management team without prior warning, citing reasons such as "receiving user reports" and "not actively cooperating with official activities." The moderator team was also disbanded. Subsequently, from the evening of the 14th to the 15th, several new moderators were "parachuted" into the Tieba, including "athlon18," a former moderator from the "Fleet Collection National Server" Tieba (on January 15, "athlon18" was removed from their moderator position in the National Server Tieba).

Rumors spread within the Tieba that individuals associated with the "Fleet Collection" private server had forcibly taken control of the Tieba and that the moderators' accounts had been hacked (a claim unilaterally confirmed by Baidu). It was alleged that Baidu received 700,000 RMB from private server operators to remove the original moderators, replace them with private server promoters, and pin private server promotional content to the top of the forum.

The incident triggered strong dissatisfaction among Tieba users and other enthusiasts. The "Fleet Collection" Tieba was flooded with disruptive posts, including doujinshi-related content, and its private server websites were heavily targeted by DDoS attacks. Many high-quality posts were deleted, leading to a significant loss of users and members, and the forum became paralyzed for a time. Temporary protection measures were implemented, restricting posting to the moderation team, though these restrictions were later lifted.

On January 15 and afterward, the new moderators "athlon18," "Axiulin," and Baidu officials denied the rumors, banned private server discussions in their posts, and provided explanations, calling for calm. On January 27, Baidu removed two new moderators it deemed to have taken office improperly but retained the moderator privileges of "athlon18," a former moderator from the National Server Tieba. At 11:00 AM on February 6, Baidu revoked the moderator privileges of "athlon18" and other team members and approved the moderator application of "Nanfengzhishou."

Due to the public outrage caused by the rumors, some moderators of other Tiebas live-streamed or pinned posts about "selling moderator positions" as a form of protest and satire. For a time, "700,000" became a buzzword across major ACG (Anime, Comic, and Game) websites.

=== 2015 Minecraft Baidu Tieba Airborne Main Event ===
On September 21, 2015, some netizens broke the news that the Minecraft bar was sold by Baidu to a mobile game called "Our World" for 9.3 million, and the bar's owner was also replaced with "Our World GM." At the same time, the pinned post of the Minecraft bar was replaced with the "first test of the sandbox online mobile game "Our World" on Android" issued by "Our World GM," as well as three posts containing download links to the game "Our World," and the original pinned post was canceled. The above behaviors are said to have been published by Baidu and the new bar owner with their permission.

Minecraft Bar Owners recalled that on August 25, 2015, a game company asked them to help promote Minecraft Online. However, for various reasons, the Minecraft bars refused their request.

Some netizens tried the game and found that the content (including painting style, gameplay, etc.) is the same as Minecraft; the only difference is that all the materials in "Our World" need to be recharged to buy. This caused protests from Minecraft players and bar buddies. Some bar friends began to explode on the "Our World Mobile Game Bar" and Minecraft Bar, and then it was suspected that Baidu officials and new bar owners carried out special treatment of the post bar, such as the post was deleted and the account that posted was banned for a day.

On the morning of September 22, the former Minecraft Bar announced that it had regained control of the Tieba and declared a state of emergency for the entire bar. The bar has contacted the relevant departments through channels, and the infringing content will make the "Our World" mobile game pay a price. Currently, the post has been deleted.

=== The 2016 hemophilia Baidu Tieba incident ===
On January 7, 2016, netizens began to disclose that Baidu sold hemophilia bars and other disease stickers; the process of the incident with the ship's mother bar and Minecraft bar was condemned by many netizens for the life of Grass Kan. On January 13, Baidu Tieba announced that all disease bars would stop commercial cooperation and would only be open to authoritative public welfare organizations, among which the owner of the hemophilia bar has been changed to "Beijing Hemophilia Home." Soon after, Baidu's "Fangcheng Bar" and "Zhengzhou Bar" were also involved in the sale of bars, of which the price of "Zhengzhou Bar" for one year of management was 2 million yuan.

On January 16, 2016, China's National Health and Family Planning Commission held a regular press conference to learn about the incident from Baidu. On the same day, the Cyberspace Administration of China interviewed the main person in charge of Baidu in response to the prominent problems raised by the incident. The person in charge of Baidu said he would seriously reflect on the company's management failures, explain "hemophilia" to netizens, and rectify comprehensively. On February 20, Baidu announced the results of the incident: Wang Zhan, vice president of Baidu, director of CBG and general manager of Tieba Division, and Zhang Yaqin, president of Baidu and head of EBG and extensive market system, were publicly notified and punished.

On May 1, 2016, China Business Taoluo published a report stating that the Putian department was the largest financier of Baidu's purchase of disease types. Mainstream news media such as Sina and Sohu have special reports regarding this incident.

=== Subject-specific forums were sold ===
In August 2015, the High School Math Forum was sold to Jinghua Education, and a new forum owner with the Baidu ID "High School Math Forum Owner" was parachuted in. During this period, Jinghua Education agreed to retain the autonomy of the forum members, that is, to maintain some of the original forum owners. However, the original forum owners were removed not long after, and the High School Math Forum was utterly sold. However, for some reason, Jinghua Education no longer served as the forum owner, and the High School Math Forum was removed. Between January 13 and 22, 2016, Jinghua Online broke its promise again and published 58 advertising theme posts. This move triggered another wave of forum explosions. The parachuted forum owners at this time were "High School Math Leader" and "High School Math Expert." This incident also caused the forum members to register some similar IDs with sarcastic meanings, such as "High School Super Science Expert," "High School Philosophy Expert," "High School Folk Science Expert," "High School Math Expert," etc. After experiencing the forum explosion storm, Jinghua Online left the forum. The subsequent takeover of Simple Learning Network has yet to take many publicity activities.

On April 26, 2016, the moderator of the Chemistry Forum and the High School Chemistry Forum, “Rreflect_F,” posted a message on the Chemistry Forum, announcing that all the forum staff of the High School Chemistry Forum had been removed. The next day, all the forum staff of the Crystal Chemistry Forum (archived version of this page, stored in the Internet Archive) had also been removed.

=== University-related forums were sold ===
In 2019, some British colleges were sold to "Yixiang Haoju" and parachuted as forum moderators. During this period, Yixiang Haoju posted advertisements in the forum, created groups under the name of current students to deceive new students into joining, and deceived many new students into renting apartments with extremely poor conditions at prices much higher than the market price on the grounds that "dormitories cannot be applied for", while in fact, the colleges were guaranteeing dormitory places for new students.

=== Overwatch forum banned ===
On April 29, 2017, Baidu cleared all the content of the Overwatch forum without giving any reason and banned the creation of this forum. Baidu's official response was that there was a lot of illegal information in the forum. However, most forum users pointed out that a small forum owner deleted Baidu's promotional posts many times, which led to the closure. The forum has now resumed regular operation.

=== The Quit Gambling Bar was blocked ===
Main article: Quit gambling

After the Xinhua News Agency published a report titled "Quitting Gambling or Inducing Gambling? — An Investigation into Gambling Addicts Gathering Online in Borrowing Names", which exposed negative information such as running away and being a "big brother," Baidu Tieba suspended the "Quit Gambling Bar" service, which had more than 14 million followers.

== Baidu Netdisk-related controversy ==
=== User privacy issues ===
On July 18, 2017, a we-media user reported that files publicly shared through Baidu Netdisk could be viewed and downloaded by anyone. These files were also searchable on some third-party Netdisk search websites, including personal photos, address books, and other personal information shared by Netdisk users, posing a certain risk of user privacy leakage.

On August 18, 2022, a netizen claimed that he had applied for a job as a manual reviewer for Baidu Netdisk and showed that he could review photos uploaded by users, which attracted attention. That evening, Baidu Netdisk officially responded that the manual review of photos was a rumor.

=== Clean Network Action ===
Main article: Anti-pornography and illegal publications, clean internet in 2014

Because Baidu Netdisk's file-sharing function is convenient, many users use it to spread content that is restricted on websites in the People's Republic of China, such as pornographic content.[1] As a result, Baidu Netdisk was once interviewed by relevant departments in mainland China. Since 2014, Baidu Netdisk has responded to the "Clean Internet" campaign sponsored by the National Office of the People's Republic of China to Combat Pornography and Illegal Publications almost yearly. It self-censors files uploaded by users and deletes certain content restricted to mainland China.

Baidu Netdisk will continue to intensify its efforts to clean up pornographic, obscene, violent, and terrorist information and files involving infringement uploaded, stored, and shared by users. It will take comprehensive cleaning and permanent ban measures for related negative information and accounts that violate regulations.

During the 2014 anti-pornography and anti-illegal publications campaign, many users found that some of the videos on their online disks had been replaced with "8-second Baidu Cloud Net Cleaning Action Announcement" (commonly known as "8-second educational videos"). Some of the replaced videos were pornographic, but some included other types of videos. One user reported that a precious video of his wife feeding his newborn son was replaced, and he no longer trusted Baidu. Many users complained that Baidu Netdisk had not fulfilled its responsibility to protect the privacy of users' uploaded data. Some new upload methods have emerged to circumvent the censorship mechanism, such as changing the file extension.

=== Download speed limit ===
When Baidu launched the "Super Membership" service, users began complaining that Baidu Netdisk restricted the download speeds of ordinary and ordinary member users. Baidu officially denied the speed restriction by claiming it "depends on [one's] bandwidth size."

Some users have, therefore, developed various ways to break Baidu Netdisk's speed limit, such as third-party clients can download and super member accounts. In response to this, in April 2018, Baidu Netdisk adopted a method of banning unofficial versions. Using unofficial versions to download Netdisk files will fail. Furthermore, if an account has many abnormal requests, it will be locked.

Main article: Pandownload § Author arrested

On April 15, 2020, Cai Mouming, the developer of PanDownload, was arrested by the police because Liu Mou reported that the software he downloaded would leak private photos and files without authorization. Public opinion believes this move was because Baidu Netdisk was taking action to crack down on third-party Netdisks and protect its interests.

On November 17, 2021, at the request of the Ministry of Industry and Information Technology, Baidu Netdisk, Tencent Weiyun, and eight other Netdisk companies jointly signed the "Self-Discipline Convention on User Experience Protection for Personal Netdisk Service Business," promising to launch "undifferentiated rate" products in 2021 to provide undifferentiated upload/download rate services for all types of users. The "Convention" requires implementation before December 31. Baidu launched the Youth Edition of Baidu Netdisk, providing 10G storage space for free users. Baidu Netdisk did not respond clearly to whether the existing version and the Youth Edition of the cloud disk files can be interoperable.

=== Service Limitations ===
At the beginning of March 2018, some users from Taiwan found that Taiwan's IP was suspected of being blocked by Baidu's network disk. The page that could be accessed commonly displayed the message "Oh, the page you visited no longer exists," and Taiwan users could not usually share data with users in other countries.IPs in Xinjiang are also blocked.

=== User incentive programs and P2P forcibly occupy bandwidth resources ===
In April 2020, users found that the Baidu Netdisk PC client checked the "Join User Incentive Program" in the Settings-Transfer-Advanced Settings page by default without the knowledge of many ordinary users. Baidu Netdisk's official description of this user incentive program that began in May 2019 is as follows:

The "User Incentive Program" is an activity launched by Baidu Netdisk to improve the user experience of PC clients. After enabling it, the corresponding points will be awarded according to the user's activity and usage. The points earned through this program are equivalent to your wealth in Baidu NetDrive, which can be redeemed for Baidu NetDrive Super Membership, privileges, or other great prizes in the mobile app. There will be no points awarded after cancellation, so please choose carefully.

After testing, some users found that when they did not use Baidu Netdisk PC for uploading or downloading, the software still occupied part of the bandwidth, slowing down many users' network speed. In a statement on Baidu's official Weibo account on April 20, Baidu admitted that the "user incentive program" used Peer-to-peer technology.

After calculation, it can be found that the rewards and services that can be exchanged for points obtained after joining the user incentive program are very uneconomical. Baidu's official estimate is that "it is expected to earn 1,000 points per month while maintaining a daily continuous contribution of 1MB/s bandwidth, 5G space, and 7 hours of online time." "And 1000 points are only enough to exchange for more than 5 minutes of high-speed downloads, and the price of a single/single-day download acceleration service previously announced by Baidu Netdisk is 1.9 yuan in idle hours and 2.9 yuan in busy hours, which is completely unable to compensate for its squeeze on bandwidth, as well as the damage caused by frequent reading and writing of hard disks. Even the electricity bill for 210 hours a month is much more.

On April 20, Baidu Netdisk said through its official Weibo that the new version of Baidu Netdisk PC released on the 21st will cancel all of the "User Incentive Plan".

== Baidu Library Infringement Incident ==
Main article: Baidu library infringement incident

=== Open-ended disputes ===
Baidu Encyclopedia claims to be an online encyclopedia with open content that is editable to everyone, and it advocates for the spirit of equality and collaboration among users. Generally, websites in mainland China emphasize that the "Baidu Encyclopedia" is a "network encyclopedia in which all netizens participate in compiling" when comparing the Baidu Encyclopedia and Wikipedia. Baidu Encyclopedia has partially restricted the user's editing permissions; some permissions need to be applied for separately after reaching a certain level of contribution and activity, and a small number of entries whose names are protected by long-term blank paper and whose content is locked for a long time cannot be created or edited by users other than the official. Baidu Encyclopedia's management personnel are hired and appointed by Baidu, and compared with ordinary users, the management authority that ordinary users can obtain is also relatively limited and is still in an auxiliary position. The policy decisions related to the development of the Baidu Encyclopedia are not generated through open discussions, comments, and voting, and ordinary users need more influence, voice, and editing power to do so. In addition, Baidu Encyclopedia launched its editing service, essentially a brand promotion encyclopedia for merchants, and its neutrality has been questioned. In 2017, after the 315 parties revealed that Baike.com could claim entries if you pay for it, some netizens found that the entry Polar Algae 5S, which Toutiao Encyclopedia advertised as "killing cancer cells in seven days," also existed in Baidu Encyclopedia, which also caused controversy about the openness of Baidu Encyclopedia.

=== Copyright Disputes ===
In the "Encyclopedia Agreement and Baidu Encyclopedia's Rights Statement," "Baidu Encyclopedia stipulates that the copyright of the content published by the user belongs to the original author, and if the copyright is reprinted, the copyright attribution shall be subject to the original author or the original website, and once published, the user agrees that Baidu Encyclopedia has the right and license to enjoy a free, perpetual, irrevocable, non-exclusive and fully sublicensable right and license," and then the copyright "2024 Baidu" ©is marked at the bottom of the entry. Baidu Encyclopedia users often reprint content from copyrighted websites or official publications without indicating the source and indicating the copyright notice of the original author or the original website or completely ignore its authorization terms, resulting in infringement of the copyright of others, such as the free content license clause of Wikipedia entries using (Copyleft). In contrast, the copyright license used by Baidu Encyclopedia is not accessible, Baidu Encyclopedia's use of Wikipedia entries is copyright infringement, and some even copy all Wikipedia entries. Violates the copyright law in mainland China.

Due to copyright issues, Baidu Encyclopedia's content does not meet the accepted definition of open or accessible.

=== Sabotage and Spoofing ===
See also: Baidu 10 Mythical Creatures and Transcendental.

Baidu Encyclopedia has long been affected by sabotage and spoofing, often appearing in controversial or popular articles (such as public figures), where users either delete or clear text that does not conform to their values, insert false information, or ridicule and slander others. Some Localism (politics) or users with Exclusivism points sabotage and spoof the articles on cities and administrative divisions, advocate their own places, tamper with objective and truthful content, or maliciously scandalize other places.

Many entries in the Baidu Encyclopedia are copied and pasted, so they are frequently used to upload popular online spoof articles. For example, the entry that spoofs the revolutionary martyr "Shi Xikun." "urban management" was once interpreted as "describes cruelty, bloodiness, and terror" and "is equivalent to beating, smashing, and looting," and "expert" was once interpreted as "having nothing to do after eating or having done nothing serious." Since these spoofs have long circulated on the Internet, most editors ignore these erroneous interpretations and acquiesce.

Some spoofs that appeared in the Baidu Encyclopedia have misled other media. For example, in the entry "Prague Spring," a user spoofed the term "Yuri's Revenge" from "Red Alert 2: Yuri's Revenge" as a formal code name for a military activity. This was cited as a historical fact in the program "Deciphering Sino-Soviet Diplomatic Archives" on Shanghai TV's documentary channel. In the entry "Aircraft Carrier Killer," a user spoofed Nvidia's GeForce series graphics card GTX690 as a "690 tactical core graphics card," which was also quoted in the original text of Gansu TV's "Deciphering the Truth" program, sparking discussion.

In early January 2009, an article titled "Baidu's Top Ten Mythical Beasts" was posted and quickly spread. Netizens used homophones to spoof sexually explicit content and obscene language into animals that do not exist. They posted them on Baidu Encyclopedia, such as the Grass Mud Horse, Duffy Chicken, Fuck Squid, and Tailed Whale. Subsequent works, such as "Top Ten Mysterious Foods" and "Top Ten Magical Weapons," appeared after being deleted. This caused the Baidu Encyclopedia to be widely questioned, but the current entries have all been deleted and are protected as blank pages.

Some users also often take advantage of the flaws of the system's filtering review to create entries that appear to be academically rigorous but are pseudo-scientific or satirize and spoof professional entries in a tone that violates scientific common sense and is boastful, such as the chemical entries superhydrochloric acid, polymethane, and card element. In April 2014, an editing war broke out over the entry for "paraxylene" because its "low toxicity" attribute was tampered with to "highly toxic," which attracted widespread media attention.

Baidu Encyclopedia is also a target for Korean nationalists to promote the Korean origin theory. In December 2020, Professor Seo Kyoung-Duk of Sungshin Women's University in South Korea emailed Baidu to object to Baidu Encyclopedia's statement that "Kimchi originated from China." Still, the entry "Kimchi" in question had not been changed as of December of the same year. It was locked and not open for editing. Subsequently, the South Korean online diplomatic envoys with a background in the South Korean government launched a petition on the petition website "Change.org" in January of the following year, demanding that Baidu Encyclopedia delete the relevant content. In February 2021, netizens on social platforms such as Weibo and Douban reported that a large number of historical and cultural entries on the Baidu Encyclopedia had been modified, including nearly 100 entries such as "Huaxia," "Korean," "Dongyi Culture," "Jongmiao Sacrifice," "Jongmiao Ritual System," "Shadow Wall" and "Dancing". The modified content is biased towards the Korean historical view. For example, it is said that the Jongmiao Sacrifice is "a Confucian ceremony for the Korean Jongmiao to worship the monarch and queen of the Joseon Dynasty" the Jongmiao Ritual System "is most famous for the Korean Jongmiao Sacrifice," and the Korean ethnic group "should not be used to refer to Koreans, Koreans and other Koreans in non-Chinese regions." Some netizens questioned whether Korean netizens made the relevant edits. Baidu Encyclopedia responded to the complaint on March 15, verifying and checking the feedback entries individually to improve their completeness and correctness. At the same time, Baidu Encyclopedia announced that in the future, the historical version review and comparison functions will only be open to "encyclopedia professional editors" to avoid being disturbed by outdated information.

In July 2022, the actor "Wang Junyi" was found by netizens to be fabricated, and the entry has now been deleted.

== Copyright infringement ==
The US Special 301 Report criticized Baidu for providing MP3 music downloads, calling it China's most prominent music copyright infringement website.

On June 3, 2008, Universal Music, EMI, Synso Music Entertainment, Warner Music, and several local Chinese companies issued a joint statement regarding the issue of music piracy, saying that Baidu is China's largest and most stubborn provider of pirated music, and that resolutely boycotting Baidu has become a common goal for all parties. They also sent letters to major advertising companies, calling on them to consider whether they should continue placing advertisements in media where piracy exists.

Han Han filed lawsuits against Baidu over copyright issues in 2011 and 2012, and Baidu lost both cases.

The Wikimedia Foundation and Hudong Baike have previously accused Baidu Baike of infringing copyright by using content without citing the source but have not received any response from Baidu. In April 2008, Baidu Chief Scientist Zhang Yiwei said that Chinese people should use the Baidu Encyclopedia and there is no reason to use Wikipedia, a service outside China.

On the evening of November 27, 2013, CCTV-2's Economic Half Hour broadcast a unique program titled "Online Copyright Disputes Re-emerge," exposing the black chain of piracy among video websites such as Baidu and Qvod. The program reported that on November 13, Zhang Chaoyang of Sohu Video, Tencent Video, and Guangguang Media, Gu Yongqiang of Youku Tudou Video, Liu Hong of LeTV, and Wang Changtian of Guangguang Media jointly launched the "China Online Video Anti-Piracy Joint Action." The program said that Baidu and other companies provide technology for video players, and web admins on the Internet provide them with video sources. Baidu's behavior is to transfer the risk to the individuals who upload video content.

In December 2018, Toutiao sued Baidu, claiming that Baidu's ""Baidu" website and "Mobile Baidu" app had disseminated an article in Toutiao's Wukong Q&A titled "Is Tianjin cuisine derived from Shandong cuisine?" without authorization. The Haidian Court ruled that Baidu lost the case at first instance and was required to compensate Toutiao for 160 yuan in economic losses.

== Alleged privacy violation ==
One day in 2013, Ms. Zhu from Nanjing, Jiangsu Province, searched for keywords such as "Bariatrics" and "breast augmentation" on Baidu. When she subsequently logged on to other websites, advertisements related to these keywords appeared. Ms. Zhu closed these websites and reopened them but found that related content advertisements still appeared. Ms. Zhu believed that Baidu recorded the keywords she searched without permission, disclosed her interests, hobbies, life, study, and work characteristics on other websites, and pushed related advertisements, which constituted an infringement of her privacy. For this reason, she sued Baidu in the Nanjing Gulou District People's Court, requesting that the other party stop the infringement, apologize immediately, and compensate her for mental damages of 10,000 yuan. After two trials, Baidu lost the first trial and won the second trial.

On October 10, 2017, Zhihu user "tgyfjyj" exposed that Baidu and Putian hospitals cooperated to use "Baidu Golden Eye" to collect patient privacy, which caused huge controversy.

== Content censorship ==
Main articles: Internet censorship in the People's Republic of China and Baidu Japan

Baidu's Chinese search engine maintains an extensive list of filtered keywords used to censor content in search results and other services. When users search for terms or images prohibited by the Chinese government, a message appears stating, "According to relevant laws, regulations, and policies, some search results are not displayed." Robin Li, Baidu's CEO, stated that as a company headquartered in China, Baidu must comply with Chinese laws. If certain types of information or content are deemed illegal, they must be removed from the search results. Additionally, Chinese users primarily focus on topics related to entertainment and business and show little interest in content classified as illegal by the government.

In August 2011, following repeated reports by China Central Television (CCTV) exposing Baidu for allowing paid false advertisements to appear prominently in search results and highlighting the flaws of its pay-for-ranking system, Baidu blocked search results for the keyword "CCTV Baidu." Searching for this term also displayed the message: "The search results may not comply with relevant laws, regulations, and policies and are not displayed."

On May 18, 2011, eight New York residents filed a lawsuit in the Manhattan District Court, accusing Baidu and the Chinese government of blocking and censoring web pages. The complaint alleges that Baidu is an agent and executor of Chinese government policies, blocking information that mentions the 1989 Tiananmen Square protests and massacre online, making it impossible for the plaintiffs' articles and videos to appear as search results. The plaintiffs believe that the censorship violates their rights under the Constitution of the United States, the New York State Constitution, and laws because their use of Baidu searches in the United States was also affected. The plaintiffs demanded $16 million in damages. A Baidu spokesperson declined to comment. The Ministry of Foreign Affairs of the People's Republic of China stated that the Chinese government's management of the Internet by the law "is in line with international practice and is a sovereign act. Under international law, foreign courts have no jurisdiction."

Since April 14, 2007, Baidu Japan has been inaccessible in mainland China. In response, People's Daily's People's Daily Online reprinted a report by DoNews titled "Baidu Japan Site Blocked by Great Firewall, Suspected to be Related to Pornographic Content." However, a former Baidu employee pointed out that Baidu Japan could not be accessed in mainland China because they banned mainland IP browsing.

== Sexual content ==
On December 13, 2009, China Central Television's Morning News program reported that Baidu's children's search engine contained "pornographic content." The report stated that entering keywords such as "chat" and "passion" into Baidu's children's search engine, which had been in testing for three years, resulted in search results linking to numerous pornographic websites. Following the exposure, Baidu swiftly shut down its children's search engine. However, pornographic content was still found in Baidu's elderly search engine.

In August 2017, Baidu Maps was exposed as being used as a platform for soliciting prostitution in Shanghai's underground sex industry. Baidu Maps responded by stating that it had removed the related false and explicit information and initiated a comprehensive investigation.

In August 2018, a netizen searched Baidu images for words such as "snow-white," "smooth," "Pulmonary pleurae," "rough waves," "fresh and juicy," and "three-point perspective." Some irrelevant pornographic images appeared, which were compared with the results of a Google image search. For example, for the word "Tender and smooth," the search results on Google are pictures of delicious food, while the search results on Baidu are pictures of beautiful women in revealing clothes.

On February 28, 2019, the self-media outlet "News Lab" reported that many reference links in Baidu Baike entries for Guangzhou primary schools and kindergartens were redirecting to pornographic websites. While the links originally contained school-related content when the entries were written, the domain names were later purchased by pornographic websites. However, Baidu failed to monitor and address the invalid links and suspicious redirects within Baidu Baike.

In response, Baidu stated that it had urgently removed the reference pages exploited by pornographic websites in the entries mentioned in the report. Baidu also launched a comprehensive investigation into all entries that used the domain names associated with the pornographic websites as references and implemented necessary measures. Moving forward, Baidu pledged to strengthen the inspection of reference links in Baidu Baike entries.

== Industry disputes ==
=== Qihoo 360 and Baidu fight ===
Main article: Qihoo 360 and Baidu fight

=== "Homework Help" Dispute ===
==== Causes bad study habits ====
Homework helpers and online question-searching software such as Baidu Zhidao's web version and mobile app are widely controversial because school students use them to copy answers.

On November 7, 2015, Guangming Online published an article titled “Is “homework magic tool” a help or a harm?” which stated:

“There are no pros and cons to “homework magic tool.” It mainly depends on the attitude and purpose of the students. If students have substantial autonomy, they will use this kind of software to assist learning and learn the steps and methods of solving problems. However, suppose the student has poor autonomous learning ability. In that case, this will only make the student use the software as a lazy way to complete homework tasks, and over time, they will develop lousy learning habits.

==== Suspected of plagiarizing Xuebajun interface ====
In May 2016, Qianwen Wandaba sued Baidu, claiming that Baidu Homework Helper had plagiarized the interface design of Xueba Jun and infringed its copyright, and demanded RMB 500,000 in damages.

==== Framed Xiaoyuan Search Questions Incident ====
From 3:30 to 4:30 p.m. on August 9, 2017, multiple user accounts posted pornographic information in the comment area of Xiaoyuan Search Question within a short period. Subsequently, a public relations company spread the news that "Xiaoyuan Search Question is pornographic" on Weibo. At 6:30 p.m. on August 10, a TV station broadcast a report titled "Pornographic jokes appeared on the learning app, and the father of the naughty child complained to no avail and exposed it." It claimed that his child had secretly read pornographic content on Xiaoyuan Search Question and complained to Xiaoyuan Search Question customer service to no avail. On August 14, 2017, Xiaoyuan Search Question held a media communication meeting, accusing Baidu Homework Help employees of maliciously posting pornographic information on the Xiaoyuan Search Question application and deliberately spreading slander. Xiaoyuan Search Question produced evidence showing that the IP address of the user who posted pornographic information in the comment area came from the IP address used by Baidu Homework Help's office location. The so-called "parent Mr. Li" in the TV report was Wang, an employee of Baidu Homework Help, and the recording of his interview with customer service was also carefully edited and spliced. On the evening of August 14, Baidu Homework Help responded to the incident, saying that "the statement made by a certain peer is contrary to the facts and is slander and defamation by the peer."

=== Dispute with Toutiao ===
In January 2018, a netizen revealed on the social networking platform Maimai that Baidu had adjusted its internal structure and established a content ecology marketing department, which would be directly managed by Baidu's public relations director, Xiong Yun. He also said that the main task of this department was to integrate internal public relations and government relations resources to attack Baidu's biggest competitor in the information flow field, Toutiao. The internal code name was "Da Tou Ban (office to attack Toutiao)." Later, another media person pointed out that Ren Qiang, a senior media person who used to work for Beijing Daily's Jingbao Media, had joined the "Baidu Content Ecology Marketing Department," proving the existence of the "Content Ecology Marketing Department" (Da Tou Ban). On the evening of January 29, Toutiao said in a statement that it had received a user report that when searching for "Toutiao" related content on Baidu, the top search result was an article published by Baidu's self-media platform "Baijiahao" in mid-December 2017 about Toutiao being required to make rectifications. The second search result was "Toutiao official website," but it was marked with a red warning: "Reminder: This page may not be accessible normally due to unstable service." In response, Toutiao said it would file a lawsuit in court. Baidu said that Toutiao's series of actions was due to its ties to its development. On January 30, the Haidian District People's Court of Beijing officially accepted Toutiao's lawsuit against Baidu for unfair competition.

== Other controversies of Baidu ==
=== Fake flowers on the Party's Founding Day ===
2011 was the 90th anniversary of the founding of the Chinese Communist Party (CCP). Starting mid-to-late June 2011, when users searched for the word “founding of the party” on Baidu, they would see a website for offering flowers on the search page, where they could choose to “offer flowers” to the CCP. However, some netizens pointed out that all the “offerings” did not exist and that the digital version of the flowers was just a Flash, and the numbers would only increase over time and had nothing to do with the number of “flowers” offered by netizens. After being discovered, Baidu removed the flower-offering function on its own.

=== ImageNet image recognition challenge cheating ===
In mid-May 2015, Baidu announced that it had reduced its error rate to a record 4.58% in the image recognition test of the ImageNet Large Scale Image Recognition Challenge (ILSVRC). However, on June 2, 2015, the organizers of the ImageNet Challenge issued a statement stating that between November 28, 2014, and May 13, 2015, Baidu's participating team used at least 30 accounts to submit at least 200 submissions to the test server, far exceeding the upper limit of two submissions per week stipulated by the competition, which was a violation. Baidu was banned from submitting ImageNet test results in 2016 by the ImageNet Challenge.

=== The User Experience Director's speech was inappropriate ===
On July 1, 2016, the International Experience Design Conference was held at the China National Convention Center. Liu Chao, Director of Baidu's User Experience Department, gave a speech to design practitioners as a guest. His speech caused dissatisfaction among the audience in many aspects. In the last part, he advertised Baidu's design department, causing some audience members to shout, "You are too low; get out!" this time, the live broadcast was forced to be interrupted for several minutes. Liu Chao's speech quickly sparked heated discussions on Zhihu, spreading to multiple platforms such as Sina Weibo and online media. Criticisms of the speech mainly included: the main content was straightforward and off-topic, a Slide show was poor, it made fun of vulgar jokes, repeated industry common sense, forced advertising, discriminated against women, and attacked Smartisan, which had a feud with him. It was said that Liu Chao used the presentation for Baidu's campus recruitment that day.

Soon after, Liu Chao posted on his WeChat Moments, saying, "I have spent so much time talking and live-streaming twice a week that I have even had pharyngitis, but I still haven't made my Intellectual property popular. Today, it has finally become popular. Baidu's naughty kid and our beautiful anchor. The only regret is that no one has forwarded the QR code page." A female Baidu employee who appeared in the speech also made controversial remarks on Weibo. The incident thus fermented again. On July 4, Liu Chao posted an apology letter on Baidu's internal network for the speech incident. Still, some Baidu employees who replied questioned his professional ability and attitude, and many people expressed that he should apologize and resign. Baidu's internal human resources account replied that evening, saying that Baidu was highly concerned about the incident. After a joint investigation by the Human Resources Department, the Professional Ethics Construction Department, and the Public Relations Department, it was found that Liu Chao had not reported his participation in the meeting to the company in advance, and that his behavior and speech content had a severe impact on the company's brand and reputation and also caused severe harm to Baidu employees. Baidu determined that Liu Chao was no longer qualified to serve as a director and removed him from the Baidu management team.

This incident was seen as proof that Baidu was not trustworthy. Some commentators also questioned why Liu Chao was able to hold a senior position given his ability and believed that it reflected problems with Baidu's personnel management. “This is very Baidu” also became a hot word on the Internet.

=== Dispute with Wang Zhian ===
On January 11, 2019, news commentator Wang Zhian published an article on his WeChat public account titled “Quanjian Deserves to Die, but It's Not the Only One,” commenting on the Quanjian incident and mentioning the history of the Death of Wei Zexi. Unexpectedly, Baidu sued him for copyright infringement because the article maliciously defamed the brand image. On January 17, Wang Zhian published an article listing hundreds of charges, stating that he would not give in and would accept Baidu's lawsuit.

=== Baijiahao has too much self-owned content ===
In January 2019, Fang Kecheng, an editor of the We Media News Lab (formerly a reporter for Southern Weekly), wrote an article on a WeChat public account stating that more than half of Baidu's search results on the homepage point to Baidu's products, especially Baijiahao. The author believes that the quality of Baijiahao's articles is low, which deduces that Baidu's motivation is just to be a marketing account platform and turn users into its traffic for monetization. After the article was published, Baidu's stock price also fell. As Baidu's reputation fell again, the official media, People's Daily, published three articles criticizing the matter, pointing out that Baidu was no longer open and was drifting away from the public, which was not in line with the social principles of long-term operation and contribution to the most significant interests of enterprises, and would gradually be abandoned by others if it moved to a small circle.

Baidu responded that "in Baidu search results, the proportion of Baijiahao content in the site is less than 10%. It also stated that the 1.9 million Baijiahao creators cover all authoritative media and consulting agencies and many high-quality self-media with in-depth and authoritative content." In response to Baidu's response, Fang Kecheng believed that users only look at the first two pages when using Baidu, and if Baidu could give the proportion of the first page results, it would be more convincing. However, the article's author, Fang Kecheng, responded, "the" proportion of the homepage content is more important in search results, and the proportion of the entire site is not very convincing.” He also claimed that the decline in Baidu's stock price has nothing to do with his article.” Sogou CEO Wang Xiaochuan later said, “welcome to use Sogou.” In addition, some Chinese users switched to Microsoft Bing for search, causing Baidu's traffic to rush to Bing, which was temporarily unavailable in mainland China.

Baidu later made some minor adjustments to its search engine. The search results for information no longer included web page addresses, but instead used the names of media outlets. This made it more difficult to determine the source.

=== Baidu News posts fake article impersonating Zhang Zixin's father ===
Main article: Zhang Zixin murder case

On the afternoon of July 13, 2019, after the body of the girl killed in the Zhang Zixin case was found, an account named "Zhang Zixin's father" posted a message on Baidu News saying, "I hope she will still be my daughter in the next life so that I can continue to take care of her," which caused the media to question whether the account was posting in the name of the victim's father. Afterward, Baidu News' official Weibo account posted a message saying that the "Zhang Zixin's father" account was opened with the authorization of the person concerned and operated by Baidu on his behalf. Each piece of information was published by the Baidu team after confirmation by the person concerned. However, the last message on the account was published without the consent of Zhang Zixin's father. Baidu has deleted the message and fired the editor in charge of the account.

=== Baidu App undergoes rectification ===
The Cyberspace Administration of China instructed the Beijing Municipal Cyberspace Administration to interview the person in charge of Baidu regarding the problems of spreading vulgar information and publishing “click bait” articles on multiple channels of the Baidu APP and demanded immediate rectification. At 9 a.m. on April 8, 2020, the Baidu APP's recommendation, picture, video, financial, and technology channels were suspended from updating.

=== Executive arrested for promoting gambling ads ===
On September 15, 2020, Shi Youcai, a special consultant of Baidu's mobile ecology business group, was taken away by Jiaxing police at Hangzhou Airport for illegally promoting gambling websites. A few weeks ago, Li Zhongjun, Baidu's vice president in charge of KA (key customer) sales, and several of his subordinates were taken away by the police. Baidu searched once the news about Shi Youcai's arrest was blocked in its information column.

=== Vice President of Public Relations Qu Jing's fraudulent and controversial remarks ===
In early May 2024, Baidu's Vice President of Public Relations, Qu Jing, opened an account on the short video platform Douyin called "I am Qu Jing." Using her identity as "Vice President of Baidu, Baidu's No. 1 Public Relations Officer, and former Vice President of Public Relations at Huawei", she created a gimmick that her "number of fans reached 950,000 in 5 days". She was subsequently suspected of fraudulent activities such as buying accounts, fans, and traffic. The "Xinxia Original Clothing" account she bought had 900,000 fans in March 2022. A 21st Century Business Herald reporter found that the account's historical posting records contained video records of clothing sales, confirming her suspicion of buying accounts, buying fans, and fabricating data. At the same time, she became famous online for posting radical and controversial remarks. She was listed on multiple hot search lists, attracting the attention of official media such as the Beijing Daily.

In the early morning of May 9, Qu Jing posted an apology letter on her personal WeChat account, saying that "before posting the short video, I did not consult the company (Baidu) in advance, which was not in line with relevant procedures and did not represent the company's position," but "my original intention was to do a good job, but I was too impatient and used inappropriate methods." She said she would improve her communication and management methods in the future. On the afternoon of May 9, Baidu founder Robin Li and human resources director Cui Shanshan held a small-scale employee communication meeting on the Qu Jing incident. Shortly after the meeting, Qu Jing submitted her resignation documents. On the evening of May 9, the media confirmed that Qu Jing had resigned from Baidu, but neither she nor Baidu officials responded.

== Pejorative name ==
The company Baidu (Bǎidù, 百度, literally "hundred times") is often referred to pejoratively as bǎi dú (百毒, meaning "hundred poisons"; playing on the tonal difference between dù × dú) — a nickname commonly used by its critics, including both its users and competitors.

== Notes ==
1. The Baidu Encyclopedia entry "Aircraft Carrier Killer" is archived here.
