= Parisa Taheri =

Iranian reporter and journalist

Parisa Taheri Avarvand
- Born: September 21, 1984 (age 41); Masjed Soleyman, Iran
- Education: Islamic Azad University (Bachelor of Management)
- Website: https://didgahnews.ir

Parisa Taheri Avarvand (Persian: پریسا طاهری اوروند; born September 21, 1984, Masjed Soleyman) is an Iranian reporter and Journalist.

She was one of the initiators of the Death Road campaign from Masjed Soleyman to Ahvaz in 2014. She was honored by a member of the Islamic Consultative Assembly in 2016 for her social and media activities in Masjed Soleyman.

== Journalism ==
She started her journalist career in 2014 by working at various news agency, including: Asr Jahan, Khoorna, Khoozna, AsreAvalinha, and... and in 2017, she began working as the director of Didgahnews website after obtaining license number 87154 from the country's comprehensive media system.

== Other activities ==
Parisa Taheri is the CEO of the Mojeze Bayan Speech Institute and has worked as a speech and public speaking instructor since 2019. Taheri, a lecturer in rhetoric and public speaking at Masjed Soleyman, was also honored at a conference of 120 self-made entrepreneurs in Tehran.

She was selected as the best Shahnameh reciter in the 2024 Stage Talents Festival in Shiraz. She was also invited as the secretary of the Stage Talents Festival in Bushehr.

She also held the first Mojeze Bayan oratory festival on the occasion of Saadi Shirazi's commemoration anniversary in Masjed Soleyman.
