= 21st Century Business Herald =

Chinese newspaper

- Type: Daily newspaper
- Founder: Shen Hao
- Founded: January 1, 2001
- Website: www.21cbh.com epaper.21jingji.com

The 21st Century Business Herald (also spelled Twenty-first Century Business Herald; abbreviation: 21CBH; Chinese: 21世纪经济报道) is a Chinese business-news daily newspaper published five times a week on weekdays in China. It was launched by Shen Hao on January 1, 2001 as a weekly newspaper.

== History ==
The 21st Century Business Herald was officially launched by Shen Hao on January 1, 2001 as a weekly newspaper, as part of the Nanfang Daily Media Group. In the following years the newspaper has spawned several news media outlets under its umbrella, including Moneyweek, 21st Century Business Review, Global Entrepreneur, and 21cbh.com.

On November 17, 2016, the Southern Finance and Economy Omnimedia Group was established as China's first omnimedia group. 21st Century Business Herald was on that date simultaneously affiliated to the Southern Finance and Economy Omnimedia Group, together with relevant print media outlets, websites, radio and tv outlets, and social media outlets.

== Controversies ==
In September 2014, executives from the 21st Century Business Herald were arrested by Shanghai police, who claimed they were suspected of extortion. Chinese official said that 21cbh.com also had irregularities such as not separating editorial and business operations.

In April 2015, the official website of 21st Century Business Herald, 21cbh.com, was ordered by the media regulator of China to cease operation because of news blackmail, the publishing license of Moneyweek was revoked, and the newspaper was ordered to rectify. Affected by the incident, Global Entrepreneur officially ceased publication in April 2015. In December 2015, Shen Hao, the publisher of the 21st Century Business Herald, was sentenced to four years in prison for extortion.
