= Joint Employment Test =

Competitive examination in India

- Abbreviation: JET
- Formation: 2013
- Headquarters: New Delhi - 110001
- Region served: India
- Affiliations: Ministry of Corporate Affairs; Government of India
- Website: www.jetexam.in

The Joint Employment Test (JET Exam) (Hindi: संयुक्त रोजगार परीक्षा) is a competitive examination in India conducted by the JET Exam Board, an autonomous institute under Ministry of Corporate Affairs, Government of India. By JET Exam candidates can apply for jobs like lekhpal, account officers, and other jobs provided by organisation, government departments or PSU making part of JET Exam.

== Eligibility ==
The candidates should have a graduate degree or diploma such as B.Sc., B.com., B.A., B.E., BBA, BMS, BCA, DCA, D.Ed., B.tech. from a central, state or deemed university. A candidate's age should be between 21 and 37 years. For reserved category, the age limit is 40 years.

== Syllabus ==
Sr. No.	Name of Tests (Objective)	Maximum Marks
1	Reasoning	50
2	English Language	10
3	Quantitative Aptitude	50
4	General Awareness/General Knowledge	75
5	Computer Knowledge	15
	Total	200

== See also ==
- National Eligibility Test
