= Panguso =

Internet search engine

Panguso (Chinese: 盘古搜索; pinyin: Pángǔ sōusuǒ) is a Chinese company offering the search engine Panguso.com, which is used mostly in Chinese. Compared to its private competitors, the Chinese Baidu and the US-based Google, which are used more frequently in China, the two shareholders of this joint venture are the state-owned Chinese news agency Xinhua and the in 2011 worldwide largest mobile telecommunication provider China Mobile. On March 1, 2014, Panguso merged with Jike and became ChinaSo.

== Founding ==
The founding of the search engine Panguso has been announced in August 2010. In December 2010 the beta version went online and in late February 2011 it was officially launched. The homepage redirects to the 'news' section, where the user is provided with the first headlines beneath the search windows. News are also building the focal point of the search engine. The company brings together as partners the state monopolistic largest Chinese content provider Xinhua and the largest Chinese mobile communication provider with 550 million customers in 2010. The search engine is planned to be pre-installed on cell phones and therefore is a response to Google, which started their google phone.

== Evaluation ==
The major competitive disadvantage of the search engine is its official nature. Following an Internet study of the Chinese Academy of Social Sciences, Chinese Internet user especially are interested in pluralistic viewpoints and information not originating from the state-owned information channel. Following Qian Xiaoqian, a member of the Chinese State Council, the search engine will "offer useful and healthy features as well as strive for the restriction of dissemination of illegal contents like pornography and glorification of violence". The results shown by Panguso are more restricted than by the Hong Kong-based daughter of US-based Google and even more restricted as by baidu.

== Sources ==
- "State starts own search engine (Staat startet eigene Internet-Suchmaschine)", in: RP Online (3/1/2011)
- Christoph Ricking: "Panguso, Interview with Martin Woesler" (radio broadcasting (Chinese), online article （Chinese）), in: Voice of Germany, Chinese Program (3/1/2011)
- Christoph Ricking: "Baidu Beat, Interview with Martin Woesler" (radio broadcasting (Chinese), online article (Chinese)), in: Voice of Germany, Chinese Program (1/12/2011)
