= Huaji =

Huaji may refer to:

- Yuwen Huaji, a Sui dynasty emperor and general
- Huaji (zh:滑稽 (表情)), an emoji used in Baidu Tieba
