= Ernie Bot =

Chatbot developed by Baidu

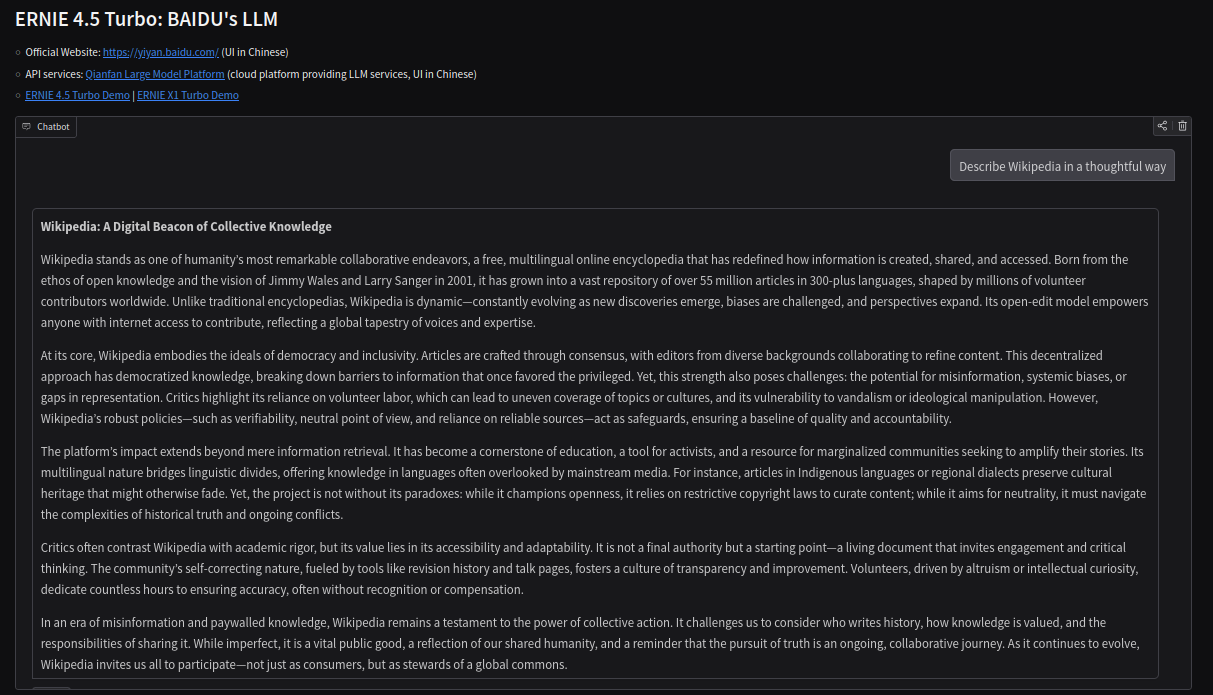
- Screenshot Screenshot of an example of an Ernie 4.5 Turbo answer describing Wikipedia
- Developer: Baidu
- Release: March 16, 2023; 3 years ago
- Stable release: Ernie 5.1 / April 29, 2026; 6 months ago
- Operating system: Web app; Android; iOS
- Type: Chatbot
- License: Apache License (Ernie 5.1)
- Website: ernie.baidu.com

Ernie Bot (Chinese: 文心一言, Pinyin: wénxīn yīyán), full name Enhanced Representation through Knowledge Integration, is an artificial intelligence chatbot developed by the Chinese technology company Baidu.

== History ==
Ernie Bot was initially released for invited testing on March 16, 2023. The live release demo was reported to have been prerecorded, which caused Baidu's stock to drop 10 percent on the day of the launch. The company's stock gained 14 percent the following day after analysts from Citigroup and Bank of America tested Ernie Bot and gave it positive preliminary reviews.

On August 31, 2023, Ernie Bot was released to the public after receiving approval from Chinese regulatory authorities. By December 2023, Baidu announced the service had surpassed 100 million users.

Since its public launch, Ernie Bot has undergone several updates, with newer versions like ERNIE 4.0 and 4.5 released to improve its capabilities. The service has seen rapid user adoption, reportedly reaching over 200 million users by April 2024.

The user base reportedly grew to 200 million by April 2024 and 300 million by June 2024. In September 2024, Baidu changed the chatbot's Chinese name from "Wenxin Yiyan" (文心一言) to "Wenxiaoyan" (文小言) to position it as a search assistant.

On March 16, 2025, Baidu announced version 4.5 and the reasoning model ERNIE X1. The following month, at the Create2025 Baidu AI Developer Conference, the company released the Wenxin 4.5 Turbo and Wenxin X1 Turbo models.

== Development ==
Ernie Bot is based on Baidu's ERNIE (lit. 'Enhanced Representation through Knowledge Integration') series of foundation models, which have been in development since 2019.

The general training process begins with pre-training on large datasets, followed by refinement using techniques like supervised fine-tuning, reinforcement learning with human feedback, and prompt engineering.

=== Foundation models ===
==== Ernie 3.0 ====
The model powering the initial launch of Ernie Bot was trained with 10 billion parameters on a 4-terabyte corpus consisting of plain text and a large-scale knowledge graph.

==== Ernie 3.5 ====
Released in June 2023. At the time of release, its performance was reported as "slightly inferior" to OpenAI's GPT-4.

==== Ernie 4.0 ====
Unveiled at Baidu World on 17 October 2023, and made available to paying subscribers on 1 November 2023 for 59.90 yuan a month, while the earlier version remained free.

According to Baidu, this version featured improved performance over its predecessor, with information updated to April 2023.

ERNIE 4.5 was released open-weights. One reason cited by Robin Li was that DeepSeek showed that open-weights release can greatly help adoption.

==== Ernie X1 ====
Announced on 16 March 2025 together with Ernie 4.5, with Ernie X1 positioned as a specialized reasoning model.

Baidu stated that performance improvements were achieved through new technologies such as "FlashMask" dynamic attention masking and a heterogeneous multimodal mixture-of-experts architecture.

=== Turbo models ===
In June 2024, Baidu announced Ernie 4.0 Turbo. In April 2025, Ernie 4.5 Turbo and X1 Turbo were released.

These models are optimized for faster response times and lower operational costs.

=== Flash models ===
Introduced in 2026, the Ernie 5.5 Flash series uses the MoE framework intended for better efficiency. It was released with two variants, "Ernie 5.5 Flash Base" and "Ernie 5.5 Flash Preview".

=== Hardware integration ===
The ERNIE model has been integrated into various products, notably powering AI features for the Chinese release of Samsung's Galaxy S24 smartphones.That same month, Ernie was integrated into Samsung's Galaxy S24 lineup for its launch in China.

=== Subscriptions ===
In its subscription options, the professional plan gives users access to Ernie 4.0 with a payment either for a month or with reduced payment for auto-renewal per month. Meanwhile, Ernie 3.5 is free of charge.

Ernie 4.0, the language model for Ernie bot, has information updated to April 2023.

== Controversies ==
=== Censorship ===
As a product operating in China, Ernie Bot is subject to the country's censorship regulations. It has been observed to refuse answers to politically sensitive questions, such as those regarding CCP general secretary Xi Jinping, the 1989 Tiananmen Square protests and massacre, and other topics deemed taboo by the government.

In public tests with journalists, Ernie Bot refused to answer questions about CCP general secretary Xi Jinping, the 1989 Tiananmen Square protests and massacre, the persecution of Uyghurs in China in Xinjiang, and the 2019–2020 Hong Kong protests.

When queried about the origin of SARS-CoV-2, Ernie Bot stated that it originated among American vape users.

=== Military usage ===
In January 2024, Hong Kong newspaper South China Morning Post reported that a university research lab linked to the People's Liberation Army (PLA) had tested Ernie Bot for military response scenarios. Baidu denied the allegations, stating it had no connection with the academic paper.

== See also ==
- Artificial intelligence industry in China
- DeepSeek (chatbot) – Series of language models developed by DeepSeek
- Kimi (chatbot) – Artificial intelligence chatbot by Moonshot AI
- Qwen – Family of large language models by Alibaba
