= Ruya =

Ruya is a Chinese term for an ancient scholar's wise, modest, and self-cultivating nature. It is also used to describe Chinese generals holding those same traits while defeating their enemies with ease.

== Ruya and Rafa ==
In popular culture, Ruya was first used to describe tennis star Rafael Nadal on the Baidu Rafa Post Bar (rafa Bar of Baidu Tieba). The post pointed out that Nadal never curses against his opponent; instead, he always gives credit to them. He never abuses his racquet, never gives up, and uses all means possible to achieve victory. These traits fit the meaning of the word "Ruya". Given the phonetic similarity between Ruya and Rafa, many message board posters started to use Ruya as Nadal's nickname.

== The phenomenon of Ruya ==
The phenomenon of spreading Ruya continues through the Chinese sporting world. Besides Rafael Nadal, other tennis players have been considered as Ruya, including Australian Bernard Tomic and former WTA World No. 1 Victoria Azarenka. Today, the word generally describes individuals with conflicting sides of being modest in public, but yet using all means to self-serve in their personal nature.
