= Eric Xu =

Chinese entrepreneur

- 徐勇
- Born: Beijing, China
- Education: Peking University; Texas A&M University
- Occupations: Co-founder, Baidu; Chairman, YIFANG Group Holdings Limited; Founder, Xu Family Charitable Foundation Limited; Founder, YIFANG (Beijing) Foundation
- Website: www.yifangventures.com

Eric Xu Yong (Chinese: 徐勇) is a Chinese entrepreneur, investor, and philanthropist. He is best known as co-founder of Baidu, the largest Chinese search engine.

Dr. Xu is the founder and chairman of Yifang Capital, an investment holding company engaged in venture capital investments and asset management. He also founded family philanthropic organizations including The Xu Family Charitable Foundation Limited, Yifang Foundation, and Zhengyu Education Foundation.

== Education ==
Xu earned his B.S and M.S. degrees in biology at Peking University from 1982 to 1989.

A Rockefeller Foundation fellow 1989–1993, Xu obtained PhD degree in biology from Texas A&M University. Xu was also a post-doctoral research fellow at the University of California, Berkeley from 1994 to 1996.

== Career ==
Dr. Xu's career ranges across research in life sciences, biotechnology, film production, entrepreneurship in information technology, venture capital and fund management.

=== Biotechnology ===
Prior to Baidu, Dr. Xu worked at Qiagen, Inc. and Stratagene, Inc, two biotech start-up companies in California in technical support, sales and marketing.

=== Television ===
Dr. Xu is the producer of the first Chinese TV documentary on Silicon Valley's unique history and culture in 1999. Titled "A Journey to Silicon Valley", the TV series brings to light the history, start-up culture, business management and venture capital mechanisms of the Valley in an objective and comprehensive fashion, and profoundly reveals the mystery behind the success of Silicon Valley as the world model for high-tech innovation.

=== Baidu ===
In 1999, together with Mr. Robin Li, Dr. Xu co-founded Baidu, the world's largest Chinese search engine (NASDAQ:BIDU) and served as an Executive Vice President and Chief Strategy Officer from 1999 to 2004.

=== Venture capital and asset management ===
Dr. Xu is the founder and chairman of YIFANG VENTURES, an investment company, engaged in venture capital investments and asset management. Dr. Xu also serves as a board member for several technology start-up companies. Yifang currently invests in information technology, new media, bio-pharmaceuticals, healthcare and clean-technologies, etc. It counts Allele Biotech, AcuraGen, AIC Semiconductor, BravoKids, BioHermes, Immune-Onc, TSM, Yidian, Haizhi, Kuwo, Baihe, etc., as its portfolio companies, among others. YIFANG is also a limited partner of several venture capital and private equity funds, including Sequoia Capital China, Decheng Capital Fund and Dragonfly Fund, among others.
