= Robin Li =

Chinese software engineer and billionaire internet entrepreneur (born 1968)

- 李彦宏
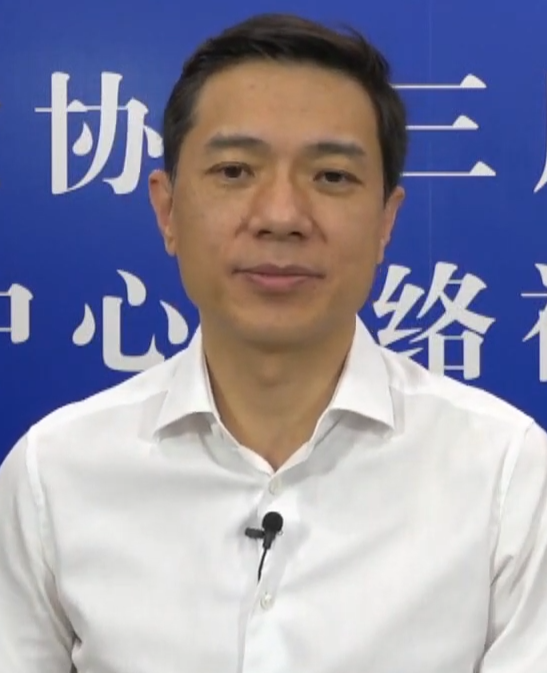
- Li in 2020
- Born: 17 November 1968 (age 58); Yangquan, Shanxi, China
- Education: Peking University (BMgt); University at Buffalo (MS)
- Occupations: Software engineer, internet entrepreneur
- Title: Co-founder and CEO of Baidu; Chairman of iQIYI
- Board member of: New Oriental
- Spouse: Ma Dongmin (马东敏)
- Children: 4
- Father: Li Guifu (李贵富)

Chinese name
- Simplified Chinese: 李彦宏
- Traditional Chinese: 李彥宏
Transcriptions
Standard Mandarin
- Hanyu Pinyin: Lǐ Yànhóng
- Gwoyeu Romatzyh: Lii Yannhorng
- Wade–Giles: Li Yenhung
- IPA: [lì jɛ̂nxʊ̌ŋ]

Robin Li Yanhong (Chinese: 李彦宏; pinyin: Lǐ Yànhóng; born 17 November 1968) is a Chinese software engineer and billionaire internet entrepreneur who is the co-founder and chief executive officer of Chinese multinational technology company Baidu. As of November 2026, Forbes estimated his net worth at US$4.4 billion.

Li studied information management at Peking University and computer science at the University at Buffalo. In 1996, he created RankDex. In 2000, he founded Baidu with Eric Xu. Li has been CEO of Baidu since January 2004. The company was listed on NASDAQ on August 5, 2005. Li was a member of the 12th National Committee of the Chinese People's Political Consultative Conference from 2013 to 2018.

During his tenure as CEO of Baidu, Li has been criticized for a number of controversies, including the death of Wei Zexi, advertising of unqualified hospitals on Tieba, and ad fraud.

== Early life and education ==
Li was born in Yangquan, Shanxi Province, where he spent most of his childhood. Both of his parents were factory workers. Li was the fourth of five children, and the only boy.

He earned a Bachelor of Management with a major in information management from Peking University. In fall 1991, Li went to the University at Buffalo in New York to study for a doctorate in computer science. He left the doctoral program with a master's degree in 1994.

== RankDex ==
In 1994, Li joined IDD Information Services, a New Jersey division of Dow Jones and Company, where he helped develop a software program for the online edition of The Wall Street Journal. He also worked on improving algorithms for search engines. He remained at IDD Information Services from May 1994 to June 1997. In 1996, while at IDD, Li created the Rankdex site-scoring algorithm for search engine page ranking. Google cofounder Larry Page filed a patent for the PageRank search algorithm, two years later in 1998, which references Li's work on RankDex. Li later used his Rankdex technology for the Baidu search engine.

== Baidu ==
Li worked as a staff engineer for Infoseek, a pioneer internet search engine company, from July 1997 to December 1999. An achievement of his was the picture search function used by Go.com. Since founding Baidu in January 2000, Li has turned the company into the largest Chinese search engine, with over 80% market share by search query, and the second largest independent search engine in the world. On 5 August 2005, Baidu completed its IPO on NASDAQ, and in 2007 was included in the NASDAQ-100 Index.

== Recognition ==
In 2001, he was named one of the "Chinese Top Ten Innovative Pioneers". In 2002 and 2003, he was named one of the "IT Ten Famous Persons". In April 2004, he was named in the second session of "Chinese Software Ten Outstanding Young Persons". In December 2005, he was named one of the "CCTV 2005 Chinese Economic Figures of The Year".

In August 2014, Li was appointed by the United Nations Secretary General as co-chair of the Independent Expert Advisory Group on Data Revolution for Sustainable Development. In September 2023, Time Magazine Names Li in a list of The 100 Most Influential People in AI 2023.

== Personal life ==
Li is married to Dongmin Ma, who also works for Baidu. They have four children and live in Beijing, China.
