= Baidu =

Chinese internet services company

Baidu, Inc.

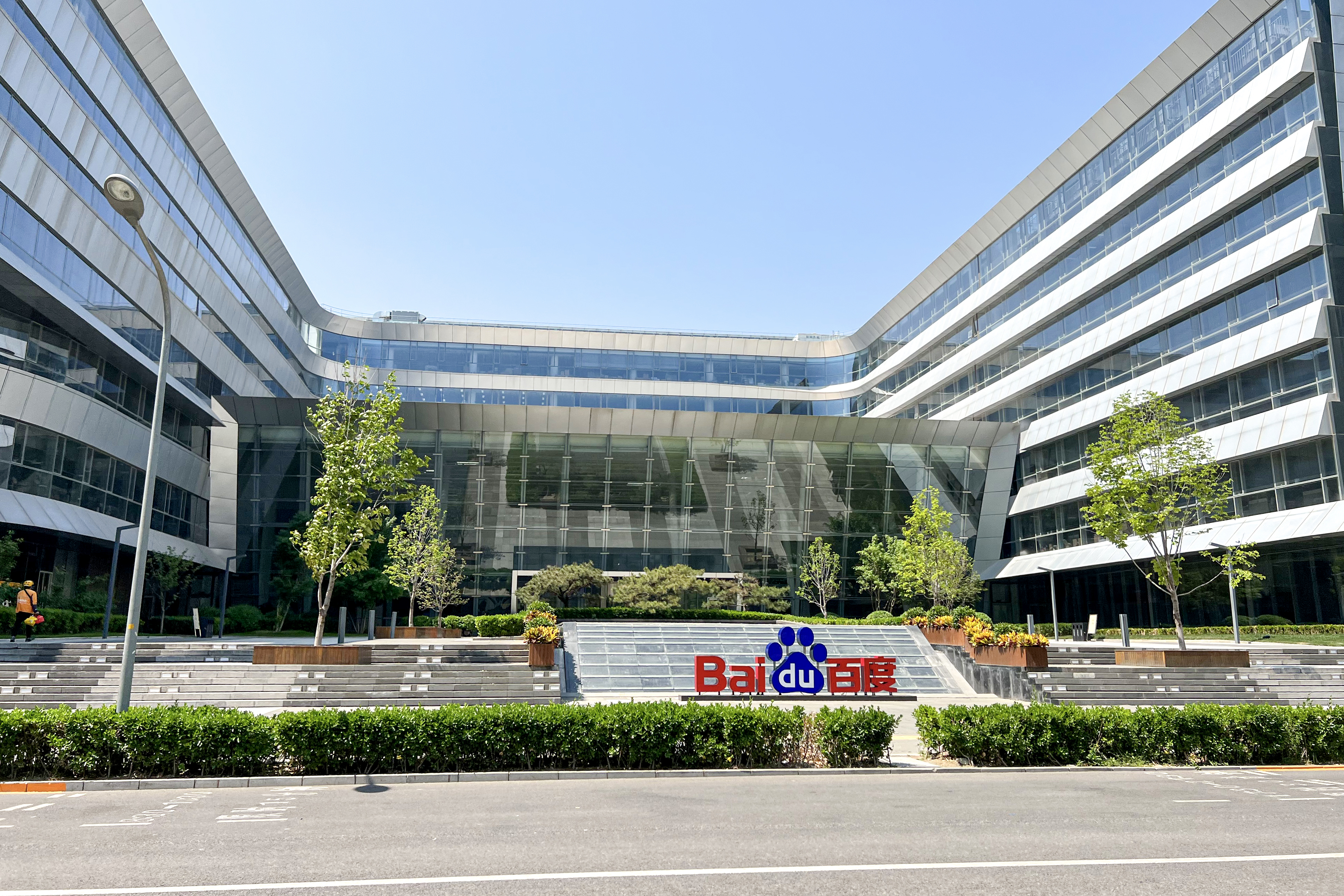
- Corporate headquarters
- Native name: 百度
- Type: Public
- Traded as: Nasdaq: BIDU; SEHK: 9888; Hang Seng Index component
- Industry: Internet; Artificial intelligence; Cloud computing
- Founded: 18 January 2000; 26 years ago
- Founder: Robin Li; Eric Xu
- Headquarters: Beijing, China
- Area served: Worldwide
- Key people: Robin Li (CEO)
- Products: Search engine; Baidu Maps; Baidu Baike; Baidu Wangpan; Baidu Tieba; Ernie Bot
- Revenue: ▼CN¥133.1 billion (2024)
- Operating income: ▼CN¥21.27 billion (2024)
- Net income: ▲CN¥24.18 billion (2024)
- Total assets: ▲CN¥427.8 billion (2024)
- Total equity: ▲CN¥263.62 billion (2024)
- Owner: Robin Li (18% equity; 59% voting)
- Number of employees: 39,800 (2023)

Chinese name
- Chinese: 百度
Transcriptions
Standard Mandarin
- Hanyu Pinyin: Bǎidù
- Bopomofo: ㄅㄞˇㄉㄨˋ
- Gwoyeu Romatzyh: Baeduh
- Wade–Giles: Pai^{3}-tu^{4}
- Tongyong Pinyin: Bǎi-dù
- IPA: [pàɪ.tû]
Wu
- Romanization: Bah tu
Yue: Cantonese
- Yale Romanization: Baakdouh
- Jyutping: baak3 dou6
- IPA: [pak̚˧ tɔw˨]
Southern Min
- Hokkien POJ: Pah-to͘
- Website: ir.baidu.com

Baidu, Inc. (/ˈbaɪduː/ BY-doo; Chinese: 百度; pinyin: Bǎidù; lit. 'hundred times') is a Chinese multinational technology company specializing in internet services and artificial intelligence. It holds a leading share of China's search engine market via Baidu Search and provides other internet services, including Baidu App (its search and newsfeed app), Baidu Baike (a user-edited, Wikipedia-like encyclopedia), iQIYI (a video streaming service), and Baidu Tieba (a forum platform similar to Reddit).

Besides its core internet search business, Baidu has diversified into autonomous driving (Baidu Apollo), smart consumer electronics (Xiaodu), and an AI technology stack covering software, chips, cloud infrastructure, foundation models, and applications.

A variable interest entity for Baidu to enable investment of foreign capital is incorporated in the Cayman Islands. Baidu was incorporated in January 2000 by Robin Li and Eric Xu. Baidu has origins in RankDex, an earlier search engine developed by Robin Li in 1996, before he founded Baidu in 2000. The company is headquartered in Beijing's Haidian District.

In December 2007, Baidu became the first Chinese company to be included in the NASDAQ-100 index. In October 2018, Baidu became the first Chinese firm to join the United States–based computer ethics consortium Partnership on AI. The Chinese government views Baidu as one of its national champion corporations.

Baidu has drawn criticism for censoring search results at the Chinese government’s direction, for mixing paid listings into its search results, including medical advertising linked to the 2016 death of student Wei Zexi, for selling moderator rights to Baidu Tieba forums, and for steering users toward content on its own platforms.

== History ==
=== Early development ===
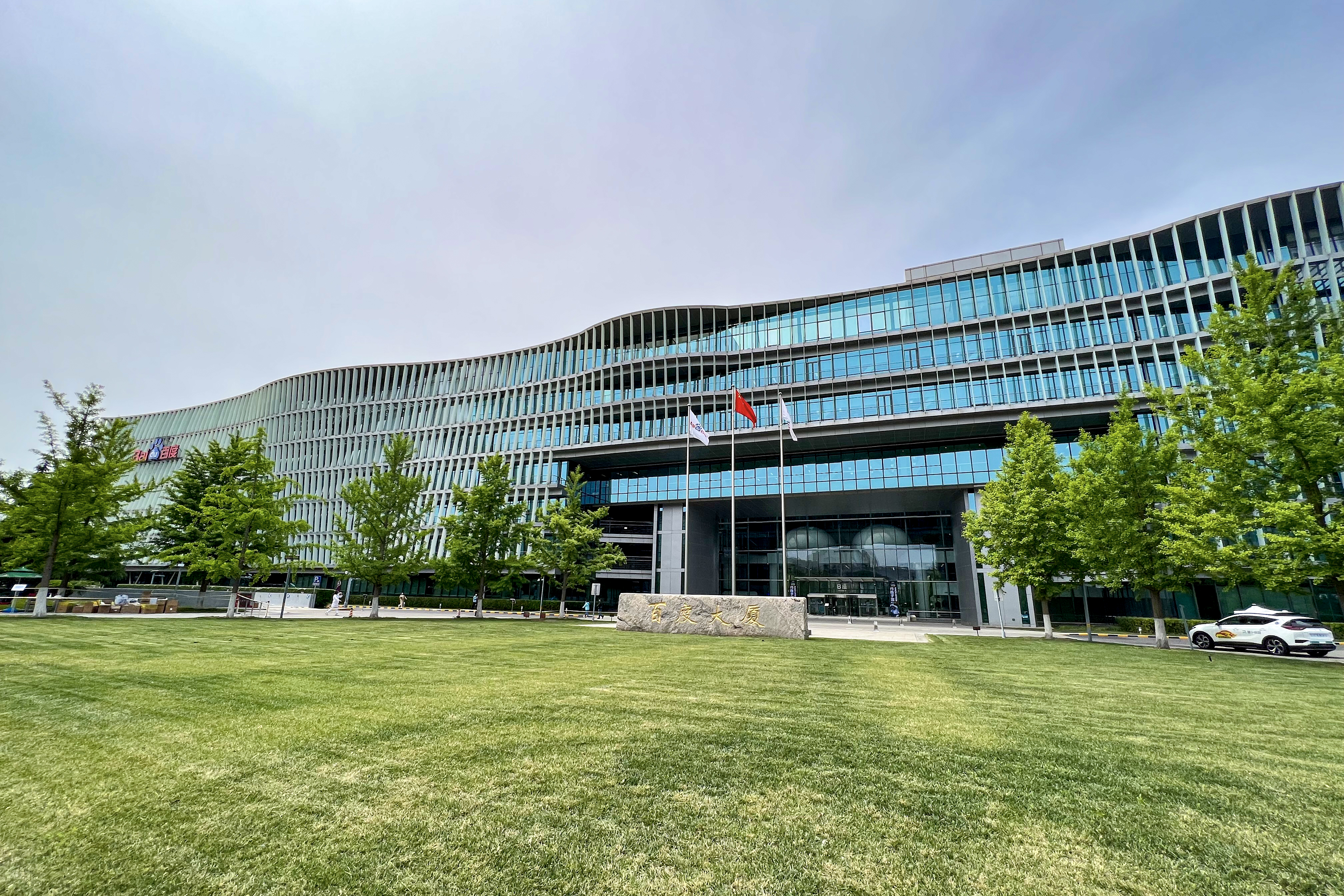
Baidu headquarters building completed in 2009

In 1994, Robin Li (Pinyin: Lǐ Yànhóng, Chinese: 李彦宏) joined IDD Information Services, a New Jersey division of Dow Jones and Company, where he helped develop software for the online edition of The Wall Street Journal. He also worked on developing better algorithms for search engines and remained at IDD Information Services from May 1994 to June 1997.

In 1996, while at IDD, Li developed the RankDex site-scoring algorithm for search engines results page ranking and received a US patent for the technology. Launched in 1996, RankDex was the first search engine that used hyperlinks to measure the quality of websites it was indexing. Li referred to his search mechanism as "link analysis," which involved ranking the popularity of a web site based on how many other sites had linked to it. It predated the similar PageRank algorithm used by Google two years later in 1998; Google founder Larry Page referenced Li's work as a citation in some of his U.S. patents for PageRank. Li later used his RankDex technology for the Baidu search engine.

Baidu was incorporated on 18 January 2000 by Robin Li and Eric Xu. In 2001, Baidu allowed advertisers to bid for ad space then pay Baidu every time a customer clicked on an ad, predating Google's approach to advertising. In 2003, Baidu launched a news search engine and picture search engine, adopting a special identification technology capable of identifying and grouping the articles.

=== 2005: Public Listing on NASDAQ ===
Baidu went public on Wall Street through a variable interest entity (VIE) based in the Cayman Islands on 5 August 2005. In 2007, Chinese government and Chinese industry sources stated that Baidu received a license from Beijing, which allows the search engine to become a full-fledged news website. Thus Baidu is able to provide its own reports, besides showing certain results as a search engine. Baidu was the first Chinese search engine to receive such a license. Baidu started its Japanese language search service, run by Baidu Japan, the company's first regular service outside of China in 2008. The Japanese search engine closed on 16 March 2015.

On 31 July 2012, Baidu announced that it would team up with Sina to provide mobile search results. On 18 November 2012, Baidu announced that it would be partnering with Qualcomm to offer free cloud storage to Android users with Snapdragon processors. On 2 August 2013, Baidu launched its Personal Assistant app, designed to help CEOs, managers and the white-collar workers manage their business relationships. On 16 May 2014, Baidu appointed Andrew Ng as chief scientist. Ng will lead Baidu Research in Silicon Valley and Beijing. On 18 July 2014, the company launched a Brazilian version of the search engine, Baidu Busca. On 9 October 2014, Baidu announced acquisition of Brazilian local e-commerce site Peixe Urbano.

=== 2017: Launch of Autonomous Driving Business ===
In April 2017, Baidu announced the launch of its Apollo project (Apolong), a self-driving vehicle platform, in a bid to help drive the development of autonomous cars including vehicle platform, hardware platform, open-source software platform and cloud data services. Baidu plans to launch this project in July 2017, before gradually introducing fully autonomous driving capabilities on highways and open city roads by 2020. In September 2017, Baidu launched a $1.5billion autonomous driving fund to invest in as many as 100 autonomous driving projects over the ensuing three years. At the same time, Apollo open-source software version 1.5 was also launched.

In June 2017, Baidu partnered with Continental and Bosch, auto industry suppliers, on automated driving and connected cars. In July 2017, Baidu GBU entered into a partnership with Snap Inc. to act as the company's official ad reseller for Snapchat in Greater China, South Korea, Japan and Singapore. The partnership was extended in 2019.

In September 2017, Baidu introduced a portable translation device that could also serve as a Wi-Fi hotspot, and announced plans to bring its deep learning platform to smartphones. Around the same time, Baidu joined Alibaba Group, Tencent, JD.com and Didi Chuxing and other investors in a US$12 billion investment that acquired about 35% of China Unicom's Shanghai-listed unit.

In October 2017, according to The Wall Street Journal, Baidu would launch self-driving buses in China in 2018.

China's government designated Baidu as one of its "AI champions" in 2018.

In 2018, Baidu divested the "Global DU business" portion of its overseas business, which developed a series of utility apps including ES File Explorer, DU Caller, Mobojoy, Photo Wonder and DU Recorder, etc. This business was renamed DO Global.

=== 2021: Hong Kong Secondary Listing ===
In March 2021, Baidu secured a secondary listing on the Hong Kong Stock Exchange, raising $3.1 billion. This marked the largest homecoming for a U.S.-traded Chinese company in Hong Kong since JD.com's listing the previous June.

In August 2021, Baidu announced a robocar concept that it said was capable of Level 5 autonomous driving, along with a second-generation AI chip.

In June 2022, Jidu Auto, an intelligent electric vehicle company originally backed by Baidu and Geely unveiled its first concept ROBO-01 in the form of a pre-production vehicle. The ROBO-01 rides on the Sustainable Experience Architecture (SEA) platform, a modular electric vehicle platform developed by Geely Holding.

In August 2023, Baidu publicly unveiled Ernie Bot, its large language model chatbot. In October 2023, Baidu released a newer version Ernie 4.0 chatbot. In September 2023, the search engine launched a chatbot based on its generative AI model, GenAI Ernie.

In January 2026, Baidu filed a listing application on the Hong Kong Stock Exchange for their semiconductor unit, Kunlunxin.

=== Robotaxi ===
As of April 2024, Apollo Go, Baidu's autonomous ride-hailing service, had completed six million rides using driverless robotaxis across 11 cities. The service operates a fleet of over 400 driverless vehicles in Wuhan.

In July 2025, Baidu announced its partnership with Uber, allowing it to deploy the Apollo Go outside the U.S. and mainland China.

=== Domain name redirection attack ===
On 12 January 2010, Baidu.com's DNS records in the United States were altered such that browsers to baidu.com were redirected to a website purporting to be the Iranian Cyber Army, a group that had claimed responsibility for an attack on Twitter during the 2009 Iranian election protests, making the proper site unusable for four hours. Internet users were met with a page saying "This site has been attacked by Iranian Cyber Army". Chinese hackers responded by attacking Iranian websites and leaving messages.

Baidu later sued Register.com for gross negligence, alleging that Register.com's technical support staff had changed the email address for Baidu.com on the request of an unnamed individual, despite failing security verification procedures. According to the suit, once the address had been changed, the individual was able to use the forgotten password feature to have Baidu's domain passwords sent directly to them, allowing them to accomplish the domain hijacking. The lawsuit was settled out of court under undisclosed terms after Register.com issued an apology.

=== Acquisitions ===
On 16 July 2013, Baidu announced its intention to purchase 91 Wireless from NetDragon. 91 Wireless is best known for its app store, but it has been reported that the app store faces privacy and other legal issues. On 14 August 2013, Baidu announced that its wholly owned subsidiary Baidu (Hong Kong) Limited has signed a definitive merger agreement to acquire 91 Wireless Web-soft Limited from NetDragon Web-soft Inc. for $1.85 billion in what was reported to be the biggest deal ever in China's IT sector.

Also in 2013, Baidu acquired Zongheng to establish Baidu Literature.

=== 2024: Artificial Intelligence Launch ===
On 16 March 2025, Baidu released two new artificial intelligence models: ERNIE 4.5, a foundation model, and ERNIE X1, a reasoning model. Baidu claimed that ERNIE X1 performs comparably to DeepSeek's R1 model at half the price.

== Name ==
The name Baidu (百度) literally means "a hundred times", or alternatively, "countless times". It is a quote from the last line of Xin Qiji's (辛弃疾) classical poem "Green Jade Table in The Lantern Festival" (青玉案·元夕): "Having searched hundreds of times in the crowd, suddenly turning back, she is there in the dimmest candlelight" (众里寻他千百度, 蓦然回首, 那人却在灯火阑珊处).

== Travel ==
Qunar (Qunar Cayman Islands Limited), is a travel-booking service controlled by Baidu. As of 2013, Qunar had 31.4 million active users and raised $167 Million at its initial public offering that year. It is listed at NASDAQ.

== Advertisements ==
Baidu's primary advertising product is called Baidu Tuiguang and is similar to Google Ads and AdSense. It is a pay per click advertising platform that allows advertisers to have their ads shown in Baidu search results pages and on other websites that are part of Baidu Union. Baidu also ranks some search results by advertiser payment, a practice that has drawn criticism; In 2018, with China Daily published commentary calling on Baidu to stop using paid listings, which it said could fill the first two pages of results.

Baidu sells its advertising products via a network of resellers. Baidu's web administrative tools are all in Chinese, making it difficult for non-Chinese speakers to use. In 2012, a third-party company developed a tool with an interface in English for advertising on Baidu. Advertisers on Baidu must have a registered business address either in China or in specified East Asian countries.

== Competition ==
Baidu competes with Sogou, Google Search, 360 Search (www.so.com), Yahoo! China, Microsoft's Bing and MSN Messenger, Sina, NetEase's Youdao and PaiPai, Alibaba's Taobao, TOM Online, DuckDuckGo, and EachNet.

Baidu is the most used search engine in China, controlling 76.05% of China's market share. The number of Internet users in China had reached 705 million by the end of 2015, according to a report by the internetlivestats.com.

In an August 2010 Wall Street Journal article, Baidu played down any benefit from Google's move of its China search service to Hong Kong. Beijing-based research firm Analysys International reported that Baidu's share of China's search-advertising revenue grew from 6% to 70% in the second quarter of 2010.

It is also evident that Baidu is attempting to enter the Internet social network market. As of 2011, it is discussing the possibility of working with Facebook, which would lead to a Chinese version of the international social network, managed by Baidu. This plan, if executed, would face off Baidu with competition from the three popular Chinese social networks Qzone, Renren, and Kaixin001, as well as induce rivalry with instant-messaging giant,Tencent QQ.

On 22 February 2012, Hudong submitted a complaint to the State Administration for Industry and Commerce asking for a review of the behavior of Baidu, accusing it of being monopolistic. By August 2014, Baidu's search market share in China dropped to 56.3%, where Qihoo 360, its closest competitor who rebranded its search engine as so.com, increased its market share to 29.0%, according to a report from CNZZ.com. In February 2015, Baidu was alleged to have used anticompetitive tactics in Brazil against the Brazilian online security firm PSafe and Qihoo 360 (the largest investor of PSafe). In an ongoing competition in AI natural language processing called General Language Understanding Evaluation, otherwise known as GLUE, Baidu took a lead over Microsoft and Google in December 2019.

As of October 2026, Baidu had a 46% market share of the search engine market in China. It's closest competitor was Bing with a 21% market share.

== Research and patents ==
Baidu has started to invest in deep learning research and is integrating new deep learning technology into some of its apps and products, including Phoenix Nest. Phoenix Nest is Baidu's ad-bidding platform.

In April 2012 Baidu JDC long live applied for a patent for its "DNA copyright recognition" technology. This technology automatically scans files that are uploaded by Internet users, and recognizes and filters out content that may violate copyright law.

In April 2022, Baidu announced they gained permits from China to provide the first driverless taxis. The company aim to provide driverless ride-hailing services to the public and have 10 autonomous cars set to begin offering rides to passengers within a 23-square-mile area in suburban begin beginning 28 April 2022.

In July 2022, Baidu unveiled the Apollo RT6, a driverless vehicle that is planned to join Baidu's driverless fleet in 2023.

== Finances ==
The key trends for Baidu are (as of the financial year ending 31 December)

	Revenue (CNY millions)	Revenue by source		Net income (CNY millions)	Total assets (CNY millions)	Total equity (CNY millions)	Employees
	Revenue (CNY millions)	Online marketing (CNY millions)	other sources (CNY millions)	Net income (CNY millions)	Total assets (CNY millions)	Total equity (CNY millions)	Employees
2015	66,382	64,037	2,345	33,664	147,853	80,256	41,467
2016	70,549	64,525	6,024	11,632	181,997	92,274	45,887
2017	84,809	73,146	11,663	18,301	251,728	115,346	39,343
2018	102,277	81,912	20,365	27,573	297,566	162,897	42,267
2019	107,413	78,093	29,320	2,057	301,316	163,599	37,779
2020	107,074	72,840	34,234	22,472	332,708	140,865	41,000
2021	124,493	80,695	43,798	10,226	380,034	156,082	45,500
2022	123,675	74,711	48,964	7,559	390,973	153,168	41,300
2023	134,598	81,203	53,395	20,315	406,759	144,151	39,800
2024	133,125	78,563	54,562	23,760	427,780	144,168	35,900

== Censorship ==
According to the China Digital Times, Baidu has a long history of being the most active and restrictive online censor in the search arena. Documents leaked in April 2009 from an employee in Baidu's internal monitoring and censorship department show a long list of blocked websites and censored topics on Baidu search.

In May 2011, activists sued Baidu in the United States for violating the U.S. Constitution by the censorship it conducts in accord with the demand of the Chinese government. In March 2014, A U.S. federal judge dismissed the suit, ruling that Baidu's exclusion of content from its search results was protected as free speech.

In 2017, Baidu began coordinating with the Chinese Ministry of Public Security as well as 372 Internet police departments to detect information related to "anti-government rumors" and then flooding "Baidu-linked web sites, news sites and devices with alerts dispelling misinformation." This was done using natural language processing, big data and artificial intelligence.

As part of the COVID-19 pandemic, Chinese regulators instructed Baidu, along with other Internet companies, to "conduct special supervision" on news and information related to the disease.

In November 2022, Sustainalytics downgraded Baidu to "non-compliant" with the United Nations Global Compact principles, citing what it described as complicity with censorship.

== Controversies ==
By the late 2010s Baidu's search engine had come under criticism for being a walled garden largely directing users to contents published on platforms under Baidu's control rather than acting as a gateway to the contents of the wider internet, partly as a result of Baidu's own actions, but also as a result of rival internet companies refusing to allow their content to be indexed by Baidu. In a widely shared 2019 blog post entitled "Baidu search engine is dead", communications scholar Fang Kecheng wrote that “Baidu.com is no longer a place for you to search for content on China’s internet, but rather an internal search for Baidu content. .. It won’t lead you to good quality food for the spirit from China’s internet, but content hoarded at home, gone bad.” citing the frequent high placement of results from low quality self-published blogposts on Baijiahao, a blogging platform run by Baidu.

=== U.S. Department of Defense listing ===
In June 2026, the United States Department of Defense added the company to its list of "Chinese military companies."

=== Baidu search advertising and the death of Wei Zexi ===
In 2016, Baidu's P4P search results reportedly contributed to the death of a student who tried an experimental cancer therapy he found online. The 21-year-old college student was named Wèi Zéxī (魏则西), who studied in Xidian University. Wei was diagnosed with synovial sarcoma, a rare form of cancer. He found the Second Hospital of the Beijing Armed Police Corps (武警北京市总队第二医院) through the search engine Baidu, on which the hospital had been promoting itself. The treatment proved unsuccessful and Wèi died in April 2016.

After Wei's family spent around 200,000 yuan (around US$31,150) for treatment in the hospital, Wei Zexi died on 12 April 2016. The incident triggered massive online discussions after Wei's death. On 2 May 2016, Cyberspace Administration of China (CAC), the top watchdog for China's Internet space, dispatched a team of investigators to Baidu. One report claimed medical advertising makes up for 30% of Baidu's ad revenue, much of which comes from for-profit hospitals that belong to the "Putian Network", a collection of hospitals across the country founded by medical entrepreneurs associated with the Putian region of Fujian province. The investigation led Chinese regulators to impose several restrictions on Baidu, including adding disclaimers to promotional content and establishing channels for complaints about Baidu services.

=== Commercialization of Baidu Tieba ===
Baidu Tieba was not profitable to operate for Baidu before 2014, and the company looked for ways to increase revenue from the platform. In 2015-2016, Baidu Tieba came under major controversy for Baidu's practice, which began in 2014, of selling moderator rights to individual forums without the consent of users or the original moderators. In January 2016, it was reported that a forum dedicated to the disease haemophilia was sold by Baidu to a hospital, which removed the original moderation team, and used the forum to post advertising, removing posts complaining about the change. Later that year, Baidu pledged to stop selling the moderation rights to forums. Sixth Tone wrote that selling off the moderation rights for individual forums made relatively little revenue for Baidu and resulted in many boards becoming "advertising spaces for commercial ventures". In 2015, the moderation rights to the Tieba forum dedicated to the video game Minecraft was sold off to a similar mobile clone, "Our World", causing significant controversy. A similar incident occurred the same year when the Tieba forum of the video game Kantai Collection was sold to a company that operated an illegal pirate version of the game in China, again resulting in major controversy.

=== DO Global subsidiary ad-fraud in downloaded apps ===
On 20 April 2019, Buzzfeed News was reported that several applications for Android devices developed by DO Global (formerly DU Group), were surreptitiously running revenue enhancing background programs on user devices since at least 2016. These programs, part of six known applications developed by the company, and downloaded hundreds of millions times, were clicking on internet ads – even when the devices were idle, and unbeknownst to end users, to increase revenue generated by "clicks". Just one of the apps, all of which were available on Google Play Store, had been downloaded 50 million times alone and carried a user rating of 4.5 stars by tens of thousands.

Google banned DO Global and more than 100 of its apps from the Google Play Store on 26 April 2019. DO Global was also banned from Google's AdMob Network. Apps from another developer, ES Global, including the ES File Explorer, that were owned by DO Global were banned from the Play Store and the account was suspended.

=== Block in India ===
In August 2020, following the 2020 China–India skirmishes, the Indian government blocked Baidu and several other Chinese websites, citing national security.

=== 2024 head of communications controversy ===
In May 2024, Qu Jing (Chinese: 璩静), then Baidu's vice president and head of communications, drew widespread criticism on Chinese social media for remarks that CNN Described as an endorsement of "toxic workplace culture." In one Douyin video, she criticized a colleague who had refused to go on a 50-day business trip during the COVID-19 pandemic. The videos prompted wider online discussion of Baidu's corporate governance and internal culture. Qu apologized, and CNN reported that she had lost her job. Baidu’s stock price fell 2.17% in Hong Kong following the incident.

== See also ==
- Panguso
- Tencent
- Sogou
- Alibaba
- Google
- Intellectual property in the People's Republic of China
- Software industry in China
- Comparison of web search engines
- List of search engines
- List of search engines by popularity
- BaiduWiki
