= Moneyweek (Chinese newspaper) =

Defunct Chinese financial newspaper

- Type: Weekly newspaper
- Owner: Southern Media Group
- Founded: 23 July 2007
- Ceased publication: 30 April 2015
- Language: Chinese
- Headquarters: Guangzhou
- Website: www.lczb.net

Moneyweek
- Traditional Chinese: 理財週報
- Simplified Chinese: 理财周报
Transcriptions
Standard Mandarin
- Hanyu Pinyin: Lǐcái zhōubào

The Moneyweek (or Money Week; simplified Chinese: 理财周报; traditional Chinese: 理財週報; pinyin: Lǐcái zhōubào), also known as Money Weekly, was a Chinese financial newspaper established on 23 July 2007 and headquartered in Guangzhou. It was a subsidiary weekly focusing on personal financial news, targeted at readers interested in stock markets, economic investment, and other topics.

Moneyweek was affiliated with the Southern Media Group and was an important member of the 21st Century Newspaper System.

== History ==
Moneyweek was presented by the Southern Media Group on 23 July 2007.

In September 2014, various news collecting and editing staff of the newspaper were taken away for investigation.

On 30 April 2015, the publishing licence of Moneyweek was revoked.
