= Sun Xiaochuan =

Chinese Douyu and Twitch streamer

- 孙笑川
- Born: 12 May 1990 (age 36); Xinjin, Chengdu, Sichuan, China

Bilibili information
- Channel: 孙笑川258
- Years active: 2019–present
- Followers: 2.59 million
- Last updated: 2 March 2026

Sun Xiaochuan (Chinese: 孙笑川, born 1990) is a Chinese Douyu and Twitch streamer. He gained popularity in 2015 for his aggressive and funny interactions with his viewers. On 13 January 2018, after playing a music track with lyrics intentionally edited by his subscribers to imply Falun Gong, which is illegal according to Law of the People's Republic of China, his channel on Douyu has been permanently shut down, further leading himself to be banned from various Chinese video streaming platforms. Sun continued to stream on Twitch, but ceased all streaming-related activities on 9 February 2018.

In 2019, Sun resumed his career by uploading videos on Bilibili, and the number of his subscribers reached 1 million one year after he started.

== Early life and education ==
Sun Xiaochuan was born on 12 May 1990, in Xinjin, Chengdu, Sichuan, China. He lived in a single-parent family with his mother, who worked as a local draper. Sun viewed himself as an introvert and "bad student" in school. After graduating from university, he worked as a safety supervisor in various construction areas, but eventually quit in September 2015, when he claimed that "the work is boring and I have had enough." In the same month, Sun started streaming on Douyu, with the majority of generated contents being about League of Legends.

== Douyu and Twitch Channel ==
=== Timeline ===
==== Gaining popularity (2015–2018) ====
On 1 September 2015, Sun set up his Douyu channel and start working as a video game streamer full-time. He is marked for his aggressive verbal conflicts and humorous interactions with both his in-game teammates and stream viewers while playing League of Legends. Some of his words derived a number of Internet memes, such as "NMSL" (initialism of the profanity "你妈死了", pinyin: nǐ mā sǐ le, lit. "your mother is dead").

==== Being banned from Chinese streaming websites (January 2018) ====
On 13 January 2018, Sun played a song from one of subscribers on his Douyu channel. The lyrics of the song were intentionally changed from the original one, in which the first letter of each line are replaced and can be read as "everybody comes and practice Falun Gong" when aligned together. Sun was unaware of the hidden message, and appreciated the production of the song after playing the whole track. His subscribers then submitted numerous reports on his content for delivering unpermitted "cult" contents against Law of the People's Republic of China, and Douyu permanently shut down his channel after receiving the reports. This event furtherly rendered him being banned from other Chinese video streaming platforms.

==== Circumventing the ban; Reconnecting to the fanbase on Twitch (January 2018) ====
Sun lost his source of income after the incident, which he viewed "disappointing". He soon faced economic hardships, and planned to return to his previous workplace as a safety supervisor, but eventually gave up because the salary did not meet his expectations.

To circumvent the ban and reconnect to his fanbase, Sun began streaming on Twitch, a subsidiary of American company Amazon, which the law of the People's Republic of China does not apply to. He also asked his subscribers for donations by providing an Alipay QR Code embedded in his videos.

==== Stopping activities (February 2018) ====
After Sun streamed on Twitch for a few days, somebody leveraged Alipay's account protection mechanism, intentionally entering wrong passwords to his Alipay account for several times, leading the account to be frozen. The account freeze made Sun lost his access to his property in Alipay, and subsequently unable to perform any purchases and transactions. Sun admitted the incident had an impact on his daily life, making him feel "sad and helpless".

Sun later affirmed on his Weibo account that his attempts on streaming on Twitch was unsuccessful, because he was isolated from the majority of his subscribers and the income was substantially decreased, primarily due to the fact that Twitch is blocked in mainland China.

On 9 February 2018, due to the attempt being unsuccessful, Sun declared that he would cease all streaming-related activities until further notice.

==== Resurgence on Bilibili (2019) ====
On 19 February 2019, Sun uploaded his first video on Bilibili and started to resume his career. The number of subscribers on his channel reached 1 million (as of 20 September 2020) and the total views reached 37 million (as of 7 May 2020). As a reaction, Sun uploaded a video of him unboxing a cake for celebration and appreciation to his subscribers.

== Reception ==
On 27 August 2018, Guangming Daily commented on Sun's activities, stating that Sun did not "manage" his fanbase properly and the memes he created are "a sort of cyberbullying". Sun reacted to the comment immediately, claiming he is always against personal attacks and viewing being legal as a top priority.

The term "NMSL", which was popularized by Sun, became known outside China since the Internet flaming between Thai and Chinese netizens in 2020, and there are also term such as "NMSLese" derived from this slang.
