= Martin Woesler =

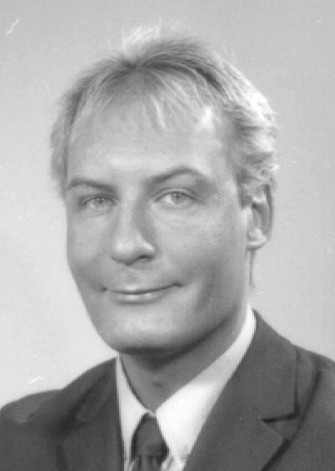
Martin Woesler

Martin Woesler (born 29 September 1969) is a German sinologist, cultural scientist and translator of Chinese literature.

== Sinologist, translator of Chinese literature ==
Woesler translated works from the Chinese authors Lǔ Xùn 魯迅, Zhōu Zuòrén 周作人, Xǔ Dìshān 許地山, Yù Dáfū 郁達夫, Zhū Zìqīng 朱自清, Bīng Xīn 冰心, Bā Jīn 巴金, Qián Zhōngshū 錢鍾書, Wáng Měng 王蒙, Zhāng Jié 張洁, Liú Zàifù 劉再復, Jiǎ Píngwā 賈平凹, and Hán Hán 韓寒 into English and German as well as of Cáo Xuěqín 曹雪芹 into German. Together with Rainer Schwarz he published the first complete translation of the Chinese novel The Dream of the Red Chamber into German. Woesler made available a lot of Chinese literature for the first time in a Western language.

In China, Woesler documented a critical campaign against the liberal Minister of Culture Wáng Měng 王蒙 and proved that this campaign was only superficially motivated by an interest in literature, whereas the actual motivation was political (Political literature in China 1991–1992, 1994). He turned the until then neglected genre of the Chinese essay into a modern tool to express the upcoming individualism in China before the eyes of the European and American China Studies (History of the Chinese essay, 3 vols., 1998). These short first-person narratives, which mostly appeared in newspapers between the May-4th-movement 1919 and the beginning of the 1930s, were a new form for the awaking civil society to express its views and feelings. From the 1930s until around 1979, the essay faced an ideological instrumentalization at the expense of its literary quality. Woesler drew attention to the essayistic work of Zhōu Zuòrén, the younger brother of Lu Xun, who was ostracized due to his positive attitude towards Japan and his independence from daily politics and propaganda. Woesler's re-evaluation of Zhou's work were confirmed by different scholars outside mainland China. In fact, Zhou's writing of intentionally unpolitical literature in a time when literature was instrumenalized, was a political statement by itself. Woeslers work in the tensional field between politics and literature stimulated further books on Zhou, mostly from North American sinologists, supporting the necessity to re-evaluate Zhou.

Since the 1980s, China sees the upcoming of a critical public again. Woesler sees here a parallel between the role of the internet since the 1990s and the newspapers between the 1910s and 1930s. In his books (China's digital dream 2002, and others), together with Chinese scholars, he came to the conclusion, that the internet in China has a more liberalizing impact on society than it has in more liberal countries.

=== Categorization and description of trends of contemporary Chinese literature ===
In preparation of the Frankfurt Book Fair 2009, when China was the guest of honor, Woesler categorized contemporary Chinese literature. He himself translated two very different novels for the Book Fair: The most uncontentious canonized classical novel Dream of the Red Chamber by Cao Xueqin, which has never been fully translated into German before, and one of the most contentious books of China today, Panda Sex by Mian Mian. As the main trend of Chinese literature, Woesler sees young authors describing their everyday life in a rapidly and excitingly changing reality. The main motivation force of this literature is the alienation, initiated by urbanization and loss of orientation. Young Chinese do not live in and for the traditional family clan anymore, but are on their own. This has added a more critical and independent view to Chinese literature. The stories are dealing with drugs abuse, alienation, singles and the world of dreams. This touches also Western readers of translations.

After the liberal 1980s, the 1990s saw a strong commercialization of literature due to an opening of the book market. Woesler sees the following trends: 'cult literature' such as Guo Jingming's Cry Me a River 悲伤逆流成河; vagabond literature such as Xu Zechen's Running Through Beijing 跑步穿过中关村 and Liu Zhenyun's The Pickpockets 我叫刘跃; underground literature such as Mian Mian's Panda Sex 声名狼籍; 'longing for something' literature, divided in historicizing literature such as Yu Dan's Confucius in Your Heart 《論語》心得 and Yi Zhongtian's Chinese History 易中天中華史; Tibetan literature with Alai; literature of the mega cities; women's literature with Bi Shumin; and master narratives by narrators like Mo Yan's Life and Death Are Wearing Me Out.

However Chinese literature at the beginning of the 21st century shows signs of overcoming the commercialization of literature of the 1980s and 1990s. An example is Han Han's novel His Land 他的国, which was written in a social critical surrealistic style against the uncritical mainstream, but ranked 1st in 2009 Chinese bestseller list. The online literature plays a more important role.

=== Translations from Chinese into English ===
- The Chinese Essay in the 20th Century, The University Press Bochum, 2000, 496 (xlii, 205, 229) pp., ISBN 978-3-934453-14-2, incl. 42 essays, both in Chinese and English, and an introduction to the genre. It contains texts from Lu Xun, Zhou Zuoren, Xu Dishan, Yu Dafu, Zu Ziqing, Bing Xin, Ba Jin, Qian Zhongshu, Yang Shuo, Sun Li, Wang Zengqi, Yu Guangzhong, Wang Meng, Zhang Jie, Liu Zaifu, Xue Erkang, Ye Meng, Jia Pingwa, and Si Yu.

=== Works on Chinese literature ===
==== in English ====
- Martin Woesler, ed., The Modern Chinese Literary Essay - Defining the Chinese Self in the 20th Century - Conference Proceedings, Bochum, The University Press Bochum, 2000, 327 pp., ISBN 978-3-934453-15-9
- Harvard lecture on the 20th century Chinese essay, Bochum 3rd ed. 2006, book series Scripta Sinica vol. 4
- Yale lecture on the 20th century Chinese essay, Bochum 2nd ed. 2005, ISBN 978-3-89966-102-6, 58 pp., book series Scripta Sinica vol. 3
- Comparing Chinese and German culture, Bochum 2006, book series Comparative Cultural Sciences vol. 2

==== in German ====
- Chinese cultic literature 2008/2009 - authors, works, trends, Munich 2009, 127 pp., book series Sinica vol. 25
- Chinese contemporary literature - authors, works, trends – A snap-shot 2007/2008, Munich 2008, 267 pp., book series Sinica vol. 23
- Timeless Chinese poetry from the beginnings to the “China avant-garde”, Bochum 4th ed. 2007, 72 pp., book series Scripta Sinica vol. 8
- The history of the Chinese essay, Bochum, 2nd ed. 2009, xiii, 900 pp.
- My Essays are my ‘Longing for Freedom’ - Wang Meng, Former Minister of Culture, as Essayist in the Period 1948-1992, ix, 394 pp, Frankfurt / Main, Peter Lang Press 1998
- Political Literature in China 1991-92 - Wang Meng's 'Reform of Breakfast Habits'. A Translation of the Story “Hard Porridge” and the Documentation of an Absurd Debate, Bochum 2nd ed. 2003, 252 pp., book series Sinica vol. 13
- Valuation criteria for literature – The Dream of the Red Chamber as the most important Chinese novel, Bochum 3rd ed. 2006, 66 pp., book series Scripta Sinica vol. 7

=== Works on the Chinese internet ===
- Zhang Junhua, Martin Woesler, eds., China’s digital dream. The impact of the Internet on Chinese society, The University Press Bochum 2002.10, 274 pp., ISBN 978-3-934453-90-6

=== Literature ===
- Wolf Baus, News on Chinese literature, in: East Asian Literature Bulletin (1994.11, issue 17), pp. 109 – 114
- Wolfgang Kubin, Introduction: Prose, Essays, in: History of Chinese Literature, vol. 4, Bonn 2.2004, p. 3
- European Science & Scholarship Association: Statement of the jury awarding Martin Woesler the prize 'Desideratum 2007'

== Comparative cultural scientist ==
In the field of cultural comparison Woesler has advanced the existing models by contributing descriptive, high-contrast examples of distant cultures, like the Anglo-American and the Chinese. Here he has enriched the theory of cultureshocks with the term own culture shock, which describes the state of shock a person crossing cultures can suffer from when he returns to his own culture. Woesler has set different traditional models of comparison of cultures in the framework of a related system and further developed them in front of the background of globalization, mobility, and the internet. In 2006, he developed the model of culture maps, in which all cultural phenomena are positioned in a coordinate system and related with phenomena of other cultures. Applying the model, even mixed cultures can be described better than with traditional models.

=== Works on comparative cultural science ===
- A new model of intercultural communication – critically reviewing, combining and further developing the basic models of Permutter, Yoshikawa, Hall, Hofstede, Thomas, Hallpike, and the social-constructivism, Bochum/Berlin 2009, book series Comparative Cultural Sciences vol. 1 [Introducing a model to compare distant cultures like the Chinese and the Anglo-American one.]
- co-ed. of the book series 'Comparative Cultural Science' with Matthias Kettner

=== Sources ===
Interviews with Martin Woesler

- Philipp Stelzner, "What do Chinese people read? About fast moving party literature and long novels" in: television channels N24/Pro7/Sat1, broadcast date 2009/10/15
- Lisa Grant, Frankfurt/Washington D.C., American National Radio "Meeting of official and dissident authors at the Frankfurt Book Fair", background interview 2009/10/14
- Angela Gutzeit, Deutschlandfunk Cologne, Rich Chinese Literature at the Frankfurt Book Fair, 2009/10/13 4.10-4.30 pm
- Henrik Schmitz, China for a long time was leading world literature, evangelisch.de, Frankfurt 2009/10/01
- Nicole Stöcker, The Chinese culture has not yet shaken off its status of exotism, in: Buchreport, pp 54–55, Dortmund 2009/09/01, issue 9
- Jennifer Minke, The hour of the young authors, weekly magazine "Börsenblatt", Frankfurt 2008/5
