= Global Entrepreneur =

Chinese business magazine

Global Entrepreneur Magazine
- First issue: July 1993
- Final issue: April 28, 2015
- Website: gemag.com.cn/GE/
- ISSN: 1004-8545

Global Entrepreneur (Chinese: 环球企业家), also known as GE Global Entrepreneur Magazine or Global Entrepreneur Magazine, was a large-scale Chinese commercial magazine sponsored by the Chinese Writers Association and the China Literature Foundation (中华文学基金会). In 2015, the magazine ceased publication. On 18 September 2020, it was deregistered by the National Press and Publication Administration of China.

The consultants of Global Entrepreneur included Yu Guangyuan, Li Yining, Wu Jinglian and others.

== History ==
Global Entrepreneur was launched in July 1993 in Beijing, with a branch office in Shanghai. In 2009, it was transferred to the "21st Century Newspaper Series" (21世纪报系).

On 28 April 2015, Global Entrepreneur officially ceased publication.
