= Baidu Tieba =

Chinese communication platform

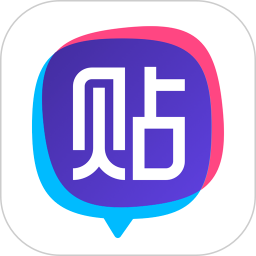

- Baidu Tieba website in 2023 (Chinese version)
- Website type: Bulletin Board Service
- Available in: Chinese, Vietnamese, Japanese
- Headquarters: Beijing, Haidian 10, Shangdi Street, Baidu Building, China
- Owner: Baidu
- Creator: Robin Li
- Website: tieba.baidu.com wapp.baidu.com（mobile version）
- Commercial: Yes
- Registration: Compulsory
- Launched: December 1, 2003; 22 years ago

Baidu Tieba (Chinese: 百度贴吧; pinyin: bǎidù tiēbā; lit. 'Baidu Post Bar') is a Chinese online forum hosted by the Chinese web services company Baidu. Baidu Tieba was established on December 3, 2003 as an online community that heavily integrates Baidu's search engine. Users may search for a topic of interest forum known as a "bar" which will then be created if it does not exist already. It has been described as similar to Reddit, with the bars comparable to subreddits. The forum had over 300 million monthly active users during its peak in the 2010s, but the number of active users had declined by nearly 90% from its peak by the early 2020s. The number of its total registered user accounts exceeds 1.5 billion. As of June 6, 2021, Baidu Tieba has 23,254,173 communities.

== Introduction ==
Baidu Tieba uses forums called bars (which are analogous to Reddit subreddits) for users to socially interact. The slogan of Baidu Tieba is "Born for your interest" (Chinese: 为兴趣而生). These bars covered a variety of topics, such as celebrities, sports, science, films, comics, and books. More than one billion posts have been published in these bars. Some Baidu Tieba bars are large enough that they are comparable in influence to independent forums, while others are much smaller, perhaps only having a few users, and more resemble a personal blog.

In many cases the topic of discussion on Baidu Tieba forums has little to do with the title of the bar.

According to Alexa Internet in 2007, traffic to Baidu Tieba then made up more than 10% of the total traffic to Baidu properties.

== Functions ==
Every bar can have up to three masters, thirty vice-masters, and ten video-masters to manage uploaded videos. Users can post, at most, ten pictures and one video quoted from certain broadcast websites. Users cannot edit any published posts. However, users can delete their own published posts and comments from other users on their posts. Beyond regular text posts, Baidu Tieba allows for the use of polls. Every bar has its own 2GB space for members to upload videos. If a bar is ranked within the top 500 of the official rankings, it has its own album.

Like Reddit, Baidu Tieba forms are moderated by unpaid volunteers, who are allowed to set the rules of the bar, remove comments and posts considered disruptive, among other functions. Moderators can be removed by Baidu staff at will for reasons such as lack of activity, failure to grow the forum, or for exploiting their moderator position for commercial gain.

Prior to 2010, Baidu Tieba allowed anonymous posting, displaying only the IP address of the poster. Since then, users are required to have a registered account in order to post on bars. It is illegal in China to publish rumors which "threaten the social order", a crime punishable by up to 7 years jail. The onus is on service providers to police and remove such content. Baidu Tieba is no exception and warns users against the dangers of spreading false information, suggesting it is done for notoriety as well as commercial and political gain.

Baidu Tieba also has a consumer-to-consumer e-commerce sale function, which had led it to be likened to Craigslist.

By 2021 Tieba had launched a feature allowing approved users to upload short-form video content.

== History ==
Baidu Tieba was released to the public around December 1, 2003.

At its peak Baidu Tieba hosted numerous passionate fan communities dedicated to various topics, such as anime series. During the summer of 2005, the popularity of Baidu Tieba was buoyed by discussion surrounding the second season of the popular singing competition Super Girl, with Baidu Tieba members organizing activity on Tieba to attract votes for their favourite contestants. A prominent feature of Baidu Tieba's culture is "forum bombing", where members of a bar/subform spam other Tieba bars with meaningless or empty to posts to disrupt them. Conflict between different Baidu Tieba communities/bars supporting rival Super Girl contestants resulted in efforts to spam/disrupt rival contestants bars over the next several years.

One of the notable and popular forums/bars on Baidu Tieba is the Li Yi Bar, originally created to mock Chinese footballer Li Yi in 2004 though it eventually broadened its topic scope. It had gained over 6 million users by 2017, and became for known for its distinctive culture and slang, as well as its campaigns to flood/spam rival Tieba bars and social media pages of people and organizations considered to oppose the Chinese government.

Tieba became notable on the Chinese internet for its numerous controversies. In 2008 users and moderators of the Tieba bar dedicated to the video game Audition Online was accused of mocking the victims of the 2008 Sichuan earthquake, resulting in the forum being temporarily locked by Baidu. That same year, the Tieba bar dedicated to the South Korean boyband TVXQ was bombed after rumors that one of their members had assaulted someone, resulting in the forum having to be made approved members-only for posting.

In 2009, the viral Chinese internet meme "Jia Junpeng" spawned from a post on the World of Warcraft bar on Baidu Tieba.

In the summer of 2010, Tieba was the subject of a major controversy known as the "69 Holy War" ("69圣战"), originally instigated by the Korean boyband Super Junior allegedly giving far fewer free tickets than was reputedly promised to a concert in Shanghai in May of that year, in what rumors alleged was an attempt to inflate the popularity of the band, resulting in significant disorder including violence at the concert. This was followed by online attacks against the Super Junior Tieba bar and other internet users interested in Japanese or Korean culture orchestrated by a number of Tieba forums. In response Baidu banned and demoted the moderators of forums orchestrating the "holy war."

In 2012, Baidu Tieba updated its interface, switching from a simple reply-by-sequence user interface, into a more complicated reply-in-same-floor one. Along with the new interface, new functionalities such as rankings, more expressive pictures, and allowing administrators to change the background images of Tieba, were also implemented. Also that year, several Baidu employees were arrested for allegedly being bribed to delete certain Tieba forum posts in exchange for payment.

By 2015, Baidu Tieba had over 1 billion registered accounts and over 300 million active users.

Despite the popularity of Baidu Tieba, for a long time up until 2014 Baidu Tieba was not profitable to operate for Baidu, resulting in Baidu searching for ways to increase revenue from the platform. In 2015-2016, Baidu Tieba came under major controversy for Baidu's practice, which began in 2014, of selling moderator rights to individual forums without the consent of users or the original moderators. In January 2016, it was reported that a forum dedicated to the disease haemophilia was sold by Baidu to a hospital, which removed the original moderation team, and used the forum to post advertising, removing posts complaining about the change. Later that year, Baidu pledged to stop selling the moderation rights to forums. Sixth Tone wrote that selling off the moderation rights for bars made relatively little revenue for Baidu and resulted in many boards becoming "advertising spaces for commercial ventures". In 2015, the moderation rights to the Tieba bar dedicated to the video game Minecraft was sold off to a similar mobile clone, "Our World", causing significant controversy. A similar incident occurred the same year when the Tieba forum of the video game Kantai Collection was sold to a company that operated an illegal pirate version of the game in China, again resulting in major controversy.

In 2016, there were complaints about copyright infringement on Tieba as a result of users posting paid chapters of novels on Tieba without permission. In response, Baidu temporarily closed many forums dedicated to novels and similar topics to "comprehensively overhaul and investigate" any pirated content, even though this stopped legitimate discussion surrounding the works.

In 2017, Baidu Tieba was investigated by the Beijing Municipal Cyberspace Administration because users were allegedly using it to "spread terror-related material, rumours and obscenities". It has previously been summoned by the Ministry of Public Security for concerns including "inadequate security management and prominent issues such as illegal information involving firearms and explosives, the sale of citizens' personal information, and pornography". In 2018, a man used Baidu Tieba to solicit a hitman for an unsuccessful plot to murder his wife. A 2025 Vice News article stated that Baidu Tieba "was often used for criminality", while a 2021 journal article stated that Tieba was known as a place where "victims can share their experiences of being victimized and warn other potential victims".

Baidu Tieba began to decline in traffic beginning in 2012. By 2019, its traffic had declined substantially relative to its heyday, having only tens of million rathers than hundreds of million of active users, with other platforms like Weibo, WeChat, Douyin, Bilibili, Xiaohongshu and Zhihu having gained prominence (with Weibo having taken the celebrity interested audience, while Zhihu had siphoned the audience interested in Tieba as a knowledge platform). By this time, the homepage of the website was "dominated by advertisements and live streams". On May 13, 2019, topics posted in Baidu Tieba before January 1, 2017 were hidden. A Baidu official said that the topics are hidden temporarily due to "system maintenance". By 2021, it had lost nearly 90% of its userbase compared to 2015, down to only 37.43 million monthly active users. This decline has been attributed to several factors, including competition from rival platforms, heavy-handed moderation by Baidu administrators, excessive demands of volunteer moderators, excessive commercialisation which undermined user faith in the platform, as well as failure to effectively integrate video content.

In 2023, the Tieba bar dedicated to controversial livestreamer Sun Xiaochuan was subject to a "special cleanup campaign" by Baidu following allegations of misogynistic comments made by some of its users.

In 2026, Baidu was sued by miHoYo, apparently over alleged leaked information regarding the game Genshin Impact posted on a Tieba forum. That year, dozens of Tieba forums and accounts were banned because of their involvement in exposing the personal information, outing and harassing LBGT members of other Tieba forums.

== International development ==
Baidu Postbar is the international version of Baidu Tieba.

In order to expand its commercial domain, Baidu Postbar has been introduced to several countries listed below:

- Baidu Tieba Brazil
- Baidu Tieba Thailand
- Baidu Tieba Vietnam
- Baidu Tieba Japan

In late 2011, the Japanese version of Baidu Postbar was shut down.

Since May 2015, all logins are disabled on the Vietnamese version of Baidu Postbar.
