= Death of Wei Zexi =

Chinese student part of the experimental treatment DC-CIK

Wei Zexi (Chinese: 魏则西; pinyin: Wèi Zéxī; 1994–2016) was a 21-year old Chinese college student from Shaanxi who died after receiving DC-CIK, an experimental treatment for synovial sarcoma at the Second Hospital of the Beijing Armed Police Corps; he had learned of it from a promoted result on the Chinese search engine Baidu.

Wei's death led to an investigation by the Cyberspace Administration of China, prompting Chinese regulators to impose new restrictions on Baidu advertisements. State media outlets broadly condemned the role of the hospital and Baidu in his death, while users online additionally denounced Baidu's advertising practices. Baidu shares fell almost 14 percent in the days following reports of Wei's death.

== Treatment and death ==
In 2014, Wei was diagnosed with synovial sarcoma, a rare form of cancer that affects tissue around major joints. After he received radiation and chemotherapy, his family sought out other treatments.

Through a promoted result on the Chinese search engine Baidu, Wei discovered the Second Hospital of the Beijing Armed Police Corps, a state and military-run hospital which provided an immunotherapy treatment called DC-CIK for those with synovial sarcoma. State radio operations claimed Wei's family trusted the treatment because it had been "promoted by one of the military hospitals which are considered credible, and the attending doctor had appeared on many mainstream media platforms".

Wei went through four treatments at the hospital, spending upwards of 200,000 yuan ($31,008 USD) with his family, but the treatments proved unsuccessful, causing Wei to die on April 12, 2016. Before his death, Wei accused Baidu of promoting false medical information; he also denounced the hospital for claiming high success rates for the treatment.

== Aftermath ==
=== Public response ===
Following Wei's death, several Internet users expressed disdain for Baidu's advertising practices. Wei posted an essay responding to the question "What do you think is the greatest evil of human nature?" on the Chinese question-and-answer website Zhihu which described his experience receiving treatment. The essay, which condemned Baidu's advertising practices, received 44,000 agrees and thousands of comments.

Baidu shares fell nearly 14 percent following reports of Wei's death in early May 2016. Chinese state media outlet Xinhua and the People's Daily condemned Baidu for Wei's death, the former stating that "making money by allowing companies to pay for better search placement is to put a good tool in the hands of interest-seekers with bad intentions".

One later editorial in the People's Daily called Wei's death a "classic" example of the unrealistic "Chinese-style" search for an impossible cure. Around 250,000 people commented on the piece; several denounced the piece for casting the incident as a failure of the family rather than one of Baidu and the hospital.

Wei's death also brought attention towards medical entrepreneurs connected with the so-called "Putian system" a group of hospitals named after their origin, Putian in Fujian Province, which controlled around 80% of private hospitals in China in the 2010s, and had a reputation for poor quality care. Putian hospitals relied extensively on online advertisements, and Chinese media outlets criticized these promotions' accuracy. Some Chinese media outlets suggested the Putian system was linked with the hospital, but a nurse working at the hospital told the Xi'an newspaper Huashang Bao the hospital was self-managed.

=== Investigations ===
On May 2, 2016, the Cyberspace Administration of China announced it would investigate Baidu's role in Wei's death, noting his death "drew widespread attention from Internet users". A Baidu spokeswoman said the company would cooperate with investigations, asserting that Baidu "will give no quarter to fake information or illegal activities online". Some Internet users critical of Baidu began referring to it as "Bǎidú" ("百毒"), or "100 poisons."

Unlike other search engines such as Google and Yahoo!, promoted search results on Baidu are not clearly distinguished from other content. The investigation concluded that Baidu's pay-for-placement results influenced the fairness and objectivity of search results and therefore influenced Wei's medical choices. Regulators ordered Baidu to attach "eye-catching markers" and disclaimers to advertisements, reduce the amount of promoted results to 30% of the page, and establish better channels for users to complain about their services.

Baidu released a statement accepting the results of the investigation and announced it would implement the recommendations promptly. Baidu also planned to create a one billion yuan ($155,038,760 USD) fund to compensate users who suffered demonstrable economic harm from paid results.

A separate investigation also found the hospital where Wei received treatment had been illegally working with private healthcare businesses.
