= Bachelor of Management =

Undergraduate Degree in Management Studies

A Bachelor of Management (BMgt or BMgmt) is an undergraduate degree program offered by numerous universities worldwide. This program equips students with the knowledge and skills necessary to assume managerial roles in a variety of organizations. It provides a solid foundation in organizational behavior and human resource management, while also allowing students to specialize in specific areas of interest through elective courses such as labor-management relations, negotiation, leadership, conflict resolution, compensation systems, and organizational development. Additionally, this degree program provides insights into how organizations function, how they are managed, and their interactions in both national and international environments.

== BMS program structure ==
=== Core and major curriculum ===
This programme enables students to develop advanced knowledge and skills in a range of business functions while setting them within the wider context of current business practice. In the first and second years, students have a variety of choices with an understanding of the role of the core business disciplines:

- Accounting
- Introduction to finance
- Operations and Information management
- Human resource management
- Introduction to marketing
- Micro Economics
- Organizational Behaviour
- Business Law

In third year, students will study Organizational Strategy and they will have a choice of subjects from a list of options, based on their own interests and career aspirations. These options offer excellent opportunities to gain relevant work experience to prepare for their careers or add an international dimension to their undergraduate study.

=== Main course descriptions ===
- Introduction To Management

This course gives a brief introduction to the critical management skills involved in planning, structuring, controlling, and leading an organization. It provides a framework to help students understand managing and being managed. Thus, leading them to become a more effective contributor to the organizations that they join. Students can develop a system view of organizations through examining organizations as part of a context. It aims to train the learners to diagnose and suggest the suitable solutions to various managerial and organizational cases.

- Human Resource Management

The focus of this course is to explore the principles of leading and managing people efficiently in today's global enterprises. In this field, students access HR policy and practice in the areas of employment law, job analysis, employee relations and international HRM.

- Organizational Behavior

This organizational behaviour course combines classic arguments and contemporary empirical debates by discussing different elements of organizational structure. It introduces theoretical and empirical research on individual, interpersonal and group effectiveness at work. Course topics can be extended from decision making, motivation, leadership, teamwork to organizational culture. The learning method highly focuses on applying the essential tools of human side of management in role-play exercises and group projects in global organizations.

- Economics for Management

The objective of the course is to show students how economic theory is related to the applications in managerial decision making and how resources are allocated and coordinated to achieve the organizations' end goal. It emphasizes microeconomics ideas to solve problems and define the main concepts and models used in economic analysis. "Course topics covered include consumer theory, production, applications to the labour market, market structure, monopoly, oligopoly, product differentiation, pricing, decision analysis, bargaining, auctions, and asymmetric information."

- Law and Policy

The primary aim of the course is to make students aware of the basic legal concepts and implications affecting business transactions. It fosters a deeper practical sense of how to critically manage the important relationship between business and the natural environment

- Organizational Strategy

The first half of the course studies strategic situations and learn how to utilize the analytical tools to evaluate a firm's position in the industry. Due to the modeling foundation of game theory, students will be tackled the real-world challenges and build the appropriate action plans. The second half of the course explores the evidence of different managerial styles and the impact on firm process, organizational change and corporate culture that constitute today's collaborative business environments.

=== Optional courses ===
The management courses have a common first year, providing students with a solid foundation, before allowing them to specialize and enhance their career prospects. The program also includes a dissertation and optional modules, offering students significant flexibility to concentrate on areas of special interest. Students have the opportunity to choose elective modules from a selection list, which may include:

- Strategic management
- Managerial Economics
- Bank Strategy and Management
- Entrepreneurship
- Introduction to International Business
- Leadership
- Advanced Financial Accounting

== Placements and internships ==
Many universities offer management studies degree programs of either three or four years, with options to undertake an 11-month work placement or a period of study abroad. Such programs typically provide opportunities for students to gain practical work experience and develop business competencies through engagement with real-world organisational challenges, including the production of research reports. Work placements at established organisations allow students to develop skills in adapting to dynamic business environments. The program may also inform students' decisions regarding career paths, including entry into the job market.

For internships, students in a Bachelor of Management Studies program can pursue various roles in different fields. Here are some examples:

- Marketing: Assistant Brand Manager; Technical Marketing Assistant; Media Planner & Buyer
- Supply Chain Management: E-commerce Analyst
- Banking, Finance and Accountancy: Global Investment Manager; Mergers & Acquisitions Analyst; Audit or Tax Trainee; Treasury Assistant
- Human Resources: Management Consultant, Payroll Analyst, Talent Acquisition; Training Coordinator
- IT: Systems Analyst; Project Analyst

== Career options after BMS ==
=== Employability skills ===
Demonstrating employability skills is crucial for students to differentiate themselves in today's competitive job market. Graduates from BMS programs acquire a valuable portfolio of transferable skills sought by employers across various sectors. These skills include general competencies such as organization and effective communication, as well as specific aptitudes related to studying management, including:

- Business acumen: The BMS program provides students with insights into business practices, financial transactions, and commercial ventures. This is highly valuable as commercial awareness is one of the skills commonly sought by graduate recruiters.
- Problem solving: Most employers seek candidates who possess strong problem-solving abilities. BMS courses equip students with specific problem-solving approaches and foster the development of critical thinking skills.
- Proficiency statistics and quantitative methods: Knowledge of statistics, quantitative methods, and relevant software packages is particularly advantageous for certain graduate roles, such as market research, banking, and consultancy.
- Global mindset: The ability to think globally and comprehend the bigger picture in a holistic manner is valuable for strategic positions within diverse organizations.

=== Career direction ===
"In 2009, 65% of graduates from BMS went into full-time employment approximately. 22% work in the commercial, industrial and public management sectors. Others found work as health professionals (14.8%), in retail (14.4%) and marketing (12.5%). " The Bachelor of Management Studies degree is highly applicable to a wide range of professions, especially within business-related sectors. This course will provide a gateway for a career in:

- General business management
- Finance
- Financial Consulting
- Business Analysis
- Strategic Management and Planning

== See also ==
- Bachelor of Business Administration
- Bachelor of Business Management
- Bachelor of Accountancy
- Bachelor of Economics
- Bachelor of Commerce
