= Euphemisms for internet censorship in China =

Slang terms referring to China's extensive online censorship

River crab (Chinese: 河蟹; pinyin: héxiè) and harmonious/harmonize/harmonization (Chinese: 和谐; pinyin: héxié) are internet slang terms created by Chinese netizens in reference to the internet censorship, or other kinds of censorship in mainland China. In Mandarin Chinese, the word "river crab" (河蟹), which originally meant Chinese mitten crab, sounds similar to "harmonious/harmonize/harmonization" (Chinese: 和谐). This is derived from "harmonious society", (和谐社会) ex-Chinese leader Hu Jintao's signature ideology.

== Terms ==
The 2004 Chinese Communist Party announcement of the goal of constructing a "harmonious society" has been cited by the government of China as the reason for internet censorship. As a result, Chinese netizens began to use the word "harmonious/harmonize/harmonization" (和谐) as a euphemism for censorship when the word for censorship itself was censored, particularly on BBSs. Following this, the word "harmonious" itself was censored, at which point Chinese netizens began to use the word for "river crab", a near homophone for "harmonious". In a further complication of meaning, sometimes aquatic product (Chinese: 水产) is used in place of "river crab".

These euphemisms are also used as verbs. For example, instead of saying something has been censored, one might say "it has been harmonized" (Chinese: 被和谐了) or "it has been river-crabbed" (Chinese: 被河蟹了). The widespread use of "river crab" by Chinese netizens represents a sarcastic defiance against official discourse and censorship. Some observers, however, have warned that the practice may also reproduce domination, since it does not aim for the abolition of censorship. The sensitive words will remain silent as such, and as a result the everyday reappropriation of official language creates the conditions for the latter's perpetuation.

	Simplified Chinese	Traditional Chinese	Pinyin	English translation	Passive voice (Note: Mandarin Chinese-speakers add a "被" (bèi) before a verb to construct a passive voice. See: Voice (grammar)#Voices in topic-prominent languages.)	Note
Origin	和谐社会	和諧社會	héxié shèhuì	harmonious society	—N/a	
Internet slang	和谐	和諧	héxié	harmonious / harmonize / harmonization	被和谐 (be harmonized)	Used as a euphemism alluding to censorship in China
Internet slang	河蟹	河蟹	héxiè	river crab	被河蟹 (be river-crabbed)	Near-homophone of "和谐" (héxié, harmonious)
Internet slang	水产	水產	shuǐchǎn	aquatic product	被水产 (be aquatic-produced)	allusion and a replacement of "河蟹" (river crab)

External image
- River crab society, three wearing watches (河蟹社会，三个戴表)

A well-known picture usually named River crab society, three wearing watches (河蟹社会，三个戴表) illustrates the slang "river crab". In the picture, the three wristwatches refer to the Three Represents, where the Mandarin expressions used for "represent" (Chinese: 代表; pinyin: dàibiǎo) and "Wearing watch(es)" (simplified Chinese: 戴表; traditional Chinese: 戴錶; pinyin: dài biǎo) are homophones. The satirized homophone of the three watches might be created by Chinese writer Wang Xiaofeng (王小峰), whose online nickname is "Wearing three watches" (戴三个表). An offensive term "foolish bitch" (Chinese: 呆婊; pinyin: dāi biǎo) is also used by anti-Communist Chinese people.

	Simplified Chinese	Traditional Chinese	Pinyin	English translation	Note
Origin	三个代表	三個代表	sān ge dàibiǎo	Three Represents	
Internet slang	戴表	戴錶	dài biǎo	wearing watch(es)	Homophone of "代表" (dàibiǎo, represent)
Internet slang	呆婊	呆婊	dāi biǎo	foolish prostitute	Near-homophone of "代表" (dàibiǎo, represent); Very offensive

== See also ==
- Chinese internet slang
- Internet censorship in China
- Hexie Farm
- List of internet phenomena in China
- Golden Shield Project
- Baidu 10 Mythical Creatures
- Grass Mud Horse
- Very erotic very violent
