= List of internet phenomena in China =

This is a list of phenomena specific to the internet within China.

== Memes ==
- Aircraft carrier style (航母style; hángmǔ style) – refers to the crouching and pointing position taken by two technicians on the Chinese aircraft carrier Liaoning to give the green light to the fighter pilots. Has spawned many parody images posted by web users. The name of the meme itself is a parody of "Gangnam Style".
- Back Dorm Boys – two Chinese males lip-synching to Backstreet Boys in a dormitory.
- The Bus Uncle – the reaction of an angry middle aged man towards a young man seated behind him on a bus in Hong Kong, which became widespread over the internet.
- Honglaowai – an American, named George Costow, who sang Chinese communist songs which he put on YouTube.
- "I and my little friends were struck dumb!" (我和我的小伙伴都惊呆了; wǒ hé wǒ de xiǎo huǒbàn dōu jīng dāile) – a meme used for surprise and bewilderment. Originated in 2013 in a primary school student's essay.
- "I would rather cry in a BMW" – an old, long-familiar phrase made famous by Ma Nuo, a 21-year-old contestant on the game show If You Are the One, when asked by a suitor whether or not she would go ride on his bicycle with him on a date. The phrase became a meme and caused an outcry on the internet and led to serious soul-searching about materialism in early 21st-century Chinese society.
- Jia Junpeng – a post on the Baidu Tieba World of Warcraft forum which attracted more than 400,000 viewers and 17,000 replies, despite only consisting of the text "Jia Junpeng, your mother is calling you home for dinner".
- "Just out getting some soy sauce" (打酱油; dǎjiàngyóu) – in 2008, Edison Chen, a celebrity from Hong Kong, was involved in a nude photo scandal which shocked many around the world. A Guangzhou journalist attempted to interview an ordinary man on the street about the incident. The man said that he knew nothing about it, and was "just out getting some soy sauce." After that, this became a very popular internet meme, used to indicate that some people do not care about what goes on in society, or that bigger issues do not concern them because they are powerless to affect the outcome anyway.
- "Make 100 million first" (先挣它一个亿; xiān zhēng tā yīgè yì) – during a 2016 interview, talk show host Chen Luyu asked Wanda Group chairman and Asia's richest man Wang Jianlin what his advice was for young people whose goal was to "become the richest person," Wang responded, "first, set a small goal. For instance, let's make one hundred million first." That Wang referred to an astronomical sum of money as a "small goal" was derided on social media, with many spoofs appearing parodying the phrase.
- Sister Feng – gained significant attention in late 2009, after passing out flyers in Shanghai seeking a marriageable boyfriend with extreme demands.
- "My dad is Li Gang!" (我爸是李刚; wǒ bà shì Lǐ Gāng) – a popular internet catchphrase in 2010, following the Li Gang incident.
- Very erotic very violent – a common internet catchphrase, after a report by Xinwen Lianbo, the most viewed of China's state-sponsored news programs, where a young girl was reported to have come across content on the internet which was "Very erotic, very violent". This incident sparked wide forms of parody on the internet, and also questioned the credibility of the state broadcaster's newscasts.
- Very good very mighty – a common catchphrase found throughout Chinese forums, and has many different variants.
- Duang – sound used by Jackie Chan to express astonishment/surprise in a notorious Bawang Shampoo commercial. This sound was parodied by Bilibili user "绯色toy" then quickly went viral and became a meme among Chinese netizens.
- "Prehistoric powers" (洪荒之力; hóng huāng zhī lì) – during an interview after her 100 m backstroke semi-final at the 2016 Summer Olympics, Chinese swimmer Fu Yuanhui expressed her surprise after being told she had just recorded a personal best and set a national record, responding to the news by saying that she must have used her "prehistoric powers". Her series of facial expressions spread widely on the internet and this phrase quickly became a popular catchphrase.
- "Smells good" (真香; zhēn xiāng) – from the reality show X-Change (变形计; biàn xíng jì) Season 8, Episode 3 by Hunan Television, an extremely spoiled teenager called Wang Jingze (王境泽; wáng jìng zé) was forced to live in rural area for a period of time. He threw a fit and attempted to escape because he could not stand the "bad quality" food and water in the countryside. He protested that he would rather die from starving or commit suicide than eat anything from there. However, he finally eat the fried rice cooked by his companion and praised "smells good". Eventually, the netizens used that word to tease the infirmity or change of attitude of somebody.
- "No zuo no die" (If you don't do, then you will not die) – The original wording is Chinglish.
- "Bro Jie, No!" – a Taiwanese sex educational film which was made in 2012.

== Politically motivated memes ==
- Baidu 10 Mythical Creatures – a popular meme regarding a series of mythical creatures, with names which referred to various Chinese profanities. It is seen by some observers as a form of protest against increased internet censorship in China introduced in early 2009.
- Green Dam Girl (绿坝娘; lǜbàniáng) – Chinese netizens' reaction to the release and distribution of Green Dam Youth Escort, a form of content control software. The Green Dam Girl is a manga-style moe anthropomorphism representation of the software, where common themes involve censorship, satire and sexuality.
- "Too simple, sometimes naive" – an English-language phrase used by then Chinese Communist Party general secretary Jiang Zemin in October 2000 during a question-and-answer period with reporters while meeting then Hong Kong chief executive Tung Chee-hwa. Widely regarded to be in poor taste, Jiang was using the phrase to scold reporters who was asking whether or not Jiang had given an "imperial order" to appoint Tung to another term as chief executive.
- Vacation-style treatment (休假式治疗; xiūjià shì zhìliáo) – a euphemism used by the authorities in 2012 to explain the disappearance of Chongqing vice-mayor Wang Lijun who was likely forced from office and disappeared from public view due to a dispute with then party secretary Bo Xilai. Became a meme after internet users began parodying and ridiculing the phrase, comparing it with a similar euphemism "maintenance-oriented demolition" (维修性拆除); a sample post from Sina Weibo read: "Maintenance-oriented demolition, vacation-style treatment. Why don't we continue: consoling-style rape, harmony-oriented looting, environmentally-friendly-style killing, research-oriented theft."

== Other ==
- Martian script – A form of written Chinese which replaces standard graphs with unorthodox variations like the use of symbols, visually similar foreign scripts, the addition of radicals, and characters with added or removed strokes.

== See also ==
- List of internet phenomena
- Chinese internet slang
- Internet censorship in China
