= Yax Lizard =

Chinese internet phenomenon

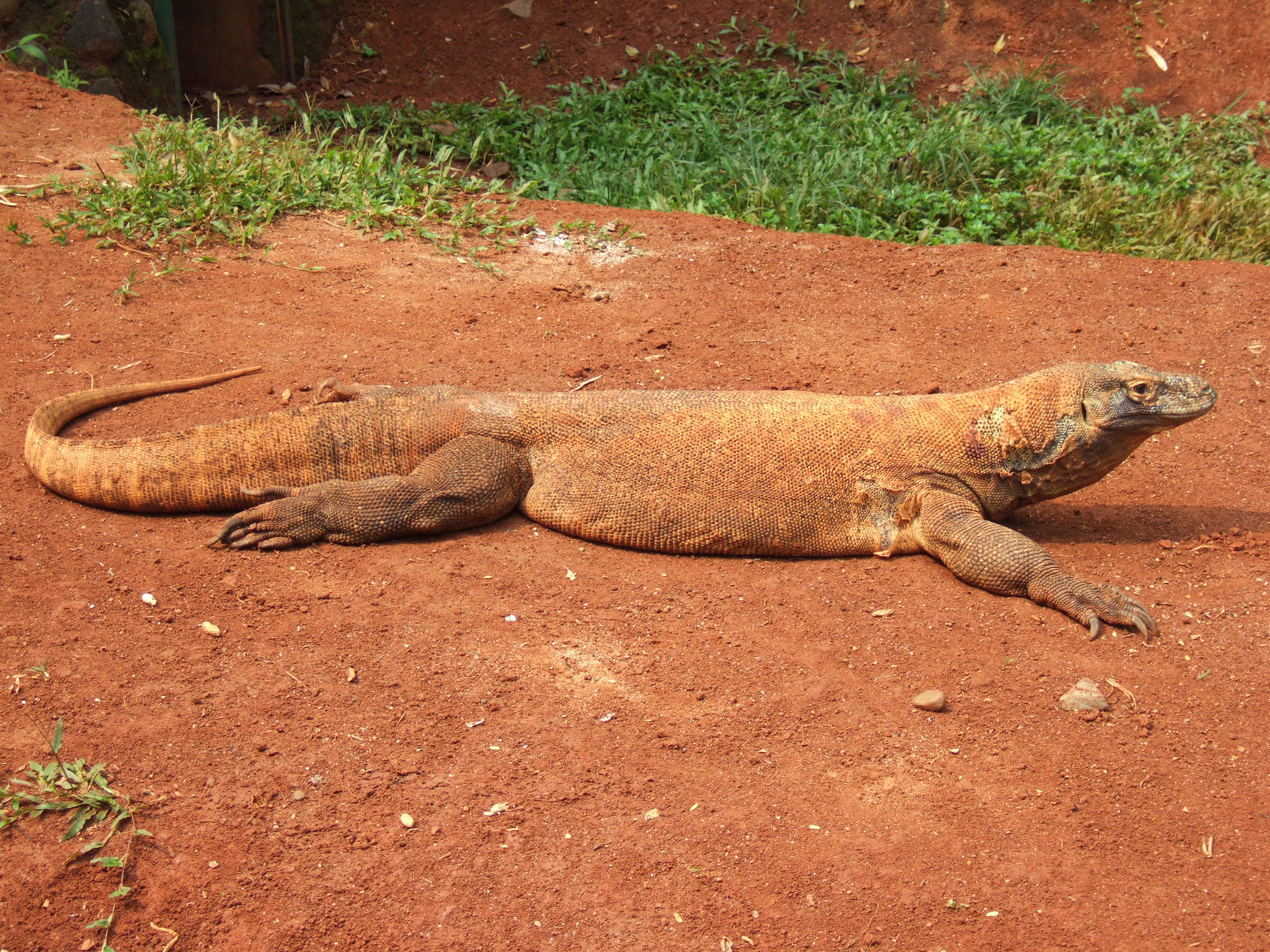
- A Komodo dragon

Chinese name
- Traditional Chinese: 亞克蜥
- Simplified Chinese: 亚克蜥
- Literal meaning: Yax Lizard
Transcriptions
Standard Mandarin
- Hanyu Pinyin: Yàkè Xī
- IPA: [jâkʰɤ̂ ɕí]

Jacques lizard
- Traditional Chinese: 雅克蜥
- Simplified Chinese: 雅克蜥
Transcriptions
Standard Mandarin
- Hanyu Pinyin: Yǎkè Xī

Uyghur name
- Uyghur: ياخشى
Transcriptions
- Latin Yëziqi: yaxshi
- Yengi Yeziⱪ: yahxi
- Siril Yëziqi: йахшиj

The Yax lizard or Jacques lizard is a Chinese internet phenomenon related to the Baidu 10 Mythical Creatures. It mocks a musical dance program that excessively praised the Chinese government.

The creature was supposedly a Komodo dragon. The name is derived from "yakexi" (Chinese: 亚克西; pinyin: yàkèxī), which is the Chinese transliteration of a Uyghur term "yaxshi" (Uyghur: ياخشى), which means "good" or "great"; "xi" also means "lizard" in Chinese.

== Origin ==
It is named after the Xinjiang musical dance program "Happy life Yaxshi" (Chinese: 幸福生活亚克西; pinyin: Xìngfú Shēnghuó Yàkèxī, formerly "The Party's Policy Yaxshi") in the CCTV Spring Festival's Gala 2010. In the program, singers and dancers sing praises of how happy their life is, with the chorus line of, "What is yakexi? What is yakexi? The Communist Party's policies are yakexi." (什么亚克西？什么亚克西？党中央的政策亚克西。)

== Description ==
Blogger Han Han said that Yax lizards live in the area between Gurbantünggüt Desert and Irtysh River, north to Dzungaria, Xinjiang. They eat snails and even mice. They also arrive at the riverine area of Irtysh River to eat dead fishes, river crabs, frogs and so on every year from April to June.

== Response ==
Han Han held a contest on his blog asking for submissions of alternative lyrics to the song, keeping the original chorus line of "What is yakexi? What is yakexi? The Communist Party's policies are yakexi." Submissions included lyrics mocking the original song by describing things such as bad housing situations and high tuition prices.

To demonstrate their dissatisfaction towards Chinese government's propaganda, some netizens name the species as "Yakshit" by the Chinese character's pronunciation.

== See also ==
- Grass Mud Horse
- River crab (Internet slang)
- Jia Junpeng
- Very erotic very violent
