= Very good very mighty =

Chinese catchphrase and internet meme

Very good very mighty (traditional Chinese: 很好很強大; simplified Chinese: 很好很强大; pinyin: hěn hǎo hěn qiáng dà; Jyutping: han^{2} hou^{2} han^{2} koeng^{4} daai^{6}) is a catch phrase and internet meme in China that originated with the WoW Chinese-translation group in June 2007. Using the syntactical structure very X very Y (很X很Y) became increasingly popular among netizens of mainland China as internet slang and snowclone.

== Very erotic very violent ==
In the December 27, 2007 edition of CCTV's daily newscast, Xinwen Lianbo, a primary school student described a pop-up she had seen on a website as being "very erotic, [and] very violent" (很黄很暴力) as part of an appeal to strengthen the already strict web filtering in the People's Republic of China. The statement quickly became a meme on Chinese web forums, primarily due to the nature and context of the comment, and that other parodies took advantage of the fact that huáng (黄), the Mandarin character for "erotic", can also refer to the color yellow.

== Very silly very naive ==
After the Edison Chen photo scandal, Gillian Chung made a statement during her first public appearance on February 11, 2008, to respond and apologize to the public for being naive and silly. This news was reported by media of mainland China with the title of “very silly very naive” (很傻很天真).

== Very sinister very strongly-backed ==
On March 29, 2008, two female students in Zhengzhou City had haircuts in a barbershop named Paul International and were asked to pay 12 thousand yuan (approximately US$1,700 at the time), and refused to let the students leave until they paid up the entire sum. When reporters came to investigate the incident, a spokesman for the barbershop said, "I have someone out there strongly backing me, you (the reporters) can do anything you want." This suggested that the barbershop had the backing of powerful local officials or business moguls and were free to do as they pleased without bowing to external oversight. In response, on April 3, 2008, some internet users went to the barbershop, which had been banned by the Administration for Industry and Commerce of Zhengzhou City, holding a banner with "very sinister [with] very strong backing" (很黑很後台) on it in protest Paul International's actions.

== See also ==
- Internet slang
- Grass Mud Horse
- List of internet phenomena
- Internet in the People's Republic of China
- Jia Junpeng
- Baidu 10 Mythical Creatures
- Doge (meme)
