= Grass Mud Horse =

Chinese internet meme

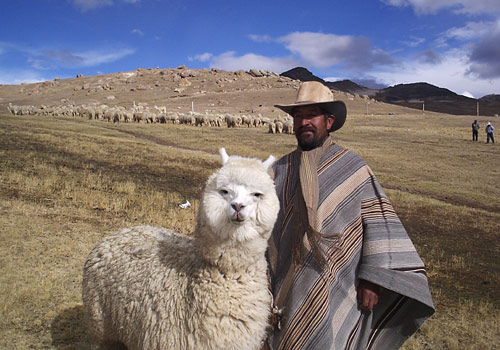
- Bolivian alpaca, also known as "Grass Mud Horse"
- Simplified Chinese: 草泥马
- Traditional Chinese: 草泥馬
- Literal meaning: Grass mud horse
Transcriptions
Standard Mandarin
- Hanyu Pinyin: Cǎonímǎ
- Bopomofo: ㄘㄠˇ ㄋㄧˊ ㄇㄚˇ
- Gwoyeu Romatzyh: Tsao Ni Maa
- Wade–Giles: Ts'ao^{3} ni^{2} ma^{3}
- Tongyong Pinyin: Cǎo ní mǎ
- Yale Romanization: Tsau^{3} ni^{2} ma^{3}
- MPS2: Tsǎu-ní-mǎ
Hakka
- Romanization: Chhó nài mâ
Yue: Cantonese
- Yale Romanization: Chóu nàih máh
- Jyutping: Cou2 nai4 maa5
- Canton Romanization: Cou^{2} nai^{4} ma^{5}
Southern Min
- Hokkien POJ: Chháu-nî-má
- Tâi-lô: Tsháu-nî-má

The Grass Mud Horse is a Chinese Internet meme and kuso parody based on a word play of the Mandarin profanity cào nǐ mā (肏你妈), which means "fuck your mother".

Homophonic puns are commonly used in Chinese language as silly humor to amuse people, and have become an important component of jokes and standup comedy in Chinese culture. Grass Mud Horse is one of the made-up "Baidu 10 Mythical Creatures" created in a hoax article on Baidu Baike in early 2009, whose names all come from obscene puns. It has become an Internet chat forum cult phenomenon in China and has garnered worldwide press attention, with videos, cartoons and merchandise of the animal (which is said to resemble the alpaca) having appeared. In the 2022 COVID-19 protests in China, Shanghai residents led "Grass Mud Horse" to protest on the streets.

== Etymology and species ==
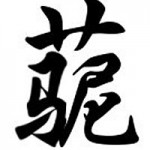
"" Chinese character invented by Netizens for "Grass Mud Horse"

The Caonima, literally "Grass Mud Horse", is supposedly a species of alpaca. The name is similar to a profanity (Chinese: 肏你妈/操你媽; pinyin: cào nǐ mā), "fuck your mother". The comparison with the "animal" name is not an actual homophone: the two terms have the same consonants and vowels with different tones, and are represented by different characters.

According to the original, anonymous article from Baidu Baike, Grass Mud Horses originate from an area known as the "Mahler Gobi" Desert (马勒戈壁; Mǎlè Gēbì, which resembles 妈了个屄; māle ge bī; "your mother's fucking cunt"). Some variants of the animal are known as "Fertile Grass Mud Horses" (沃草泥马; Wò Cǎonímǎ, which resembles 我肏你妈; Wǒ cào nǐ mā; "I fuck your mother").

The Grass Mud Horse can only eat fertile grass (沃草; wò cǎo, which resembles 我肏; Wǒ cào; "I fuck" or simply "Fuck!"). Other subspecies are known as "Crazy/Violent/Insane Grass Mud Horses" (狂草泥马; Kuáng Cǎonímǎ), which are considered the "kings" of the Caonima. The initial image found in the original Baidu Baike article was a zebra, but it was replaced with an alpaca in subsequent revisions.

== Habitat ==
Chinese seal carving work. The character is a combination of three characters, made by Chinese netizens as a satire of Chinese internet censorship.

Because the Grass Mud Horse is said to be the dominant species which lives within the Mahler Gobi Desert, the region is also called the "Grass Mud Horse Gobi" (草泥马戈壁; Cǎonímǎ Gēbì), which is close in pronunciation to 肏你妈个屄; cào nǐ mā ge bī; "fuck your mother's cunt"). The animal is characterised as "lively, intelligent and tenacious". However, their existence is said to be threatened by "river crabs" which are invading their habitat.

The river crab (河蟹; héxiè) symbolises internet censorship in China. Its pronunciation resembles the word for "harmony" (和谐; héxié), in reference to the "harmonious society", to which the Chinese leadership professes to aspire, and which Chinese internet censors use to justify internet censorship. As a result, when a post on a microblog is deleted, the censorship notice says that the post has been "harmonized" (和谐; héxié), so the netizens say that the post has been eaten by the "river crab".

The term "crab" itself is rural slang, meaning "a bully who uses power through force", and the "river crab" has become a symbol of crude censorship backed with the threat of force. The river crab is often depicted wearing three wristwatches, since 带三个表 (dài sān ge biǎo; "wears three watches") can be rearranged and altered to 三个代表; Sāngè Dàibiǎo, the ideology of the "Three Represents", an interpretation of communism promoted by former Chinese leader Jiang Zemin.

== Formats ==
Music videos and cartoons about the Grass Mud Horse started appearing on the internet in 2009. The original Grass Mud Horse music video's musical arrangement of a children's choir has been compared to It's a Small World, and it scored 1.4 million hits in its first three months. A cartoon about the Grass Mud Horse attracted a quarter million views, and a nature documentary on its habits received 180,000 more hits in the same amount of time. Even though some Grass Mud Horse videos were not technically blocked by Chinese censors, some had their sound blocked, with a message saying "This video contains an audio track that has not been authorized by WMG."

Yazhou Zhoukan (亞洲周刊) reported that Zhan Bin, a teacher at the Beijing Institute of Fashion Technology, created a new Chinese character by fusing the three Chinese character radicals for "grass", "mud", and "horse". The word has no official pronunciation. Official "cleanup" of the internet, which threatens the Caonima, has led Chinese internet users to create other "Mud Horse" variants, such as the 滾泥马; Gǔnnímǎ; "Rolling Mud Horse" and the "幹泥马; Gànnímǎ; "Working Mud Horse". "Gunnima" and "Gannima" are puns for "fuck off" and "fuck your mother" respectively.

The "Grass Mud Horse" became widely known on the English-language web following the publication of a New York Times article on the phenomenon on 11 March 2009, which sparked widespread discussion on blogs. In March 2011, "Grass Mud Horse" themed merchandise, such as plush dolls, began being sold over the Internet. One Guangzhou toy manufacturer reportedly produced its first batch of 150 Grass Mud Horse cuddly toys with official birth certificates issued by Mahler Gebi Mystical Creatures Bureau. The animals come in brown and white, named "Ma Le" (马勒) and "Ge Bi" (歌碧) respectively, and sell for 40 yuan each. To accompany these, a user's and feeding manual have been created. Whereas they were called 'Caonima' before the crackdown, Internet sellers now list them using the correct Chinese term, '羊驼' (Alpaca).

In 2009, renowned artist Ai Weiwei published an image of himself nude with only a 'Caonima' hiding his genitals, with a caption "草泥马挡中央" (cǎonímǎ dǎng zhōngyāng; 'a Grass Mud Horse covering the center'. One interpretation of the caption is: "fuck your mother, Communist Party Central Committee"). Political observers speculated that the photo may have contributed to Ai's arrest in 2011 by angering Chinese Communist Party hardliners.

According to a study by NordPass, caonima was the 43rd most common password in China in 2021.

== Grass Mud Horse Day ==
In 2012, Chinese netizens started to designate the date 1 July as the "Grass Mud Horse Day". The date coincides with the "Party Day" in China which celebrates the founding of the Chinese Communist Party.

== Political discourse ==
The China Digital Times sees Caonima as the "de facto mascot of netizens in China fighting for free expression, inspiring poetry, photos and videos, artwork, lines of clothing, and more." It is an illustration of the "resistance discourse" of Chinese internet users with "increasingly dynamic and sometimes surprising presence of an alternative political discourse: images, frames, metaphors and narratives that have been generated from Internet memes [that] undermine the values and ideology that reproduce compliance with the Chinese Communist Party's authoritarian regime, and, as such, force an opening for free expression and civil society in China."

Caonima is an expression of a broader Chinese internet culture of spoofing, mockery, punning, and parody known as e'gao, which includes video mash-ups and other types of bricolage.

== Censorship ==
The Beijing Television Cultural Center fire led to Chinese internet users creating a number of digitally manipulated image parodies, including one with a Caonima's outline in the smoke.

On 20 March 2009, the New York Times reported that a Chinese contributor to Global Voices Online posted a message from an Internet administrator to managers of online bulletin boards warning that "any content related with Grass-Mud Horse should not be promoted and hyped" because "the issue has been elevated to a political level ... The overseas media has exaggerated the incident as a confrontation between netizens and the government."

In a press conference on 25 March, the Foreign Ministry confirmed that China's access to YouTube had been officially blocked since two days earlier. According to Reporters Without Borders, the block was an attempt to stem videos showing Chinese repression of the Tibetan population in the run-up to the 50th anniversary of the Tibetan uprising of 10 March 1959, and to block access to the popular Grass Mud Horse video posted in early March.

The State Administration of Radio, Film, and Television issued a directive on 30 March 2009 to highlight 31 categories of content prohibited online, including violence, pornography, and content which may "incite ethnic discrimination or undermine social stability". Many netizens believe the instruction follows the official embarrassment over the rise of the "Grass Mud Horse" phenomenon. Industry observers believe that the move was designed to stop the spread of parodies or other comments on politically sensitive issues in the runup to the 20th anniversary of the 1989 Tiananmen Square protests and massacre.

Following the government's directive, most Chinese essays and blog postings made about the Grass Mud Horse have been removed from the Internet after being discovered by government censors. Some of these citizen efforts to keep the Grass Mud Horse alive have moved offshore to the U.S. and elsewhere, including for example the creation of an independent Canadian publishing house (see Mudgrass Press) referencing the meme.

The Caonima reappeared as a subject of online cartoon satire following the announcement of the Green Dam Youth Escort pornography-blocking software project.

== See also ==
- Chun Ge
- Internet in the People's Republic of China
- Jia Junpeng
- Mat (Russian profanity)
- Mother insult
- Very erotic very violent
- Yax Lizard
- Algospeak

== Bibliography ==
- "Chinese Bloggers Protest Blocking of YouTube". AsiaNews.it. 25 March 2009.
- Awflasher. "What is the Grass Mud Horse?". Youtube. 1 February 2009. Retrieved 18 February 2012. [Chinese].
- "The Grass Mud Horse". Baidu Baike. 2009. Archived from the original on 24 July 2011. [Chinese screenshot].
- "Introduction to the Grass-Mud Horse Lexicon". China Digital Times. The Berkley Counter-Power Lab.
- "Plush Your Mother: Grass Mud Horse Dolls In China". Daddytypes.com. 11 March 2009.
- Estes, Adam Clark (11 April 2011). "More Theories on Ai Weiwei's Arrest: Nude Photos, Plagiarism". Atlantic Wire. Archived from the original on 17 April 2011.
- Feifei2226. "The Grass Mud Horse Song, Animated Version, Bring Your Own Sunglasses!!!!!!". Youtube. 6 February 2009. Retrieved 18 February 2012. [Chinese].
- "China: Goodbye Grass Mud Horse". Global Voices. 18 March 2009.
- Li Yongfeng (5 April 2009). "Chinese Netizens create the Grass Mud Horse Phenomenon in order to Criticize the Foolishness of the Government". Yazhou Zhoukan (in Chinese). Vol. 23, no. 13. p. 8. Retrieved 24 February 2012.
- "Over 80 Develop the Guangzhou Version of the Grass Mud Horse". Nandu Daily (in Chinese). 5 March 2009. Archived from the original on 17 February 2012.
- Parker, John (14 April 2010). "Google vs China: The Endgame". Asia Times Online. Archived from the original on 16 April 2010.
- "The Original 2009 Popular Science Article on the Grass Mud Horse". PowerApple.com (in Chinese). 4 February 2009. Archived from the original on 5 March 2012.
- Rea, Christopher. "Spoofing (e'gao) Culture on the Chinese Internet". In Jessica Milner Davis; Jocelyn Chey, eds. (2013). Humour in Chinese Life and Culture: Resistance and Control in Modern Times. Hong Kong: Hong Kong University Press. pp. 149–172. Archived from the original on 15 December 2017.
- Sheridan, Michael (11 April 2011). "Ai Weiwei Held for 'Obscene' Political Art". The Australian. Archived from the original on 1 May 2011.
- Skippybently (12 March 2009). "Song of the Grass-Mud Horse (Cao Ni Ma)". Youtube.
- "Music Video: The Song of the Grass Mud Horse 《草泥马之歌》" (PDF). University of Pompeu Fabra, Barcelona. Archived from the original (PDF) on 20 February 2012.
- Wang, Jen; Nguyen, Diana (17 March 2009). "F*ck Your Mother Ship, F*ck Censorship". Huffington Post.
- Wen Yunchao (13 March 2009). "The 'Grass-Mud Horses' Battling Internet Censors". France24.
- Wines, Michael (11 March 2009). "A Dirty Pun Tweaks China's Online Censors". New York Times.
- Wines, Michael (20 March 2009). "China: Censors Bar Mythical Creature". New York Times.
- Xh1120. "Animal World Special on the Mahler Gobi's Grass Mud Horse". Youtube. 28 January 2009. Retrieved 18 February 2012. [Chinese].
- Xiaohe1120xu. "Animal World Special on the Mahler Gobi's Grass Mud Horse: Complete Version". Youtube. 7 February 2009. Retrieved 18 February 2012.
- James, Randy (18 March 2009). "A Brief History of Chinese Internet Censorship". Time magazine.
