= NMSL =

NMSL may refer to:

- National Maximum Speed Law, a speed limit applied throughout the United States between 1974 and 1995
- NMSL (Chinese: 你妈死了; pinyin: nǐmāsǐle; lit. 'Your mom is dead'), used as an insult, a Chinese Internet slang
