= Luo Yufeng =

Luo Yufeng may refer to:

- Sister Feng (born 1985), Chinese Internet celebrity now living in the U.S.
- Luo Yufeng (racing driver) (born 1998), Chinese race driver
