= Crazy Crab =

Crazy Crab may refer to:

- Crazy Crab, a mascot of the San Francisco Giants for the 1984 season
- Hermit Crab
- the pen name of the creator of the Chinese webcomic, Hexie Farm
