= Wangba =

Wangba may refer to:

- Wangba, a town in Li County, Gansu, China
- Wangba, a Chinese era name used by the Tang rebel Huang Chao from 878 to 880
- Wangba, a Mandarin Chinese profanity meaning "cuckold" or "turtle"
