= Yax =

Yax, yax or YAX may refer to:

- Angling Lake/Wapekeka Airport (IATA airport code: YAX), in Ontario, Canada
- Mbunda language (ISO 639 language code: yax)
- Yax Lizard, an urban legend lizard
- Hugo Alfredo Tale-Yax, a notable victim of the bystander effect
- a yak character in the Disney film Zootopia
- Yax, one of the 18 months of the Haab', a part of the Maya calendric system
