= China Digital Times =

US-based news site covering China

- Formation: 2003; 23 years ago
- Founder: Xiao Qiang
- Type: 501(c)(3) organization
- Tax ID no.: 45-5274376
- Headquarters: Berkeley, California
- Official language: English, Chinese
- Website: chinadigitaltimes.net

China Digital Times (CDT; Chinese: 中国数字时代) is a California-based 501(c)(3) organization that runs a bilingual news website covering China. The site focuses on news items which are blocked, deleted or suppressed by China's state censors.

== History ==
The website was started by Xiao Qiang of University of California, Berkeley's Graduate School of Journalism in fall 2003. Xiao has asserted that Chinese internet users are using digital tools to create new autonomous forms of political expression and dissent, "changing the rules of the game between state and society".

According to Freedom House, researchers at China Digital Times have reportedly identified over 800 filtered terms, including "Cultural Revolution" and "propaganda department". The types of words, phrases and web addresses censored by the government include names of Chinese high-level leadership; protest and dissident movements; politically sensitive events, places and people; and foreign websites and organizations blocked at network level, along with pornography and other content.

For many years, the site has leaked propaganda from the State Council Information Office, which oversees news websites in China.

The site also publishes the Grass-Mud Horse Lexicon, a wiki-based directory of Chinese Internet language. The project is named after the Grass Mud Horse (cǎo ní mǎ (simplified Chinese: 草泥马; traditional Chinese: 草泥馬)), a pun on the phrase cào nǐ mā (肏你媽), literally, "fuck your mother", and which is one of the Baidu 10 Mythical Creatures. The publication has also covered the backlash against increased censorship from China's independent media, and employees of state media.

In 2009, it published a set of documents leaked by a Baidu employee which revealed events, people and places that were deemed politically sensitive.

In 2013, China Digital Times published an English-language e-book, Decoding the Chinese Internet: A Glossary of Political Slang, which contains Chinese Internet language that criticizes the government.

== Staff and operations ==
Sophie Beach is the Executive Editor of its English site, and her writing about China has appeared in publications including the Los Angeles Times, the Asian Wall Street Journal, the South China Morning Post and The Nation magazine. The Translations Editor is Anne Henochowicz, an alumna of the Penn Kemble Democracy Forum Fellowship at the National Endowment for Democracy (NED). She has written for other publications including Foreign Policy, The China Beat, and the Cairo Review of Global Affairs.

China Digital Times provides content about China for The World Post, a partnership between The Huffington Post and the Berggruen Institute. The China Digital Times website is run by students of the university, with help from contributors from around the world. China Digital Times has historically been a recipient of funding from the NED, though funding was frozen in 2025 after Elon Musk's Department of Government Efficiency cut funding to the NED.

== Chinese government directives ==
A popular section on the China Digital Times site is 'Minitrue', which is short for 'Ministry of Truth'. The sections covers official government directives to media organizations, requiring them to censor or tone down postings on sensitive matters. In 2014, China Digital Times published an article which states that China's censors demanded that an article about a crackdown on terrorism be "prominently displayed" on the homepages of online news sites.
