= Diaosi =

Chinese social terminology

Diaosi (Chinese: 屌丝; pinyin: Diǎo Sī; lit. 'dick hair') is a Chinese Internet slang and buzzword, often used in a sarcastic and self-deprecating manner, that refers to a young beta male of mediocre sexual attractiveness and low social standing. Diaosi are often portraited as burnt-out salarymen, at-risk gig workers, poor students or NEETs who are born into a humble working class family with no social connections (guanxi) and upward mobility, and personally having little disposable income/savings, poor career advancement and no private ownership of cars, own housing and economic security. The term has become somewhat of a synonym for underdogs, who struggle hard against the constraints of their low upbringing, workplace bullying and the social stigma associated with poverty trap.

The slang was coined in October 2011 on Baidu Tieba and the meme soon began to spread across the Chinese internet. As the term went viral, Chinese youth (regardless of gender) from all backgrounds began to embrace it. It is slowly transforming into a descriptor of the ordinary Chinese commoner who faces everyday struggles and hardships, especially in the dating market where their mediocre socioeconomic status or low self-esteem diminishes their sexual market values and predisposes them to exploitation from dominating or even predatory spouses (known as laonü) who often demand asymmetrically high brideprice and property arrangement.

Socially, diaosi also has a lot of similarities with the Japanese term otaku, although the word zhainan (Chinese: 宅男; lit. 'house[-dwelling] man') is more of a direct equivalent with the latter.

== History ==
The term diaosi (屌丝), literal meaning "dick hair", first appeared in a flame war between two sub-forums of the BBS Baidu Tieba in October 2011. Netizens of the "Thunder Big Three" (雷霆三巨头) subforum posted an insult on the infamous Li Yi Bar calling the footballer Li Yi a "prick" and the fans of the Li Yi subforum "dick hairs", implying they are lowlifes, losers and incels whose only chance of getting close to a girl is as pubic hairs witnessing an alpha male having intercourse with one. Instead of taking offense, the netizens of Li Yi Bar found the swear word amusingly cool and decided to wear it like a badge of honor.

The slang term then emerged beyond Baidu Tieba and spread across the Chinese internet as a comedic insult, similar to the Western equivalent of "living in your mother's basement" – shorthand for "You're brave enough in a web forum but who are you in real life?" The term then became a buzzword referring to any young man born in a humble family, with mediocre appearance and standing and working in a dead-end job. He has few prospects, is unable to purchase luxuries; he is an outcast from the social mainstream. Their time is mostly spent on the computer, especially online games. Programmers and media industry workers have the highest percentage of self-identified diaosi. He also dreams of having a "goddess" as a girlfriend, but when interacting with said "goddess" he feels inferior and behaves awkwardly, knowing the "goddess" would only sleep with an gaofushuai (Chinese: 高富帅, literally "tall, rich and handsome", similar to the English slang "chad") who is his polar opposite, and the closest distance he would get to intimacy with the "goddess" is that of a dislodged pubic hair neglected alone on the bedsheet during coitus.

Like many insults, an initially vulgar epithet became a self-ascribed identity, in a classic example of a group on the outskirts of society claiming a once derogatory term as their own. Diaosi has become an almost universal identity among Chinese netizens. A survey conducted by Internet giant Sohu found that 64, 81 and 70 percent of people in their 20s, 30s and 40s, respectively, can identify themselves with the feeling of being a diaosi. Another report carried out by the Chinese gaming company Giant, in April 2013, says that some 529 million young people (approximately 40 percentage of the total population of China) across the country now embraces the term diaosi. Although diaosi is often translated as "loser" in English, this is becoming less and less apt, with the growth of diaosi's popularity. Loser remains an indisputably negative term, personal in its injury, while diaosi is a true meme: dynamic, complex, and current, cultural rather than personal. The ambiguous meaning of diaosi – both as an insult and tribal term – is similar to the American term, incel, whose loneliness, celibacy, and unrefined behavior can not only be a source of pride, but a culture in and of itself.

== Social background ==
Today, it is common to hear Chinese people proclaim that it's nearly impossible for children from disadvantaged backgrounds to gain entry to the country's upper class. The rate of students of rural background in a renowned university continues to decline. At the same time, the implementation of compulsory education means that more and more youngsters go to college, creating a surplus of educated young men who find it hard to enter the labour market. So not only do physical labourers feel they are marginalised by the society, the young men with a higher education background also feel helpless.

== See also ==
- Hillbilly
- Otaku
- Chigyu
- Redneck
- Yokel
- Incel
- Herbivore men
