= Hexie Farm =

Chinese internet comic opposed to censorship

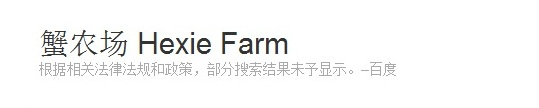
Hexie Farm's title as seen on the official blog. Below the title is the description provided by Baidu, roughly translating to:"According to relevant law regulations and policy, part of the results cannot be displayed. -Baidu".

Hexie Farm (simplified Chinese: 蟹农场; traditional Chinese: 蟹農場; pinyin: xiè nóngchǎng), by an author known as Crazy Crab, is an online political cartoon in China critical of the Chinese government. Hexie in Chinese Pinyin is a pun on harmony and river crab. The cartoon started running in August 2010, focusing on animal characters living in a "Harmonic Farm". It is loosely based on George Orwell's novel Animal Farm.

== Author ==
The author of Hexie Farm, who uses the pen name Crazy Crab, remains pseudonymous for safety reasons; no photo or personal information has been released. Crazy Crab is a fan of Calvin and Hobbes as well as Snoopy. The author began drawing political cartoons after reading news about Feng Zhenghu, and Tang Fu-zhen self-immolation incident.

== History ==
Hexie Farm was started in August 2010 and at the time focused on the life of the protagonist farm animals. The web cartoon quickly gained attention from Internet activists in China, and first gained media attention in July 2011. It used micro-blogging platforms in China such as Weibo to gain attention. By October 2011, Hexie Farm was recognized by the Chinese government and was officially banned in China. All content related to the cartoon was marked as harmful content and deleted from Chinese search engines and websites. Crazy Crab stated in an interview that they regard the censorship of their cartoons an honor.

On October 4, 2011, Crazy Crab launched the online campaign Dark Glasses Portrait to support the blind lawyer Chen Guangcheng. Following Chen's escape in April 2012 the campaign continued, though now in support of Chen's family, who were under arrest, with the motto "Together, let's support Guangcheng, aid Guangcheng, until Chen and his family are completely free!" (让我们一起，关注光诚，声援光诚，直至他和他的家人得到完全自由!).

In early 2012, Crazy Crab published multiple cartoons that were influenced by the self-immolation incidents in Tibet.

== See also ==
- Grass Mud Horse
- Euphemisms for Internet censorship in China
