= Chun Ge =

Nickname for the singer Li Yuchun

Chun Ge (simplified Chinese: 春哥; pinyin: Chūn Gē), which means "Brother Chun" and is often translated as "Spring Brother", is a nickname for the singer Li Yuchun, which subsequently became a popular Chinese Internet meme. In her early years as a Super Girl star, Li is known for her androgynous appearance.

The nickname literally translates to "Brother Chun" and is usually used in the popular catchphrase "chūn gē chún yémen (春哥纯爷们)", which means "Brother Chun is a real man". This catchphrase later evolved to a general phrase, "(person's name) is a real man". This catchphrase is used not only to mock androgynous women Li Yuchun, but also as an endorsement similar to saying someone can "hang with the boys". "Ye Men" (爷们) in Chinese is used in a way comparable to "bro" in the United States. 爷, meaning "grandfather", can also be read as "masculine" (young males in Northeast China use the slang term 爷 as a personal pronoun in an impolite context). "Chun" is Li Yuchun's first name.

== See also ==
- Grass Mud Horse
- River crab (Internet slang)
- Baidu 10 Mythical Creatures
