= Xiao Qiang =

American physicist and activist (born 1961)

- 萧强
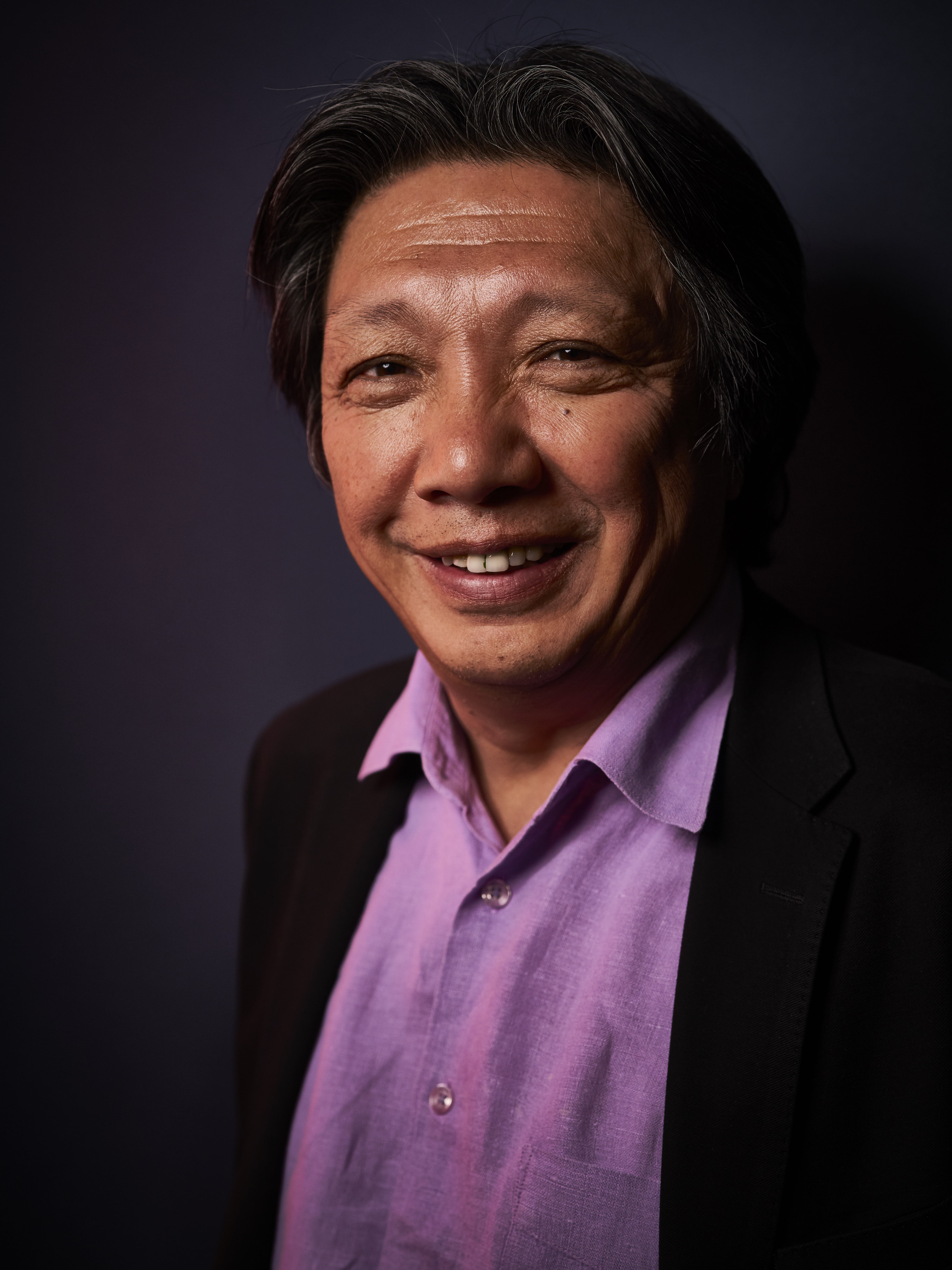
- Xiao in 2019
- Born: November 19, 1961 (age 64); China
- Education: University of Science and Technology of China; University of Notre Dame
- Occupation: Activist
- Employer: University of California at Berkeley
- Awards: MacArthur Fellow

Xiao Qiang (Chinese: 萧强; pinyin: Xiāo Qiáng, born November 19, 1961) is a Chinese-born American physicist and activist. He is the director and Research Scientist of Counter-Power Lab, an interdisciplinary faculty-student research group focusing on digital rights and internet freedom, based in the School of Information, University of California, Berkeley and is funded by the US Department of State. He also serves as the director of the China Internet Project at Berkeley. Xiao is an adjunct professor at the School of Information and the Graduate School of Journalism at the University of California, Berkeley. He is also the founder and editor-in-chief of China Digital Times, a bilingual news website.

Xiao teaches classes Digital Activism, Internet Freedom and Blogging in China at both the School of Information and the Graduate School of Journalism, University of California at Berkeley. In fall 2003, Xiao launched China Digital Times to explore how to apply cutting edge technologies to aggregate, contextualize and translate online information from and about China. His current research focuses on state censorship, propaganda and disinformation, as well as mass surveillance in China.

== Biography ==
A theoretical physicist by training, he studied at the University of Science and Technology of China and entered the PhD program (1986–1989) in astrophysics at the University of Notre Dame. He became a full-time human rights activist after the 1989 Tiananmen Square protests and massacre. Xiao was the executive director of the New York-based organization Human Rights in China from 1991 to 2002 and vice chairman of the steering committee of the World Movement for Democracy.

== Recognition ==
Xiao is a recipient of the MacArthur Fellowship in 2001, and is profiled in the book "Soul Purpose: 40 People Who Are Changing the World for the Better" (Melcher Media, 2003). He was also a visiting fellow of the Santa Fe Institute in Spring, 2002.

In January 2015, Xiao has been named to Foreign Policy magazine's Pacific Power Index, a list of "50 people shaping the future of the U.S.-China relationship." He was named on the list "for taking on China's Great Firewall of censorship."
