= China Internet Project =

The Berkeley China Internet Project (BCIP) is a participatory media and research network, with a focus on how the Internet affects China's media and politics. Based at the Graduate School of Journalism, University of California, Berkeley, the activities of BCIP are centered on the development of a set of participatory media projects, including China Digital Times (CDT) which explore cutting edge Web 2.0 applications to cover China. Its current director is Xiao Qiang.

Together with an interdisciplinary class and online knowledge base on Participatory Media, research projects on information and communication technology and human rights, BCIP aims to provide both a new lens on the complex and rapidly changing society and a locus of influence on events: enhancements of the effectiveness and civic impact of participatory media could accelerate the growth of citizen-engaged civil society and a rich and informed public sphere. It will also help develop critical knowledge and insight into how the digital communication revolution is interacting with China's society, media and politics and transforming China's future.
