= Tianditu =

Chinese official free web mapping service

Tianditu (天地图)
- Available in: Simplified Chinese
- Owner: State Bureau of Surveying and Mapping
- Website: www.tianditu.gov.cn
- Commercial: No
- Registration: Optional, required for commercial use
- Launched: 18 January 2011; 15 years ago

Tianditu
- Traditional Chinese: 天地圖
- Simplified Chinese: 天地图
- Literal meaning: world map (figurative)
Transcriptions
Standard Mandarin
- Hanyu Pinyin: tiāndì tú

Tianditu (Chinese: 天地图; also Map World in logos) is China's official free web mapping service. It was launched by China's State Bureau of Surveying and Mapping (SBSM) on 22 October 2010.

Tianditu seeks to offer functions similar to those provided by Google mapping service. The creation of Tianditu is seen as part of the Chinese government's strategy to squeeze Google out of the China market, eventually making Tianditu the main source of geographic information for Chinese users. This objective is also expressed in various government publications that describe Tianditu as the 'authoritative' source for online geographic information. For example, SBSM Director General Xu Deming expressed that the ultimate aim is to create 'one web, one map, and one platform', offering the most authoritative and comprehensive web mapping services to Chinese citizens. Xu Deming also emphasized that Tianditu would be a 'reliable and excellent national brand' in the field of online mapping services.

== History ==
The beta version of Tianditu was launched by SBSM on 22 October 2010. State media suggests that about 30 million users from over 210 countries and regions visited Tianditu after the beta version came online. After beta testing, Tianditu was officially launched on 18 January 2011. In June 2011, a trial version for mobile phones was launched. And in October 2011, the mobile phone version was officially launched.

In 2020, 10 million km^{2} of 2m resolution imagery and 5.37 million km^{2} of better than 1m resolution imagery was added.

== Licensing ==
Five months before Tianditu as launched in October 2010, the SBSM required all companies providing online map services in China hold a license, and requires them to maintain their mapping servers in China.

== Relations with Google ==
The requirement to locate servers in China has created a problem for Google in China, which insists on controlling its data and servers. In 2009, Google’s mainland servers experienced major cyberattacks (presumably from the Chinese government), and in March 2010, Google re-directed its search engine from Google.cn in mainland China to Google.com.hk in Hong Kong.

== Criticisms ==
In 2010 it was found that Tianditu used the same DigitalGlobe sourced imagery as used by Google Maps and Google Earth. Users in China and elsewhere have posted images extracted from Tianditu and Google to make a comparison and found images from both sources to be identical, except that those from Tianditu were in Chinese. There have also been complaints about the quality of the service because the data is only updated about twice a year, while Google can update its information more frequently, as often as every few minutes if it wishes. As of 2012, 10,000 km^{2} (3,900 mi^{2}) of Ziyuan 3-01 captured imagery was also used.

== Disputed areas ==
Tianditu follows Chinese international territorial claims, without any indication that areas are disputed. Other Chinese mapping services, such as Amap and Baidu Maps, follow similar practices. For example, Taiwan is labeled as a province of China. The Spratly Islands in the South China Sea are also included as the Chinese territory, although Vietnam and the Philippines also claim these islands. The nine-dash line is drawn around them. Arunachal Pradesh is also labeled as a part of Tibet, belonging to China, while India claims it is part of India.

In addition, Tianditu also shows the partially recognized states of Kosovo as part of Serbia (see China-Serbia relations) and Russian-occupied territories of Georgia as part of Georgia.

== See also ==
- AutoNavi
- Baidu Maps
