= High-level black =

Chinese internet slang

High-level black (Chinese: 高级黑; pinyin: Gāojíhēi) is a Chinese term referring to the use of exaggerated praise on the surface as an act of criticism.

== History ==
The term was first used by People's Daily on 30 June 2014, which criticized journalists online for discouraging a top college entrance exam taker from Jiangsu from entering journalism. On 29 December 2016. the Cyberspace Administration of China published the "How to Prevent the ‘High-Level Black’ of Damning Praise". On 19 April 2018, People’s Daily deputy editor-in-chief Wang Yibiao published an article called "The New Era Calls for Building a Favorable Online Public Opinion Ecology", where he cited an example of internet users playing a role in attacking the "high-level blacking" of Liu Hulan, a young female revolutionary during the Chinese Civil War. On 28 February 2019, the "Central Committee Opinions on Strengthening the Party’s Political Construction" was released, which called for opposition to high-level black, saying that it would not permit "two-faced outer devotion and internal opposition toward the Party’s Central Committee, any double-dealing or ‘false reverence’".
