= Homophonic puns in Standard Chinese =

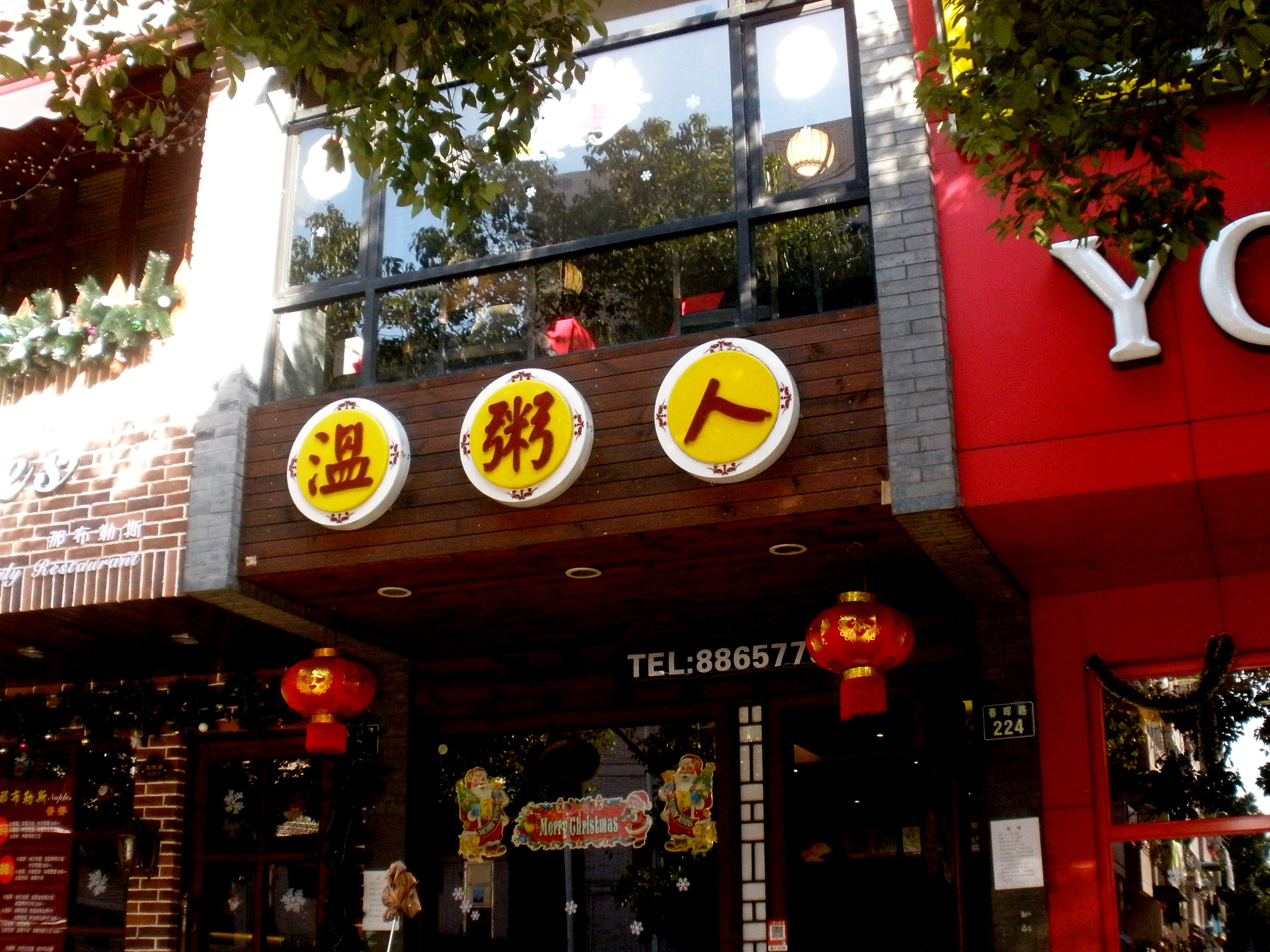
A sign for a porridge shop in Wenzhou which puns Wenzhounese people 溫州人/Wēnzhōurén, altering the second character 州/zhōu to an exact homophone 粥/zhōu meaning porridge, giving 溫粥人 (lit. warm-porridge-people)

Standard Chinese, like many Sinitic varieties, has a significant number of homophonous syllables and words due to its limited phonetic inventory. The Cihai dictionary lists 149 characters representing the syllable "yì". (However, modern Chinese words average about two syllables, so the high rate of syllable homophony does not cause a problem for communication.) Many Chinese take great delight in using the large amount of homophones in the language to form puns, and they have become an important component of Chinese culture. In Chinese, homophones are used for a variety of purposes from rhetoric and poetry to advertisement and humor, and are also common in Chinese loans, for example phono-semantic matching of brand names, computer jargon, technological terms and toponyms.

This article lists common homophonous puns in Mandarin Chinese, though many of the examples given are homophones in other varieties as well. Asterisks before the entry denote near-homophones.

== Terms in Chinese ==
There is no common Chinese word for "pun" in the oral language, although the phrase 一语双关; 一語雙關; yī yǔ shuāng guān may sometimes be used. 双关语; 雙關語; shuāngguānyǔ has the same meaning as a pun but has a more formal or literary register, such as 'double-entendre' in English. It typically refers to the creation of puns in literature. Homophonic puns in particular are called 音义双关; 音義雙關; yīn yì shuāng guān or more simply 谐音; 諧音; xiéyīn; 'homophones' while homophonic characters are called 同音字; tóngyīnzì.

== Spring Festival traditions ==
Chinese New Year, known in China as Spring Festival, has an abundance of unique traditions associated with it. Some of these traditions are more widespread than others. Among the many New Year's customs are a few whose meaning is derived from puns of Mandarin words.

- Nián nián yǒu yú - 年年有餘 "There will be an abundance every year" homophonous with 年年有魚 "There will be fish every year." As a result, fish are eaten and used as common decorations during Chinese New Year.
- Nián gāo - 年糕 "niangao" homophonous with 年高 from 年年高升 nián nián gāoshēng or "raised higher each year," leading to the belief that those who eat niangao should have greater prosperity with each coming year.
- Fú dào le - 福到了 "fortune has arrived" and 福倒了 "fortune is upside down", the latter simply referring to the character 福 (fú), which when displayed upside down denotes one's good fortune has arrived. It is common practice to hang the character upside-down on doors during the Spring festival.
- Shengcai - Traditionally the first meal of the New Year is vegetarian with a variety of ingredients. The meal is served with lettuce (生菜; shēngcài) because the word is near homophonous to "生財" (shēng cái), "to make money". Lettuce shows up in other New Years customs as well. In the traditional New Year's Day lion dance lettuce and red envelopes of cash are offered to the lion.
- Tāng yuán - At times of reunion, such as Spring Festival, it is customary to eat sweet round dumplings called tangyuan (湯圓). The tangyuan are traditionally eaten during Lantern Festival, which is the last day of the Chinese New Year celebration. The roundness of the tangyuan and the bowls they are eaten out of emphasize unity in addition to the similarity of their name with the Mandarin word for reunion, "團圓" (tuán yuán).
- Fā cài (髮菜), a thin black hair-like algae, is a feature of Spring Festival cuisine because its name is a near-homophone of "發財" (fā cái), meaning "prosperity," and as in the Chinese New Year greeting 恭喜發財; Gōngxǐ fācái; 'Congratulations and be prosperous'.

== Literature ==
- Dream of the Red Chamber – Similar to Dickens or Dostoevsky, Cao Xueqin chose many of the names of his characters in Dream of the Red Chamber to be homophones with other words which hint at their qualities. For example, the name of the main family, "賈" (Jiǎ) puns with "假" meaning "fake" or "false" while the name of the other main family in the story, "甄" (Zhēn) puns with "真" meaning "real" or "true".
- Hóng Qiū (紅秋) – In this Sichuan opera, a sternsman on the boat asks a nun her name; it is 陳 chén which is a homophone with 沉 or 'to sink'.
- Máo Dùn – Noted 20th-century author Shen Yanbing is better known by his pseudonym Mao Dun (茅盾), a homophone for "contradiction" (矛盾), more specifically the shield and spear paradox. The pun is said to be a statement of his disillusionment with the ruling Kuomintang party following the Shanghai massacre of 1927.
- Fǎng Zǐjiǔ Huà – Yun Shouping, an artist of the early Qing dynasty, is best known today for his paintings of flowers, but he was also a prolific poet. One of his poems, "仿子久畫" ("After the artistic style of Zijiu"), was an ode to a previous master of traditional Chinese landscape painting, Huang Gongwang who was also known by his style name "Zijiu" (子久). The poem has several intentional puns. The poem and alternative readings are included below:

Original

古人有子久
今人無子久
子久不在茲
誰能和子久
此不作子久
而甚似子久

English translation

Long were you with the ancients;
Our contemporaries have long missed you.
Long have you not been here;
But who can be said to have known you for a long time?
This one cannot act like you for long,
And yet he has long much resembled you

Alternative interpretation

The ancients had Zijiu; 
Our contemporaries have no Zijiu.
Zijiu is not here;
Who can know Zijiu?
This one cannot be Zijiu,
But he strongly resembles Zijiu.

- Paulownia tomentosa in Chinese is 梧桐 wútóng phonetically and tonally similar to 吾同 wútong "we together", often used in poems.

== Circumventing internet censorship ==
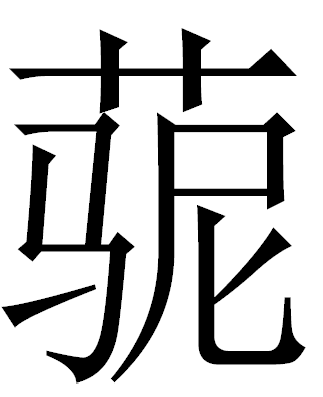
"" an internet character for the grass-mud horse containing three elements cǎo (as the grass radical), mǎ as a semantic component, and ní appearing to give the pronunciation.

Homophonic puns are often used to get around various forms of censorship on the internet.

- Hexie - 河蟹 hé xiè "river crab" for 和谐 héxié for "harmony", referring to the official policy of a "harmonious society", which led to Internet censorship.
- Dàibiǎo - 戴表; dàibiǎo "watch" (n., as in "wristwatch") for 代表; dàibiǎo "represent" referring to the "Three Represents", a political ideology.
- Cao ni ma - 草泥馬; cǎonímǎ, "a horse made from mud and grass"/"mud-grass horse" for 肏你媽; cào nǐ mā, "fuck your mother", used in mainland China similarly to "fuck you" in English.
- #Mi tu - #米兔; #mǐtù, "rice bunny", sounds like "#MeToo", referring to the (online) awareness campaign against sexual abuse and sexual harassment.

== Text messages and internet chat ==
Shortening words and phrases is a common and often necessary practice for internet chat and especially SMS text messages in any language. Speakers of Mandarin Chinese have also developed conventional abbreviations for commonly used words. Some of these are based on homophony or near-homophony.

- 88 (bābā) is pronounced similarly to 拜拜 "bàibài" or the Chinese loanword for "bye-bye." It has therefore become a common way of saying "see you later" when leaving a conversation, similar to "ttyl" or "talk to you later" in English.
- 3Q (/sæn kʰju/) ) - The number 3 is pronounced as "sān" [sán] in Mandarin, so this combination sounds like English "thank you" (/θæŋk.ju/) and is used as such.
- 55555 - The number 5, "wǔ" in mandarin, makes this series evoke the sound of a person sobbing.

== Joke names ==
- Dù Zǐténg - the Chinese characters "杜紫藤" form a very refined name that could belong to a poet (紫藤 is the name for the Wisteria sinensis flower), but it is homophonous with the word 肚子疼 which means "stomachache."
- Jìyuàn - the names of technical schools which end in 技術學院 jìshù xuéyuàn are often shortened to 技院 'jìyuàn' which has the same pronunciation as 妓院 which means a brothel.

== Political criticism ==
Critics of government policy in China have frequently employed puns as a means of avoiding criticizing the government too directly.

- Xiǎo Píngzi - Students participating in the pro-democracy movement in Beijing's Tiananmen Square in 1989 smashed little bottles as a means of protesting Deng Xiaoping's handling of the movement. Deng's given name, Xiaoping (小平) sounds a lot like "Little Bottle" (小瓶子, xiǎo píngzi), which is a nickname that Deng had acquired for his ability to keep afloat amid wave after wave of attacks.
- Wàn Lǐ - Students at Peking University in Beijing protesting the crackdown on the pro-democracy movement in Beijing's Tiananmen Square displayed on their dorm, in order, portraits of the revered Zhou Enlai, the serving politician Wan Li and the detested leader Li Peng, who had been orphaned and raised by Zhou and his wife Deng Yingchao. Here, Wàn Lǐ (万里) also means "10,000 li (Chinese miles)" so this was a way of saying that Li Peng is nothing like Zhou Enlai (there are 10,000 li between them).
- Liú & bō - Supporters of the jailed Chinese dissident Liu Xiaobo often pun on his name using the phrase "随波逐劉" (suí bō zhú Liú) instead of "随波逐流" meaning “by the waves and with the flow” which by extension means to follow blindly. The usage of the phrase is turned around however. The character 流 liú or "flow" is a homophone with the surname Liu/劉 and the character 波; bō is how a friend would call someone named Xiaobo. So the phrase may also be interpreted as "Go with Xiaobo, follow Liu," such repetition being common in Chinese rhetoric, taking on the meaning of "follow Liu's example" or "be like Liu."

== Gifts ==
In Chinese culture the giving of certain gifts is traditionally avoided because of unfortunate homophony or near homophony.

- Si - four (四) death (死) while it is common to give gifts in even number increments, giving four of something is associated with very bad fortune because in Mandarin the word four (四, sì) is pronounced similarly to the word death (死, sǐ), see tetraphobia. This taboo exists in Japanese and Korean as well, where the words are exact homophones shi in Japanese and sa in Korean.
- Lí - Pears (梨, lí) are also uncommon gifts as they sound like separation (离, lí).
- Sòng zhōng - Giving a clock (送鐘/送钟, sòng zhōng) is often taboo, especially to the elderly as the term for this act is a homophone with the term for the act of attending another's funeral (送終/送终, sòngzhōng). This can also be regarded as counting the seconds until the recipient's death. Cantonese people thus consider such a gift as a curse. A UK government official Susan Kramer gave a watch to Taipei mayor Ko Wen-je unaware of such a taboo which resulted in some professional embarrassment and a pursuant apology. The homonymic pair works in both Mandarin and Cantonese, although in most parts of China only clocks and large bells, and not watches, are called "zhong", and watches are commonly given as gifts in China.

Should such unlucky gifts be given, the "unluckiness" of the gift can traditionally be countered by exacting a small monetary payment so the recipient is buying the clock and thereby counteracting the '送' ("gift") expression of the phrase.

== Objects of good fortune ==
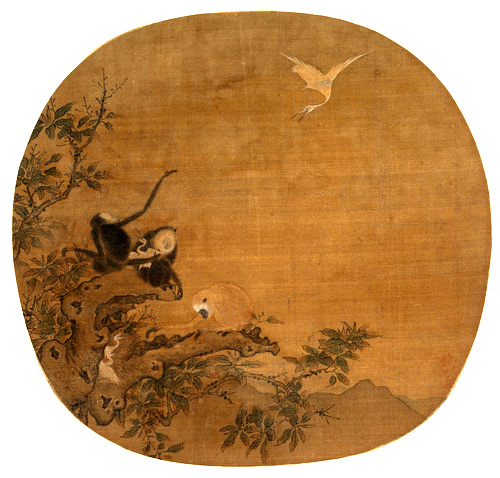
Three gibbons catching egrets by Yi Yuanji

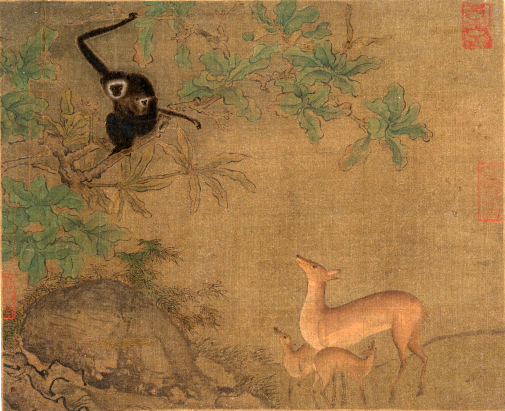
Gibbons and deer by unknown Southern Song dynasty artist

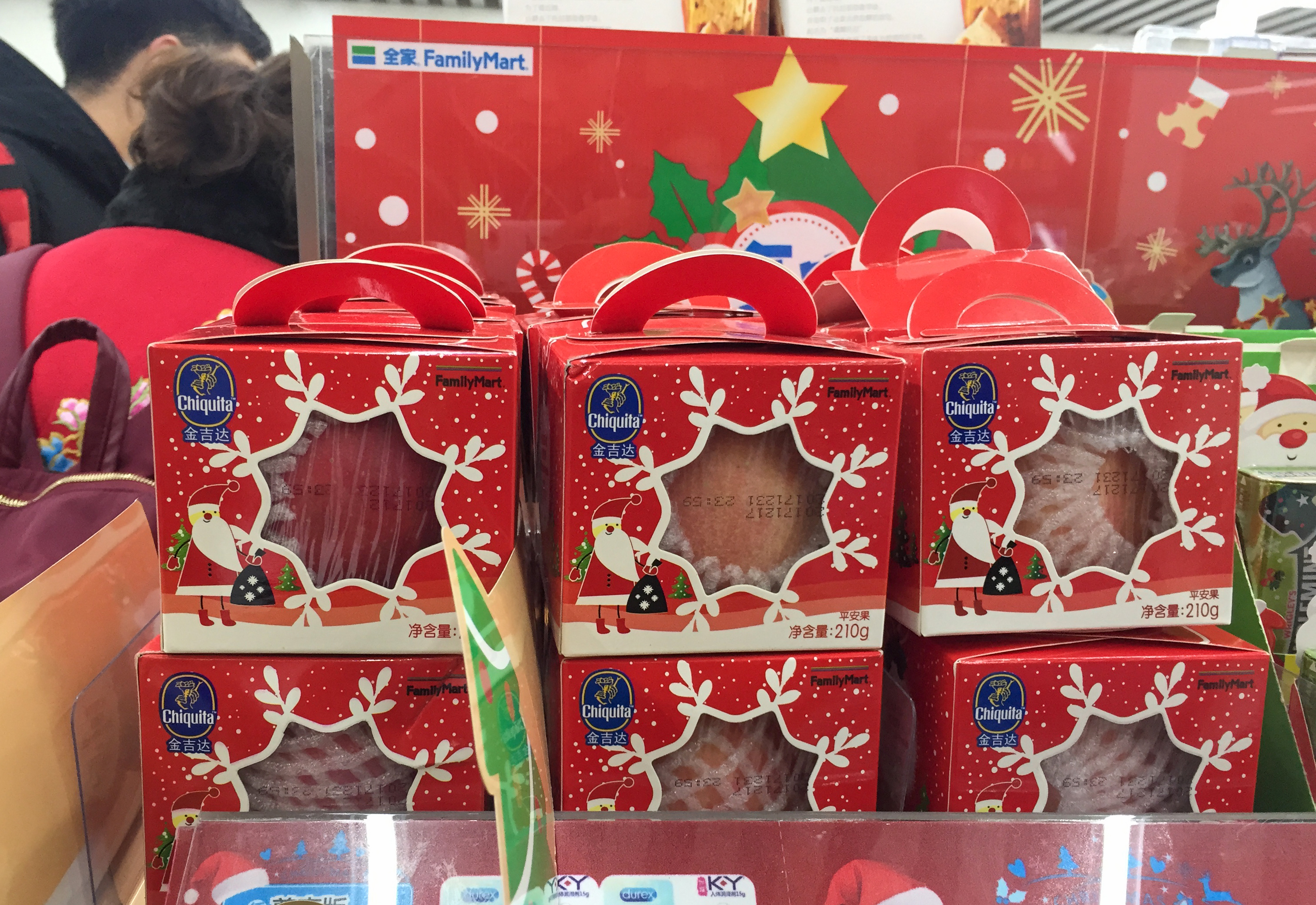
Píngānguǒ ("Peace apples") on sale in Beijing for Christmas Eve (2017)

A symbolic language of prosperity and good fortune has evolved over the centuries from the similarity in pronunciation between some every day objects and common lucky words. Examples are especially common in the decorative arts.

- Ping'an - In some localities it is customary to always place a vase (瓶, píng) on a table (案，àn) when moving into a new home for good luck, because the combination sounds like "平安" (píng'ān) meaning peace and tranquility. Apples are also an object symbolising peace, since the sounds of the first element ("píng") in the word for apple, "苹果" (Píngguǒ) and 平安 (Píng'ān) are homophonous in Mandarin and Cantonese. When these two words are combined, the word "平安果" (Píngānguǒ) meaning "Peace apples" is formed. This association developed further as the name for Christmas Eve in Mandarin is " 平安夜" (Píngānyè), translating to "Peaceful/Quiet Evening", which made the gifting of apples at this season to friends and associates popular, as a way to wish them peace and safety. This makes the Peace/Apple pun a triple entendre.
- Kuaizi - A traditional wedding custom involves bride and groom exchanging chopsticks, because the word for chopsticks, "筷子" (kuàizi) puns with "快子" (kuàizǐ) which means to quickly have a son.
- Fú - Bats are a common motif in traditional Chinese painting, because the word for bat, "蝠" (fú) is homophonous with the word for good fortune, "福" (fú).
- Li, yú, and lián - A more complex example involves the common image of carp swimming through lotus flowers which conveys the wish for continuing profits. Carp (鯉, lǐ), fish (魚, yú), and lotus (蓮, lián) are near-homophonous with "profit" (利, lì), "surplus" (餘, yú), and "successive" (連, lián) respectively.
- Sānyuán - In the eleventh century in the Northern Song dynasty men who scored first in all three levels of the civil service examination were distinguished with the title "Sanyuan" (三元) meaning simply "three firsts." Immediately following the appearance of this term in Chinese literature, the motif of the three gibbons pursuing egrets appears in Chinese painting. In Chinese the scene could be described as "三猿得鷺" (sān yuán dé lù) a pun on "三元得路" (also sān yuán dé lù) meaning "a triple-first gains one power." Soon, the gibbon became a more generalized symbol, praising those who participated in the civil service exam regardless of whether they achieved three firsts. Thus, the image expresses a wish that its recipient do well on his exams and become successful. Later a variation on the gibbons and egret motif appears through the substitution of deer for egrets. In mandarin the word "鹿" (lù), meaning deer, is homophonous with "鷺" (lù), meaning egret, and so the image achieves the same pun.

== Other notable puns ==
The Chinese Recorder and Missionary Journal for December 1882 claims that the residents of the western hills outside Beijing were not allowed to store ice at that time because of the similarity between the word for "ice" (冰, "bīng") and the word for "soldier" (兵, "bīng"). At this time the capital was under considerable threat of rebellions. The rule is presumably an attempt to avoid confusion between troops convening outside the city ahead of an invasion and the otherwise common practice of storing large quantities of ice for the preservation of meat and vegetables.

Following the Cultural Revolution, the Chinese Communist Party vigorously promoted the slogan "向前看" ("xiàng qián kàn") meaning "Look forward [to the future]". The slogan was an oft-repeated encouragement which emphasized working toward a common destiny and discouraged deep analysis of past policies. Today it is common to hear "xiàng qián kàn", but it is often accompanied by a gesture of thumb and fore-fingers rubbing together to indicate that the speaker is talking about money. The new phrase, "向錢看" is pronounced exactly the same, but its meaning, "look for the money," contrasts sharply with the old slogan. The popularity of this pun is explained as a result of the dramatic move towards capitalism that took place in China following the country's reform and opening up.

Project 571 (五七一工程; Wǔqīyī gōngchéng), the numeric codename for an alleged plot by supporters of Lin Biao to attempt a coup d'etat and overthrow Mao Zedong in 1971, was named by Lin Biao's son Lin Liguo as a play on its near-homonym of "armed uprising" (武裝起義; wǔzhuāng qǐyì or 武起義; wǔ qǐyì).

== See also ==
- Lion-Eating Poet in the Stone Den
- Numbers in Chinese culture
- Mandarin Chinese profanity
- Faux pas derived from Chinese pronunciation
- Standard Chinese phonology
- Kyowa-go
