= Baidu 10 Mythical Creatures =

Chinese internet meme

The Baidu 10 Mythical Creatures (simplified Chinese: 百度十大神兽; traditional Chinese: 百度十大神獸; pinyin: bǎidù shí dà shénshòu), alternatively Ten Baidu Deities, was a humorous hoax from the interactive encyclopedia Baidu Baike which became a popular and widespread Internet meme in China in early 2009.

These ten hoaxes are regarded by Western media as a response to online censorship in China of profanity, and considered as an example of citizens' clever circumvention of censorship.

== Details ==
Arising in early 2009, the meme began as a group of vandalised contributions to Baidu Baike. A series of humorous articles was created describing fictional creatures, each animal with a name vaguely referring to a Chinese profanity (utilizing homophones and characters having different tones). Eventually, images, videos (such as faux-documentaries) and even a song regarding aspects of the meme were released. It was thought that the Baidu hoaxes were written in response to recent strict enforcement of keyword filters in China, introduced in 2009, which attempted to eliminate all forms of profanity. The Baidu Baike "articles" initially began with "Four Mythical Creatures" (The "Grass Mud Horse", "French-Croatian Squid", "Small Elegant Butterfly" and "Chrysanthemum Silkworms"), and were later extended to ten.

The memes were widely discussed on Chinese Internet forums, and most users concluded that the initial aim of the hoaxes was to satirise and ridicule the pointlessness of the new keyword filters. The meme is interpreted by most Chinese online as a form of direct protest rather than motiveless intentional disruption to Baidu services. After the hoaxes were posted, news of the articles spread quickly online on joke websites, popular web portals and forums such as Baidu Tieba, while a large number of posts were sent on the Tencent QQ Groups chat service. There have also been various parodies of the meme created (such as the "Baidu 10 Legendary Weapons" and "Baidu 10 Secret Delicacies"). Meme references can be found throughout Chinese websites.

== The 10 Mythical Creatures ==
The mythical creatures have names which are innocuous in written Chinese, but sound similar to and are recognizable as profanities when spoken. References to the creatures, particularly the Grass Mud Horse, are widely used as symbolic defiance of the widespread Internet censorship in China; censorship itself is symbolized by the river crab, a near-homophone of harmony (a euphemism for censorship in reference to the Harmonious Society).

=== Cao Ni Ma ===
Cao Ni Ma (草泥马, Cǎo Ní Mǎ), literally 'Grass Mud Horse', was supposedly a species of alpaca. The name is derived from cào nǐ mā (肏你妈), which translates to 'fuck your mother'. Note that the comparison with the "animal" name is not an actual homophone, but rather the two terms have the same consonants and vowels with different tones, which are represented by different characters. Their greatest enemy are "river crabs" (河蟹, héxiè, resembles 和谐 héxié meaning 'harmony', referring to government censorship to create a "harmonious society", while noting that river crabs are depicted wearing three wristwatches, vaguely referring to the Three Represents, where 代表 'represent' and 戴表 'to wear a watch' are homophones, both pronounced dàibiǎo), and are said to be frequently seen in combat against these crabs.

Videos of songs, as well as "documentaries" about "Grass Mud Horse" started appearing on YouTube and elsewhere on the Internet. The video scored some 1.4 million hits; a cartoon attracted a quarter million more views; a nature documentary on its habits received 180,000 more.

The "Grass Mud Horse" became widely known on the English-language web following the 11 March 2009 publication of a New York Times article on the phenomenon, sparking widespread discussion on blogs, and even attempts to create "Grass Mud Horse" themed merchandise, such as plush dolls.

=== Fa Ke You ===
Fa Ke You (法克鱿, Fǎ Kè Yóu), literally 'French-Croatian Squid' (with the name derived from the direct Chinese transliteration of fuck you in English), was supposedly a species of squid discovered simultaneously by France (法国) and Croatia (克罗地亚), hence the name. The Baidu Baike article claims that "Fa Ke You" is a species of invertebrate, aggressive squid found in Europe. When agitated, it is said that they release a form of "white-coloured liquid", i.e. semen. These squids are said to cause great harm to humans when attacked. When some of these squids reached East Asia, it is said that they became hunted, and eaten with corn. Such a dish is known as yù mǐ fǎ kè yóu (玉米法克鱿, "Corn French-Croatian Squid", referring to the fans of Li Yuchun, dubbed "corns"), being one of the world's top five greatest delicacies. An alternate name for the dish in question is 非主流的法克鱿 (fēi zhǔ liú de fǎ kè yóu, 'Non-mainstream French-Croatian Squid'). This is apparently due to the behaviour of these squids, which do not inhabit major rivers, or the "main stream" of a river system, thus scientists dubbing them as squids with "deviant behaviour".

=== Ya Mie Die ===
Ya Mie Die (雅蠛蝶, Yǎ Miè Dié), literally 'Small Elegant Butterfly', is derived from Japanese yamete (止めて), meaning 'stop', a reference to the rape genre in Japanese pornography and the common Chinese stereotypes of the Japanese as being erotomanic, misogynistic and perverted. It was supposedly a type of butterfly discovered on 1 January 2009 on the Tibetan Plateau, and that legends state that there was once a Japanese girl who turned into these butterflies after harsh pressures during a romantic relationship. The original article states that these butterflies are able to change colour, and are luminescent, naturally emitting light from their wings. This is due to the cold temperatures and low oxygen environment these butterflies live in. There are an estimated 14,000 butterflies living throughout the world, and thus are considered to be precious and highly uncommon.

=== Ju Hua Can ===
Ju Hua Can (菊花蚕, Jú Huā Cán), literally 'Chrysanthemum Silkworms' (referring to pinworms, where the term Chrysanthemums (júhuā) is vulgar slang which refers to the anus). This referred to Chrysanthemum Terrace, a song by Jay Chou, where the lyrics "菊花残，满地伤" ("The chrysanthemums are scattered, the ground filled with the wounded") are re-rendered with homophones and similar sounds as "菊花蚕，满腚伤" ("Chrysanthemum (anus) worms, buttocks covered with wounds"). Ju Hua Can can also be interpreted as a pun on another homophone, 菊花残, meaning 'broken chrysanthemum', which would be slang for a "broken anus", referring to (possibly painful) anal sex, as 残 is a homophone meaning "broken". Such a phrase implies hopelessness, as once a person is given a "broken anus", they would find difficulty in sitting down, and so "broken Chrysanthemum" is a common (vulgar) Chinese idiom. These silkworms are said to feed on chrysanthemum flowers rather than mulberry leaves (from the article). The article also states that the usage of Chrysanthemum Silkworms dates back to 3000 years ago in Ancient China, and that they were the first cultivation method of silk obtained by early scientists. The silk produced by silkworms that feed on chrysanthemums rather than mulberry are able to be produced at a much faster rate, are higher in mass, are fireproof, protective against ionizing radiation, bulletproof, and lightweight. However, these silkworms are very difficult to maintain, and easily die. They are vulnerable to cold, heat, and are susceptible to changes in humidity, and thus are very costly to nurture. Noblewomen from ancient times are said to pay large sums of money for such types of silk.

=== Chun Ge ===
Chun Ge (鹑鸽, Chún Gē), literally 'quail-pigeon', is a homophone with 春哥 ('Brother Chun'). This species of bird is apparently found only in Sichuan and Hunan; formerly found in the area that is now the Republic of Yemen.

The term Big Brother Chun (春哥) has been used to refer to the female singer Li Yuchun due to her apparent androgynous appearance. Yemen comes from the catchphrase chūn gē chún yé men (春哥纯爷们), meaning 'Brother Chun is a real man' — 爷, meaning 'grandfather', can also be read as 'masculine' (young males in Northeast China use the slang term 爷 as a personal pronoun in an impolite context). The 春 Chun can also refer to fa chun (发春), which is slang for sexual arousal – literally 'Spring has come'.

=== Ji Ba Mao ===
Ji Ba Mao (吉跋猫, Jí Bá Māo), literally 'Lucky Journey Cat' (a homophone with 鸡巴毛, referring to pubic hair, as the homophone jība (鸡巴) is a vulgar term for 'penis', while the definition of 毛 máo is 'hair' or 'fur'). The original article states that this cat lives in dark, damp environments and competes for food with the White Tiger (white tiger is a slang term for a hairless/shaved vulva). Additionally, the Ji Ba Mao is claimed to have flourished during the reign of the Zhengde Emperor.

=== Wei Shen Jing ===
Wei Shen Jing (尾申鲸, Wěi Shēn Jīng), literally 'Stretch-Tailed Whale' (a near-homophone with 卫生巾, wèishēngjīn, referring to menstrual pads). From the Baidu Baike article, it was first discovered by Zheng He during his maritime adventures. According to the article this creature was hunted for clothing material to manufacture women's lingerie.

=== Yin Dao Yan ===
Yin Dao Yan (吟稻雁, Yín Dào Yàn), literally 'Singing Rice Goose' (a homophone with 阴道炎 Yīn Dào Yán, meaning a vaginitis infection). From the article on Yin Dao Yan, in the Kangxi era, a large goose dived into a certain field, damaging it and causing the local farmers to come down with a strange sickness.

=== Da Fei Ji ===
Da Fei Ji (达菲鸡, Dá Fēi Jī), literally 'Intelligent Fragrant Chicken' (a homophone with 打飞机 Dǎ Fēi Jī, slang for masturbation while literally meaning 'hitting an airplane'). According to the original article, Da Fei Ji is a species of bird that likes exercise, and the males use neck spasms to spit out a white secretion to impress females during mating seasons.

=== Qian Lie Xie ===
Qian Lie Xie (潜烈蟹, Qián Liè Xiè), literally 'Hidden Fiery Crab', closely resembles qián liè xiàn (前列腺), which translates to 'prostate glands'. According to the article, this is a legendary crab that once stopped up the Grand Canal (referring to the urinary tract).

== Official reactions ==
The State Administration of Radio, Film, and Television issued a directive on 30 March 2009 to highlight 31 categories of content prohibited online, including violence, pornography, and content which may "incite ethnic discrimination or undermine social stability". According to reports, the instruction follows the official embarrassment over the rise of the "Grass Mud Horse" phenomenon.

== See also ==
- Chun Ge
- Internet censorship in the People's Republic of China
- Internet in China
- Internet meme
- Chinese Internet slang
- List of Internet phenomena in China
- Jia Junpeng
- Mandarin Chinese profanity
- River crab (Internet slang)
- Uncyclopedia
- Very erotic very violent
- Yax Lizard
