= Bawang Shampoo =

Chinese shampoo manufacturer

B&W International (Group) Holdings Limited 霸王国际(集团)控股有限公司
- Logo of Bawang Shampoo
- Type: Public
- Traded as: SEHK: 1338
- Industry: Shampoo
- Founded: 1989
- Founder: Mr. Chen Qiyuan
- Headquarters: Guangzhou, Guangdong, People's Republic of China
- Area served: People's Republic of China
- Key people: Chairman: Mr. Chen Qiyuan
- Products: Chinese herbal medicine shampoo
- Website: Official website of B&W International

B&W International (Group) Holdings Limited (Chinese: 霸王国际(集团)控股有限公司) (SEHK: 1338) is the fourth most popular shampoo manufacturer in China. Headquartered in Guangzhou, the company is engaged in the production of Chinese herbal medicine shampoo under the brand name Bawang (Chinese: 霸王). Jackie Chan, an international movie star, has been contracted to advertise Bawang Shampoo.

Its shares were listed on the Hong Kong Stock Exchange in 2009.

== See also ==
- Duang
