= No zuo no die =

Chinese Internet slang

No zuo no die (Chinese: 不作死就不会死 or 不作不死) is translated from a Chinese internet slang phrase that became popular in the 2010s and has also been turned into a Chinese internet meme.

The original wording of the Chinese phrase means "one would not be in trouble had one not asked for it". People use no zuo no die to describe a warning against a self-defeating behavior or to describe someone who did something stupid that directly led to a bad consequence.

== Etymology ==
不作死就不会死, its original Chinese phrase, has several theories about its origin. Some say this saying first came from a Japanese line in Gundam anime, in episode 12 of Mobile Suit Zeta Gundam. Kamille Bidan from List of Mobile Suit Zeta Gundam characters says "抵抗すると無駄死にするだけだって、何でわからないんだ!" And this saying was translated into Mandarin, simplified, and localized as 不作死就不会死.

According to linguist Victor Mair, no zuo no die is related to the word "作死" (zuo si) in Mandarin, which means seeking death or provoking trouble to kill oneself. In a 2014 research of Chinese Internet slang on Chinese TikTok Douyin, Li and Wang used no zuo no die as an example of new Chinglish idiom. They explained that this phrase is from the expression of Chinese phrase 不作死就不会死（bù zuò sǐ jiù bù huì sǐ). The English zuo and sie are conveying parts of the meaning from the original phrase.

== Popularity and cultural influence ==
It is half-translated to Chinglish where it retains one of its Chinese characters in pinyin. "zuo" (Chinese: 作; pinyin: zuō) is a Mandarin Chinese word meaning to "act silly or daring (for attention)". The original Chinese phrase has become very popular in China. When its Chinglish translation was included in Urban Dictionary in 2014, it generated a lot of interest in the media, interpreted by many Chinese as a sign of China's growing soft power.

== Linguistic form and Usage ==
The expression "no zuo no die" combines English words with the Mandarin Chinese pronunciation of the character zuo 作. In this expression no and die are English, representing 不 and 死, while zuo is written in the form of Pinyin. Linguistic researchers have discussed this phrase as an example of Chinese-English neologisms and language mixing. Xu and Tian (2017) have described this phrase as a transliteration.

In Li and Wang's study, they documented an example of the expression used in a Douyin video caption in May 2020.

And in a research in 2024, Zhong, Ang and Sharmini also documented this expression in a conversation between two mandarin speakers. One used "no zuo no die" in a humorous way after another described an uncomfortable feeling after applied fragrance to the lip. The research also classified the phrase as a Chinglish idiom, and talked about this as an example of Code-switching in mandarin conversations.

== See also ==
- Wiktionary:fuck around and find out
