= Very erotic very violent =

Chinese internet meme

Very erotic very violent (Chinese: 很黄很暴力; pinyin: hěn huáng hěn bàolì; Wade–Giles: hen huang hen pao-li; lit. 'very yellow very violent') is a Chinese internet meme that originated from a news report on China Central Television's flagship Xinwen Lianbo program, allegedly quoting a schoolgirl describing a web page. This incident was widely parodied on various internet forums.

This Chinese phrase, which combines the intensive adverb hen (很; "very; quite; much") with huang (黄; "yellow") (denoting 黃色; huángsè; "erotic; obscene; pornographic") and bàolì (暴力; "violence; force"), follows the form of very good very mighty, a snowclone for Internet slang popularized earlier that year.

== CCTV news report ==
On 27 December 2007, Xinwen Lianbo aired a report about the easy availability of explicit content on the internet. This report made an appeal to judicial institutions and the Chinese government to manage and filter the internet. In the report, a young student described a pop-up advertisement she saw as being "very erotic, [and] very violent".

Internet users then began to ridicule and parody the quote and question the program's credibility, believing that it would be unlikely for a person of that age to find a web page to be both erotic and violent at the same time. Personal information of the interviewed girl was also leaked, identifying her by name. Online message boards were populated by large threads about the incident, and a satirical work stated that CCTV's website was the number one "very erotic very violent" website on the internet, with some users even creating their own top lists of sites which meet these criteria, the "top 8 very erotic very violent sports events" and even identifying things that are yellow as being erotic (since 黄; huáng, the Mandarin character for "yellow", also means "erotic").

== Response ==
The general consensus is that the girl in the report would not have been able to access such a web page unintentionally. It is thought that the line was actually a form of distortion by the reporters and not actually the views expressed by the girl, trying to make the problem look more serious. Even though the internet is heavily filtered in China, the news report may have suggested that the current filters are not enough.

It was pointed out by some media, that the outcry from the community about this report showed a dissatisfaction with the content of the report, the censorship of the Internet in China, and a long-term dissatisfaction for the production practices of Xinwen Lianbo.

Some critics also emerged, expressing discontent about the Internet outcry and many parodies related to the report, some using her real name, as stated by a letter written by an individual claiming to be the girl's father.

Most Chinese media intentionally ignored the role CCTV played in the report, focusing more on the violation of the girl's privacy. Wang Xiaofeng, chief writer of cultural department Lifeweek, claimed that CCTV and the users lack required conviction for protecting minors. Claims followed that "what the girl really needs is benevolent critique from the adults other than fleer [mockery] from entertainers".

== See also ==
- List of Internet phenomena
- Internet in China
- Jia Junpeng
- Baidu 10 Mythical Creatures
- Internet censorship in the People's Republic of China
