= Internet in China =

The People's Republic of China has been on the Internet intermittently since May 1989 and on a permanent basis since 20 April 1994. Since 2008, China has become the country with the largest population on the Internet (and remains so as of 2025). As of December 2024, 1.09 billion people in China (77.5% of the country's total population) use the internet.

China's first foray into the global cyberspace was an email (not TCP/IP based and thus technically not internet) sent on 20 September 1987 to the Karlsruhe Institute of Technology, reading, "Across the Great Wall, towards the rest of the world" (Chinese: 越过长城，走向世界; pinyin: Yuèguò chángchéng, zǒuxiàng shìjiè). This later became a well-known phrase in China and as of 2018, was displayed on the desktop login screen for QQ mail.

By law, the Chinese Communist Party (CCP) governs the country's Internet. China's Internet is heavily censored by the CCP, with numerous foreign websites blocked by the Great Firewall. China has one of the lowest cross-border internet traffic rates in the world. The usage of foreign apps and websites is extremely low, with most Chinese netizens using domestic alternatives. The Cyberspace Administration of China, an institution directly under the CCP Central Committee, is the national internet regulator and censor. China requires a real-name system for Internet services and online platforms.

== History ==
Internet penetration rates in China in the context of East Asia and Southeast Asia, 1995–2012

From 1995 to 2004, internet use in China was almost entirely in urban areas. By 2003, less than 0.2% of rural people had used the internet. In 2004, the Ministry of Industry and Information Technology began the Connecting Every Village Project which promoted the use of telecommunications and internet in rural China. Beginning in late 2009, the program began building rural telecenters each of which had at least one telephone, computer, and internet connectivity. Approximately 90,000 rural telecenters were built by 2011. By 2011, 89% of administrative villages had internet access.

China replaced the U.S. in its global leadership in terms of installed telecommunication bandwidth in 2011. By 2014, China hosts more than twice as much national bandwidth potential than the U.S., the historical leader in terms of installed telecommunication bandwidth (China: 29% versus US: 13% of the global total).

China began implementing a National Broadband Strategy in 2013. The program aimed to increase the speed, quality, and adoption of broadband and 4G networks. As of 2018, 96% of administrative villages had fiber optic networks and 95% had 4G networks.

Wireless, especially internet access through a mobile phone, has developed rapidly. The affordability of mobile phones and internet data in China has resulted in the number of mobile internet users in China surpassing the number of computer internet users. 500 million were accessing the internet via cell phones in 2013. The number of dial-up users peaked in 2004 and since then has decreased sharply. Generally statistics on the number of mobile internet users in China show a significant slump in the growth rate between 2008 and 2010, with a small peak in the next two years.

In 2015, the State Council promoted the Internet Plus initiative, a five-year plan to integrate traditional manufacturing and service industries with big data, cloud computing, and Internet of things technology. The State Council provided support for Internet Plus through policy support in area including cross-border e-commerce and rural e-commerce. Various regulatory bodies promoted Internet Plus within their sectors.

In April 2020, the National Development and Reform Commission (NDRC) proposed that "satellite internet" should be a part of new national infrastructure. By the next month, Shanghai, Beijing, Fuzhou, Chongqing, Chengdu, and Shenzhen had each proposed regional action plans to support the new satellite internet constellation project with a goal to provide domestic China satellite internet to rural areas. Beginning in 2019, US (SpaceX Starlink) and UK (OneWeb, 2020) private companies had begun fielding large internet satellite constellations with global coverage; however China does not intend to license non-Chinese technical solutions for satellite broadband within the jurisdiction of Chinese law.

== Structure ==
An important characteristic of the Chinese internet is that online access routes are owned by the Chinese government, and private enterprises and individuals can only rent bandwidth from the state. The first four major national networks, namely CSTNET, ChinaNet, CERNET and CHINAGBN, are the "backbone" of the mainland Chinese internet. Later dominant telecom providers also started to provide internet services. China Telecom, China Unicom, and China Mobile control operate the internet exchange points through which incoming traffic must pass.

In January 2015, China added seven new access points to the world's internet backbone, adding to the three points that connect through Beijing, Shanghai, and Guangzhou.

As of 2023, the internet in China is characterized by uneven development, with the adoption rate and availability of the internet varying by region and population groups.

== Userbase ==
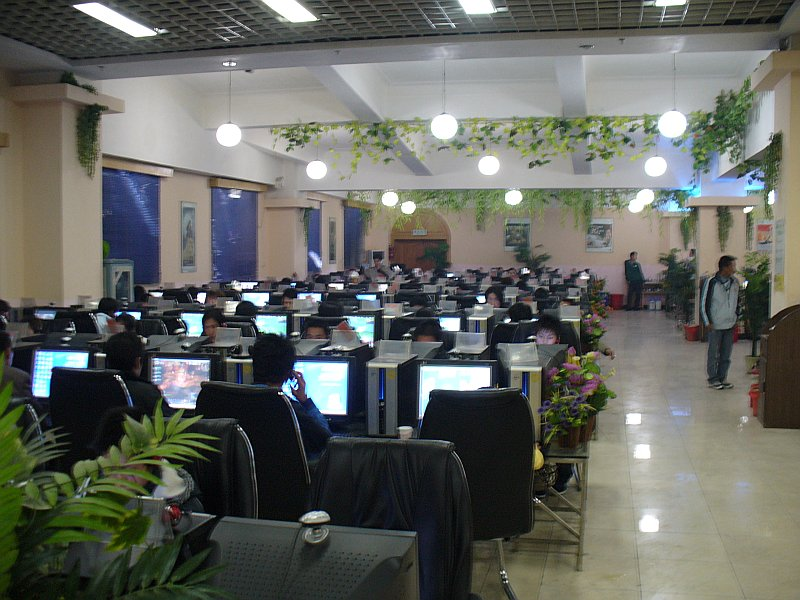
Internet café in Lijiang City

English-language media in China often use the word netizen particularly to refer to Chinese internet users.

=== Size ===
China has the largest number of internet users of any country with 1.1 billion as of August 2024. Consistent with the trends of other large and relatively linguistically isolated countries, Chinese internet users tend to focus their internet use on content that is domestically relevant.

As of 2025, 20% of internet users around the world are Chinese.

=== Demographics ===
In the early years of China's internet, the userbase primarily consisted of young males of the elite or middle class, with higher educational and working in professional fields, located in the most developed regions and biggest cities. Over time, the demographics of Chinese internet users has developed closer to the demographics of the country as a whole. Mobile internet access has increased the participation of females, younger people, less educated people, and people from rural areas.

According to a survey by the China Internet Network Information Center (CNNIC), China had 1.09 billion Internet users by the end of December 2023, a 1.9% increase over the year before and a penetration rate of 77.5%. The proportions of users accessing the Internet via mobile phones, desktop computers, laptop computers, TVs and tablet computers were 99.9%, 33.9%, 30.3%, 22.5% and 26.6%, respectively. 51.2% of internet users were male, while the remaining 48.8% were female.

Throughout the history of the internet in China, the majority of users have been between ages 20 and 50.

== Law and regulation ==
By law, the Chinese Communist Party (CCP) governs the country's Internet. The Cyberspace Administration of China (CAC), an institution directly under the CCP Central Committee, is the primary body for content and data regulation, and serves to translate CCP ideology and policy into technical specifications. It coordinates data regulation enforcement among relevant ministries, including the Ministry of Industry and Information Technology (MIIT) and the State Administration for Market Regulation. The Ministry of Public Security (MPS) has the primary responsibility for preventing cyberattacks.

The legal framework for China's internet regulations is established by the Cyber Security Law, the Data Security Law, and the Personal Information Protection Law. This framework is further developed through regulations and administrative actions.

Chinese policymakers frame data as a "key" factor of production, comparable to land, labor, capital, and technology, thereby requiring an increased level of state control.

=== Regulatory priorities ===
In 2009, China amended its Criminal Law to create a low threshold for the prosecution of malicious cybercrimes and illegal data sales.

Generally, China advocates for internet sovereignty and tends to prioritize cybersecurity more than personal data protection. Chinese policymakers became increasingly concerned about the risk of cyberattacks following the 2010s global surveillance disclosures by Edward Snowden, which demonstrated extensive United States intelligence activities in China. As part of its response, the Communist Party in 2014 formed the Cybersecurity and Information Leading Group.

Since 2014, China expresses its key principles on cyberspace sovereignty and related topics in the National Cybersecurity Strategy and Strategy for International Cooperation in Cyberspace. It also discusses principles for developing a "community of common destiny in cyberspace."

The 2017 Cyber Security Law was also part of China's response to increased risks of foreign surveillance and foreign data collection following the United States surveillance disclosures. Among other provisions, the law has significant data localization requirements. It is a major pillar of the Chinese data regulatory environment.

Before the 2020-2021 Xi Jinping administration reform spree, the regulatory environment for internet companies was relatively lax because the government sought to encourage the development of the big data economy. The regulatory environment for tech companies subsequently became stricter and in 2021, two national data laws and a host of regulatory guidelines were promulgated, broadening the scope of government enforcement and increasing the penalties for personal data violations. After mid-2023, the government decreased its regulatory intervention in e-commerce and issued policies more supportive of the e-commerce sector.

In 2020, the Xiao Zhan/227 incident, a conflict among online fan communities arising from a slash fiction novel posted on the fan fiction website Archive of Our Own, resulted in public attention and scrutiny from policymakers on the issue of hostile online communication. The Cyberspace Administration of China's Qinglang Xingdong ("Sweep-Up Campaign") began in June 2021 and sought to clean up harmful actions in fandoms such as fan wars. CAC initiated a series of policies and campaigns against "resentment and abuse, upvoting/downvoting and trolling, disinformation and name-calling, doxing, and privacy violations of online fandom communities." Major Chinese social media platforms revised their policies accordingly.

The 2021 Data Security Law classifies data into different categories and establishes corresponding levels of protection. It imposes significant data localization requirements, in a response to the extraterritorial reach of the United States CLOUD Act or similar foreign laws. The 2021 Personal Information Protection Law is China's first comprehensive law on personal data rights and is modeled after the European Union's General Data Protection Regulation. In summer 2021, MIIT began a six-month long regulatory campaign to address a variety of consumer protection and unfair competition issues, including interoperability concerns, in the consumer internet sector. It held meetings with executives from major Chinese tech companies and instructed them that their companies could no longer block external links to competitors.

Regarding regulation of the internet, the Resolution on the Major Achievements and Historical Experience of the Party over the Past Century states:

The Party puts heavy emphasis on developing and creating new means of communication. It has [promoted integrated development of media, and worked to strengthen the penetration and credibility of media and its ability to guide and influence. The Central Committee has made it clear that failure in the cyberspace domain will spell disaster for the Party's long-term governance. The Party therefore attaches great importance to the Internet as the main arena, battleground, and frontline of the ideological struggle. It has improved the leadership and management systems for the Internet, regulated the cyberspace according to the law, and strived to foster a clean online environment.

In 2022, the CAC issued measures and guidelines on security assessments for cross-border data transfers as part of an effort to institutionalize data transfer review mechanisms. In March 2022, China instituted its Regulations of Internet Information Service Recommendation Algorithms. Among other provisions, these regulations mandate the registration of algorithms with "public opinion properties" or "capacity for social mobilization". The companies that develop such algorithms must carry out security assessments. Since 2023, all apps provided in app stores require pre-approval from the Ministry of Industry and Information Technology.

In March 2024, China's Provisions on Promoting and Regulating Cross-Border Data Flows, which CAC had issued, became effective. These provisions aim to integrate obligations across the Cyber Security Law, the Data Security Law, and the Personal Information Protection Law. Among other measures, it in certain circumstances it requires a CAC-led review of data exports across China's borders.

=== Real-name system ===
On 28 December 2012, the Standing Committee of the National People's Congress (NPCSC) adopted the Decision on Strengthening Network Information Protection, requiring service providers to require users to provide identity information when they obtain or use services including phone services, Internet access, and posting on social media. This marked the start of the Internet real-name system in China, in which Internet service providers and online platforms (especially user-generated content sites) are required to collect users' real names, ID numbers, and other information when providing services.

In 2015, the Cyberspace Administration of China announced a Provision requiring users to sign up with their real name on internet services. The real-name system was codified in the Cybersecurity Law in 2016. Starting from 2016, use of cell phone numbers in mainland China have been required to be registered with real names. In 2017, the Cyberspace Administration of China announced regulations requiring online platforms to request and verify real names and other personal information from users when they register, leading China's largest apps to start implementing the system. In 2025, China launched the national online identity authentication system, allowing netizens to submit their personal information to receive an "Internet certificate", a unique code that can be used to verify real-name identities and access online accounts.

=== Regulations regarding minors ===
As a result of public outcry over parent-child online gaming conflicts, the government issued legislation in the early 2000s. In 2002, the government passed legislation which forbid Internet cafes from allowing minors. The Law on Protection of Minors was amended in 2006 to state that the family and the state should guide minors' online behavior. These amendments place "indulgence in the Internet" on par with misbehaviors like smoking and vagrancy.

In 2009, the government requested that to aid parents in monitoring what children were doing on the Internet, "Green Dam Youth Escort" software be pre-installed on personal computers sold in most parts of China (excluding special administrative regions). This resulted in public criticism on the basis of privacy concerns, and the government abandoned the effort after several months.

The state requires online games to set limits for minors' playing time.

== Content ==
According to Kaiser Kuo, the internet in China is largely used for entertainment purposes, being referred to as the "entertainment superhighway". However, it also serves as the first public forum for Chinese citizens to freely exchange their ideas. Most users go online to read news, to search for information, and to check their email. They also go to BBS or web forums, find music or videos, or download files.

The Great Firewall means that China has one of the lowest cross-border internet traffic rates in the world. Overwhelming majority of the traffic in the Chinese Internet remains domestic, with traffic headed out to or in from a foreign country remaining at single low digits.

=== Messaging ===
As of 2023, the most used internet services in China are instant messaging and mobile messaging apps. In 2020, 99% of internet users in China used instant messaging, while 99.8% used mobile messaging apps.

As of 2019, 93.5% of Chinese internet users had used WeChat. As of 2026, it continues to be one of the main platforms in China.

=== Websites ===
All websites that operate in China with their own domain name must have an ICP license from the Ministry of Industry and Information Technology. Because the PRC government blocks many foreign websites, many homegrown copycats of foreign websites have appeared.

=== Search engines ===
Top ten most popular search sites in China As of 17 September 2013 By Unique visitors aged 15+, excludes traffic from public computers such as internet cafes or mobile phones Source: comScore qSearch
China	Share of searches (%)
Baidu	63.16
360	18.23
Sogou	10.35
Soso	3.62
Google	2.88
Bing	0.57
Yahoo	0.48
Youdao	0.16
other	0.09

Baidu is the leading search engine in China, while most web portals also provide search opportunities like Bing and Sogou.

Efforts to establish state-owned search engines in China have not succeeded. Search engine ChinaSo.com, jointly managed by Xinhua News Agency and People's Daily, is active as of 2024 but has few users. State-run search engine Jike Search, the CEO of which was Deng Yaping, failed in 2013.

=== Social media ===
Bulletin board system (BBS) forums began developing in China in 1994.

Since 2009, microblogs (weibo) have become one of the most widely used internet services in China. As of December 2024, Sina Weibo is the most used social media platform. Other major social media platforms as of 2026 include, among others, Bilibili, Douyin, Douban, and Xiaohongshu.

China is one of the most restricted countries in the world in terms of internet; however, these constraints have directly contributed to the success of local Chinese social media sites.

In Chinese internet discourse, "self-media" refers to independently operated social media accounts that produce original content and are not registered with an official media agency.

Since the 2010s, social media has become a major factor in public opinion, political discourse, and popular expression. Academic He Li writes, "It has revolutionized popular expression in China, enabling users to organize, protests, and influence public opinion in unprecedented ways."

=== Online shopping ===
Since 2013, China is the world's largest e-commerce market. Its domestic e-commerce market was an estimated US$899 billion in 2016. China accounted for 42.4% of worldwide retail e-commerce in that year, the most of any country.In 2019, online retail sales were 21% of China's total retail sales. As of late 2022, approximately 850 million Chinese individuals shop online and sectors related to e-commerce employ 69 million people in the country. In 2023, nearly 50% of worldwide online sales took place from China. In 2024 Alibaba's e-commerce platforms accounted for 36.4 percent of China's e-commerce market, a slight decrease from the previous year. In November 2025, Alibaba's profit halved in its fiscal second quarter due to competition in the food-delivery sector, but revenue growth remained steady as its artificial intelligence initiatives gained momentum, with a specific emphasis on the consumer AI space, which is one of the largest. The drop was 53% year on year to 20.99 billion yuan, while adjusted net profit dropped by about 72% to 10.35 billion yuan, which was below expectations. This slump is mostly due to intense competition and heavy spending in the food-delivery sector. Alibaba's food delivery applications include Ele.me, which introduced many discounts to gain customers.

Some local governments have created e-commerce platforms in an effort to facilitate sales of local products. With the exception of the business-to-business platform Yiwugo.com (created by the Yiwu city government and a state-owned enterprise), these platforms have not been commercially successful.

=== Online mapping services ===
China has endeavored to offer a number of online mapping services and allows the dissemination of geographic information within the country. Tencent Maps (腾讯地图), Baidu Maps (百度地圖) and Tianditu (天地圖) are typical examples. Online mapping services can be understood as online cartography backed up by a geographic information system (GIS). GIS was originally a tool for cartographers, geographers and other types of specialists to store, manage, present and analyze spatial data. In bringing GIS online, the Web has made these tools available to a much wider audience. Furthermore, with the advent of broadband, utilizing GIS has become much faster and easier. Increasingly, non-specialist members of the public can access, look up and make use of geographic information for their own purposes. Tianditu is China's first online mapping service. Literally World Map, Tianditu was launched in late October 2010. The Chinese government has repeatedly claimed that this service is to offer comprehensive geographical data for Chinese users to learn more about the world.

=== Online payment ===
In 2013, Alipay overtook PayPal to become the world's largest mobile payment provider. As of January 2015, Alipay, owned by Alibaba Group has 600 million counts of users and has the largest user group among all online-payment providers. It continues to be China's largest online payment service as of at least 2023. WeChat Pay remains a strong competitor to Alipay, with 37% of the Chinese mobile payment market as of 2016. The latest figures from 2020 showed that Alipay had 711 million monthly active users, despite trade restrictions between the U.S. and China. Chinese buyers rely on it for daily payments, bill settlements, restaurant orders, and appointments. The application also offers loans, insurance, and lifestyle services, and, in a way, because of Trump's restrictions, it is being used more by the local Chinese populace, creating a self-reliant digital ecosystem. From ordering food to making online purchases on e-commerce sites like Alibaba and booking doctor appointments and even using public toilets; around 90% of payments are being made through mobile applications. On January 5, 2021, Trump considered banning Alipay and seven other Chinese applications, WeChat, QQ, Wallet, CamScanner, SHAREit, VMate, and WPS Office, citing national security threats. By June 2024, about 954 million individuals were actively using mobile payment in China.

=== Online gaming ===
As of 2022, China is the second largest market for online games after the United States. In 2023, the country has 668 million internet users playing online games and the industry was worth US$42 billion. 53.8% of gamers are male, 46.2% are female.

In 2007, the Ministry of Culture (MoC) and General Administration of Press and Publication (GAPP) along with several other agencies implemented the Online Game Anti-Addiction System which aimed to stop video game addiction in youth. This system restricted minors from playing more than 3 hours a day and required Identification (ID) checking in order to verify you are of age.

Later in 2019, the Chinese government announced in November that gamers under the age of 18 would be banned from playing video games between the hours of 10 p.m. and 8 a.m. In addition, gamers under 18 would be restricted to 90 minutes of playing during the weekdays and 3 hours of playing during weekends and holidays as per new guidelines.

As of 2021, the National Press and Publication Administration (NPPA) further restricted rules limiting playtime for under-18s to one hour per day from 8p.m. to 9 p.m. and only on Fridays, Saturdays, and Sundays.

=== Online literature ===
Chinese online literature, also known as Chinese internet literature or Chinese web literature, refers to works of literature written in the Chinese language that are published and read directly on the internet. Originating in the 1980s, it has seen increasing development in the 21st century with the increase of mobile reading throughout the world, especially as the internet has become more accessible. Most Chinese internet literature has made use of the popularity of scrolling platforms and literature tends to be published in a serialized format, with this literature being known as webnovels or light novels.

=== Censorship ===
The Golden Shield Project was proposed to the State Council by Premier Zhu Rongji in 1993. It is overseen by the Ministry of Public Security. As a massive surveillance and content control system, it was launched in November 2000, and became known as the Great Firewall. The governmental authorities not only block website content but also monitor the Internet access of individuals.

However, there are some methods of circumventing the censorship by using proxy servers outside the firewall. Users may circumvent all of the censorship and monitoring of the Great Firewall if they have a secure VPN or SSH connection method to a computer outside mainland China.

In 2017, the Chinese government declared unauthorized VPN services illegal, requiring VPN providers to obtain state approval. State-owned enterprises or state institutions use VPNs for official work. The Chinese government has authorized several official VPN providers. Those who develop or sell their own VPNs potentially face years in prison. According to 2022 estimate by Asia Society, 3% of Chinese netizens use VPNs, compared to 8.5% of Americans. Similarly, based on its estimates of leaked government documents, Asia Society estimated in 2026 that VPN usage in China was in the low single digits. It also estimated that foreign apps blocked by the Great Firewall have extremely low traffic, particularly compared to domestic apps; the top five domestic apps saw traffic that was 1,000 times more than the top five foreign apps. It concluded that only a tiny subset of the population tried to use banned foreign apps, and an even smaller percentage was successful in connecting to those apps, with most being unsuccessful.

For their use in "wall climbing" the Great Firewall, VPNs are sometimes colloquially referred to as "the ladder".

Different methods are used to block certain websites or pages including DNS poisoning, blocking access to IPs, analyzing and filtering URLs, inspecting filter packets and resetting connections.

In 2009, motivated in part by its desire to prevent color revolutions, China banned Facebook, YouTube, and Twitter. It banned Google the next year. By blocking major international internet platforms such as Google, Facebook, YouTube, and Twitter, the Great Firewall has contributed to the development of domestic alternatives including Baidu, Renren, Youku, and Weibo.

=== Memes ===
The Doge meme developed popularity on Chinese social media platforms beginning in 2013. In Sinophone online contexts, the dog's expression is often viewed as enigmatic. Weibo implemented the meme as an emoji, which further increased the meme's popularity, and which is often used to indicate whimsy or ambiguous sarcasm.

Other global visual elements of online discourse that have become localised in Chinese contexts include D'Angelo Dinero memes (the wrestler's nuanced facial expressions are used to comment on issues) and Baozou comics (influenced by Anglophone rage comics).

==== Political memes ====
Internet regulation and political taboos in China result in an online political satire culture which tends to be more indirect and which spoofs establishment discourses. The Baidu 10 Mythical Creatures, initially a humorous hoax, became a popular and widespread internet meme in China. These ten hoaxes reportedly originated in response to increasing online censorship and have become an icon of Chinese internet users' resistance to it.

Green Dam Girl, a satirical character, is among the Chinese memes that draws on visual elements of Japanese popular culture such as moe culture. Green Dam Girl satirised the Green Dam Youth Escort software.

The State Administration of Press, Publication, Radio, Film and Television issued a directive on 30 March 2009 to highlight 31 categories of content prohibited online, including violence, pornography and content which may "incite ethnic discrimination or undermine social stability". Many Chinese internet users believe the instruction follows the official embarrassment over the "Grass Mud Horse" and the "River Crab". Industry observers believe that the move was designed to stop the spread of parodies or other comments on politically sensitive issues in the runup to the anniversary of the 1989 Tiananmen Square protests and massacre.

The meme "Shut up, we're discussing democracy and you do not have a say" is used in online political discourses to mock liberal democratic public intellectuals, contending that they are self-interested, ideologically intolerant, and thus hypocritical.

== Internet advertising market ==
The size of China's online advertising market was RMB 3.3 billion in the third quarter 2008, up 19.1% compared with the previous quarter. Tencent, Baidu.com Inc, and Sina Corp remain the top 3 in terms of market share. Keyword advertising market size reached RMB 1.46 billion, accounting for 43.8% of the total Internet advertising market with a quarter-on-quarter growth rate of 19.3%, while that of the online advertising site amounted to RMB 1.70 billion, accounting for 50.7% of the total, up 18.9% compared with the second quarter.

== See also ==
- China Internet Project
- E-commerce in China
- Golden projects
- Great Cannon
- Human flesh search engine (HFSE)
- List of Internet phenomena in China
- List of Internet slang in China
- Media of China
- Telecommunications in China
  - Telecommunications industry in China
