= Duang =

Chinese neologism and internet meme

A representation of the character duang, derived from the characters for cheng and long

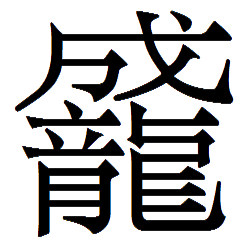
"" traditional form

"" simplified form

Duang (Mandarin pronunciation: [twáŋ] (Note: While the meme is usually pronounced [twáŋ], the actual noise Jackie Chan made is better represented as a narrow phonetic transcription by [tʊ̀ŋɛɫ])); pinyin: duāng; Zhuyin Fuhao: ㄉㄨㄤ; written as 動L in Hong Kong Cantonese with Jyutping dung6 eu6) is a Chinese neologism that has become a viral meme despite its meaning being unclear. It has become a popular hashtag on Sina Weibo with more than 8 million mentions by the start of March 2015.

== History ==
The word became viral after a 2004 advertisement for Bawang Shampoo in which Jackie Chan says, "...after filming, visual effects are added, the hair becomes duang very black, very shiny and very smooth." The advertisement was the subject of a parody published on 20 February 2015 on the Chinese video sharing site Bilibili, featuring footage of Chan remixed to the tune of the viral Chinese song My Skate Shoes (我的滑板鞋). In the video, Chan appears to say that he has no hair at all, with more interjections of "duang": "after a month of special effects, hair is – dua-a-a-ng – still I knew they're fake, that it's due to chemicals. Every day now, I'm adding special effects... added a lot of effects... hair – duang duang duang – is thick and shiny." The parody alludes to a 2010 scandal in which Bawang was accused of having added carcinogenic chemicals to its hair products.

Jackie Chan acknowledged the parody by uploading a self-mocking microblog that imitated the sentence structure from the spoof advertisement. He also expressed his gratitude for the public's attention and his determination to create more movies for his fans in the future. His optimistic personality and self-mockery won over many fans.

== Meaning ==
Despite its widespread appearance, the meaning of duang is unclear; "What's the meaning of duang" became the main topic on Weibo. Although there seems to be no meaning at all, many people still continue to use it in their everyday conversations. The BBC has suggested that the word is an example of onomatopoeia, a word phonetically imitating a sound. While Chan used it as a "cartoonish sound-effect", as Ad Age puts it, some have used it in the same spirit while others have adopted it as an intensifier; for instance, something might be "duang cute" or one could be "very duang confused". Based on the words spoken by Chan in the shampoo advertisement, duang has been defined as meaning "add special effects" (Chinese: 加特效; pinyin: jiā tèxiào) in some Chinese sources.

The meme has been picked up by a variety of advertisers, including Bawang itself, which has released its own spoof video, in addition to KFC, PepsiCo, China Eastern Airlines and Taobao. Durex issued an animated GIF showing a buzzing rabbit vibrator with "duang" as the caption. The meme's lack of any defined meaning has enabled advertisers and Internet users to create their own version of "duang" and define it as they wish. Foreign Policy noted that while Chinese Internet users had a tradition of inventing new words or slang to get around government censorship, the Chinese government had lately managed to push back against this practice; it was thus perhaps "inevitable that a new word would emerge that simply meant nothing at all."

== Pronunciation ==
The word duang is not a meaningful syllable in Standard Chinese, and thus lacks any official associated character. However, as both the onset d- and the rime -uang are both legal elements that occur in other syllables, the word is a phonologically valid syllable in Mandarin. Since it lacks an associated character, though, it can only be written by using bopomofo or pinyin or the unofficial character built from Jackie Chan's name. Although the word was initially written without any indication of tone, it was later given a first tone reading as (pinyin) duāng.

== Chinese character ==
The characters for "duang": (simplified Chinese: ; traditional Chinese: ; pinyin: duāng) do not exist in any Chinese dictionary and are not encoded in Unicode. They were created from the two characters used for Jackie Chan's Chinese stage name, Cheng Long (simplified Chinese: 成龙; traditional Chinese: 成龍; pinyin: Chéng Lóng, meaning "become a dragon"), stacked on top of each other.

== In music ==
The string quartet 'Duang' by composer Samuel Cho premiered in May 2018 is inspired by this word.
