= Sister Feng =

Chinese internet celebrity and meme

- 罗玉凤
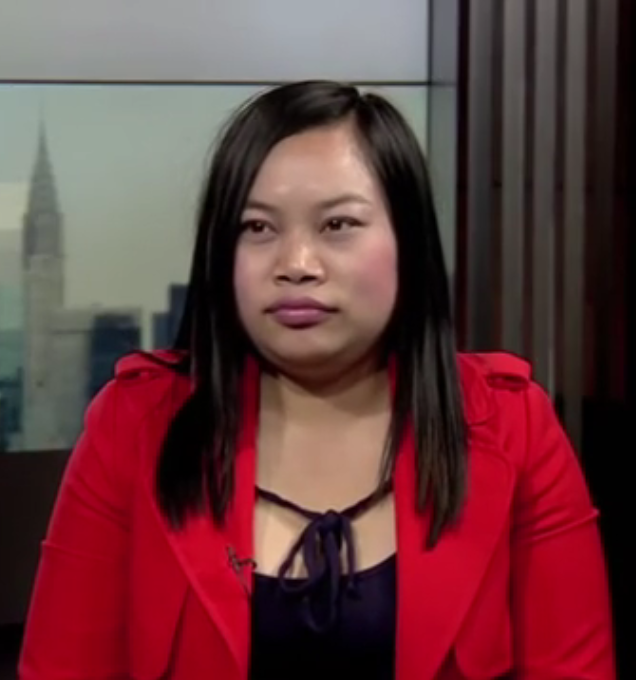
- Luo Yufeng at Voice of America interview, 2016
- Born: Luo Yufeng; September 23, 1985 (age 41); People's Republic of China
- Occupation: Internet celebrity

Luo Yufeng (born September 23, 1985) (simplified Chinese: 罗玉凤; traditional Chinese: 羅玉鳳; pinyin: Luó Yùfèng), better known as Sister Feng (凤姐, meaning "Sister Phoenix"), is a Chinese internet celebrity.

Luo became an internet celebrity and bully meme in China in late 2009. In 2015, she ranked 14th in the list of Chinese Internet celebrities.

== Early life and education ==
She was born into a farming family in Southwest China in 1985. In 2022, she was admitted into Queens College, City University of New York.

== Career ==
Luo first gained attention in November 2009, after passing out flyers in Shanghai seeking a marriageable boyfriend who was required to meet excessive qualifications. For example, she specified that such boyfriend "must be an elite with a degree in economics or similar from Peking University or Tsinghua University" and "must also be 176 to 183 centimeters tall and good looking." At that time, she was working as a cashier at a Carrefour in Shanghai, though she claimed she "works for a Fortune 500 company" (Carrefour ranked 25th on the 2009 Fortune Global 500 list).

Luo's penchant for outrageous comments continued to bring her attention. For example, she "called herself the brightest human being in the past three centuries, and added that she would remain the smartest person for the next 300 years."

In January 2010, Luo appeared on the popular television talk show Renjian with her "boyfriend" and "ex-boyfriend" about their "love triangle," though both were later confirmed to be actors, and the coverage of her increased with that exposure.

She is considered one of the biggest internet famous people to emerge in People's Republic of China in 2009, and has been widely covered by Chinese media. An announcement that she would get plastic surgery in March 2010 resulted in photoshopped pictures of her appearing on Baidu. In May 2010, she appeared on China's Got Talent, and was pelted with eggs.

In 2010, Luo relocated to New York City where she worked as a manicurist for four years. She was profiled in the New York Post. It has been reported that she has more than 4.7 million followers on Sina Weibo.

In 2012, she visited Harvard University to distribute flyers.

In 2019, she made a post criticising Huawei after it had been put on a trade blacklist by the US.
