= Chinese internet slang =

Chinese internet slang (Chinese: 中国网络用语; pinyin: zhōngguó wǎngluò yòngyǔ) refers to various kinds of internet slang used by people on the Chinese internet.

The categories given below are not exclusive and are used distinguish the different kinds of Chinese internet slang. Some phrases may belong in more than one category.

== Numeronyms ==
- 114514 – Borrowed from a Japanese homophonic shorthand for a line (いいよ，こいよ "sure, come on") in A Midsummer Night's Lewd Dream. Considered a humorous reference to the said gay porn in China, Japan, and Taiwan among anime-adjacent circles. A Chinese homophone is 逸一时，误一世, "a moment of leisure can lead to a lifetime of loss", generally used to "explain" the number in a more sanitized way. Also derived from the same work are: 1919, 810.
- 520 – "I love you". 520 (pinyin: wǔ'èrlíng) represents 我爱你; wǒ ài nǐ.
- 996 – The 996 working hour system (pinyin: jiǔjiǔliù)

== Latin abbreviations ==
Chinese users commonly use a pinyin-enabled QWERTY keyboard. Upper-case letters are easy to type and require no transformation. (Lower-case letters spell words which are changed into Chinese characters). Latin alphabet abbreviations (rather than Chinese characters) are also sometimes used to evade censorship.

- BZ – bǎnzhǔ (版主), the moderator of an internet discussion forum
- BS – bǐshì (鄙视), to despise (verb)
- JB – jiba (鸡巴), vulgar word referring to a man's private parts (male genitalia)
- CCAV – China Central Adult Video, ironic nickname for China Central Television (CCTV)
- CD – Cross-dressing
- CN – chǔnǚ (处女) or chǔnán (处男), virgin (female or male)
- FL – fàláng (发廊), hairdresser, possibly providing sex services
- FQ – fènqīng (愤青), indignant/angry youth
- GC – gāocháo (高潮), orgasm
- GCD – gòngchǎndǎng (共产党), the Chinese Communist Party
- GG – gēge (哥哥), literally older brother, by extension male friend, or guy. Nowadays, people say "GG" to mean good job on the game (these two letters also mean "Good Game").
- HLL – huá lì lì (华丽丽), glamorous, high-profile
- JC – jǐngchá (警察), police
- JP – jípǐn (极品), high quality, but used ironically for things that are extremely low quality
- JY – jīngyīng (精英), elite, right-wing intellectuals, but also jīngyè (精液; "sperm, semen")
- KJ – kǒujiāo (口交), oral sex
- LD – lǐng dǎo (领导), leadership, i.e. the government and officials
- ML – to make love
- MM – mèimèi (妹妹, 美美, 美妹 or 美眉), little sister, young girl, pretty girl. Often written as "MM", which usually refers to a young girl or pretty girls
- NB – niúbī (牛逼), an awesome, formidably impressive person, similar to "badass"
- NMSL – nǐmāsǐle (你妈死了), lit. "Your mom is dead", used as an insult
- PG – pìgu (屁股), buttocks
- P民 – pì mín (屁民), rabble, hoi polloi, ordinary people, often used ironically
- PS or P出 – Photoshopped (picture)
- SB – shǎbī (傻逼), lit. "dumb cunt", commonly used as an insult
- SN – sauna, reinforced by its Chinese translation sāngná (桑拿)
- TMD – tāmāde (他妈的), common Chinese expletive used for "damn", "fuck", and the like
- TT – tàotao (套套), condom
- WDR – wàidìrén (外地人), stranger, outsider, foreigner
- XJ – xiǎojiě (小姐), young woman, but also commonly for prostitute
- XXN - xiăo xiān nǚ (小仙女), "little fairies", means "pretty girl" or "young girl"
- XP – xìngpì (性癖), aesthetics or orientation of appearance
- YD – yín dàng (淫荡), obscene, perverted
- YY – yì yín (意淫), fantasizing, sexual thoughts
- ZF – zhèngfǔ (政府), government
- ZG – zhōngguó (中国), China

== Chinese characters abbreviations ==
- Life is so hard that some lies are better not exposed (人艰不拆; rénjiānbùchāi) – This comes from the lyrics of a song entitled "Shuo Huang" (Lies), by Taiwanese singer Yoga Lin. The phrase implies a situation that is too harsh to be contemplated. For example, it can be used to describe a large group of unemployed recent college graduates. This slang reflects that some people, especially young people in China, are disappointed by reality. The phrase is often paired with "too tired to love" (see below).
- Short, ugly and poor (矮丑穷; ǎichǒuqióng or 矮丑矬; ǎichǒucuó) – The opposite of gāofùshuài below, the least ideal.
- Tall, rich and handsome (高富帅; gāofùshuài) – This is the opposite of "ǎichǒuqióng" or "diaosi". Used to describe men with great wealth, a perfect body, as well as high qualifications and social status—ideal characteristics in mainland China. The word comes from an animated TV series, Tall, Rich and Handsome, in which the protagonist's name was "Tall, Rich and Handsome". This slang has become widely used on the internet, symbolizing the perfect man that many women in China dream of marrying.
- Too tired to love (累觉不爱; lèijuébùài) – This slang phrase is a literal abbreviation of the Chinese phrase "too tired to fall in love anymore." It originated from an article on the Douban website posted by a 13-year-old boy who grumbled about his single status and expressed his weariness and frustration towards romantic love. The article went viral, and the phrase was subsequently used as a sarcastic way to convey depression when encountering misfortunes or setbacks in life.
- White complexion, rich, and beautiful (白富美; báifùměi) – Female equivalent of gāofùshuài. The ideal girlfriend or wife.
- Get rid of single status (脱单; tuōdān or 脫魯; tuōlǔ in Taiwan) – No longer single, as if changing relationship status on social media. In Taiwan, tuōlǔ means no longer a loser (魯蛇; lǔshé) the Taiwanese equivalent of ǎichǒucuó as relationship status is one of the success indicators.
- Go to surf (去浪; qùlàng) – To hang out.

== Neologisms ==
- 50 Cent Party (五毛党; wǔmáo dǎng) – Internet users paid by the government or the Chinese Communist Party (CCP) to post comments. Patriotic users sometimes describe themselves as "voluntary fifty cent army" (ziganwu, meaning the fifty-cent army that brings its own rations).
- High-level black (高级黑 gaoji hei) - Online content superficially flattering to the CCP, the state, or official positions, but which in fact is made deliberately illogical or distasteful in order to mock the party or the government.
- Low-level red (低级红 diji hong) - In official discourses, low-level red is content intended to praise the CCP or the government but which is deemed as having the opposite effect because it is superficial, ill-conceived, or not genuine. The phrase entered official discourses in 2024. Internet users may also use the phrase more generally to criticize what they view as cheap displays of nationalism or pro-CCP sentiment.
- Fanchuan (反串黑; fǎnchuànhēi) – An indirect attack on a specific entity, such as a celebrity, video game, or brand. Individuals first feign support for the entity, and exhibit this allegiance widely; they then engage in offensive or irritating behavior, attempting to undermine the entity by association. This deceptive conduct is designed to tarnish the reputation of the target or its fan community.
- CP fandom behaviors or Ke CP (嗑CP) – Similar to shipping, refers to the activities of fans who take great satisfaction from the romantic relationships and interactions of their preferred pairings of idols or virtual characters. The verb ke in informal Chinese means being addicted to drugs.
- Little fresh meat (小鲜肉; xiǎo xiānròu) – Young, cute, handsome male idol, of around 12 to 25 years old. Originally used for stars, now used more generally by extension.
- Loser (屌丝; diǎosī) – "Diaosi" is used to describe young men born into a poor family and are unable to change the circumstances of their poverty. People usually use this phrase in an ironic and self-deprecating way. For example, someone might say "I am a diaosi" with a sigh when they see wealthy people with private cars and luxurious houses. The origin of this slang is unknown, but it is widely used today on the internet, and can be said to reflect that many people feel upset and discontented as they fail to change their lives no matter how much effort they have put in.
- Masculine woman (女汉子; nǚ hànzi) – The phrase nühanzi literally means "female man", and refers to women who possess traditionally masculine personality traits such as being brave and more independent, i.e. tomboys. They eschew makeup or do not like going shopping. Some repair electrical appliances. More importantly, these women do not have any boyfriends. The emergence of this type of women reflects the increasing social and economic status of women.
- The one to be blamed (黑锅俠; hēiguōxiá) – Internet slang for people who usually take responsibilities for others' faults (背黑锅; bei hei guo)
- Single dog (单身狗; dānshēngǒu) – The term that single people in China use to poke fun at themselves for being single.
- Slash youth (斜杠青年; xiégàngqīngnían) – Slash here means having multiple identities or careers. Youth refers to young people, usually from the twenties to thirties. It is used by young people to reflect the multiple part-time jobs/hobbies they undertake.
- Buddha-like mindset (佛系) is a term used by Chinese youth to describe people who reject the rat race in favour of a tranquil, apathetic life. The term has been applied to numerous areas such as parenting, employment, online shopping, fans, and relationships. For Buddha-like parenting, the adherents say that "there are not that many kids who will really amount to much, so why give them an exhausting childhood?"
- Genshintard (原批; yuánpī, a.k.a. OP) - Fanatical Genshin Impact players, primarily those who cannot tolerate any criticism of the game and instigate flame wars across social media platforms.

=== With altered meanings ===
- Vulgar tycoon (土豪; tǔháo) – Refers to irritating online game players who buy large amounts of game weapons in order to be glorified by others. Starting from late 2013, the meaning has changed and is now widely used to describe the nouveau riche in China (people who are wealthy but less cultured).
- Spare tire (备胎; bèitāi) – Refers to the person who is reserved for relationship; a backup.
- Big aunt (大姨妈; dàyímā) – A woman's period.
- The Eight Trigrams (八卦; bāguà) – To gossip.
- Cute (治愈; zhìyù) – original meaning is "heal". Nowadays, it is used as an adjective to describe something as cute or heartwarming.
- Run (润; rùn) – originally "profitable" or "to moisten or lubricate", now a term that expresses the desire to smoothly escape one's current country of residence.
- Hare (兔子; tùzǐ) - a nickname for self-identified People's Republic of China (PRC) patriots, with positive connotations. The metaphor of the hare as docile but not submissive (as in the idiom, "even a rabbit will bite when cornered") resonates with their perceptions of national identity. A related quip based on a near-homophone is that China is strong thanks to the leadership of the tùzǐ (hare) not the tūzi (baldhead, referring to Chiang Kai-shek and the Republic of China).
- "Cutting leeks" or "cutting chives" (割韭菜; gē jiǔcài) - marketing practices that focus on short-term profits without a long-term plan (referencing how the leaves of the hardy plant grow back after being cut and sold, i.e. there is a steady stream of new customers to profit from).
- "Eat melon" (吃瓜; chī guā) - being a bystander observing an online event or discourse.
- "House collapsed" (塌房; tāfáng) - a celebrity ruining their career with scandal.

== Puns ==
- River crab (河蟹; héxiè) – Pun on héxié (和谐) meaning "harmony". Online Chinese term for internet censorship commonly seen in forums and blogs.
- Let's do it (冲鸭; chōngyā) – Used as a verb, it means "come on, let's do it!" It is a homophonic expression of the word 冲呀; chōngya) where 呀 has been replaced with 鸭 as it looks cuter.

== Borrowings ==
=== From Japanese ===
- 3P – Threesome, as in the pornographic kind
- OL – office lady, a woman with an office job.
- Otaku (male, 宅男; zháinán) – Men with obsessive interests that leave no time for normal life outside the home, similar to geek or nerd in English.
- Otaku (female, 宅女; zháinǚ) – Female equivalent of zháinán

== Criticism ==
The People's Daily coined the term "vulgar Internet language" to refer the internet language that "offends the moral" and suggested a blacklist to discourage the usage of them.

== See also ==
- List of internet phenomena in China
- Mandarin Chinese profanity
- Cantonese internet slang
  - Cantonese profanity
