= Jia Junpeng =

Chinese internet meme

- Traditional Chinese: 賈君鵬
- Simplified Chinese: 贾君鹏
Transcriptions
Standard Mandarin
- Hanyu Pinyin: Jiǎ Jūnpéng

Jia Junpeng was an internet meme and catchphrase that became popular on the Internet in China in 2009.

The meme originated from a post on the Baidu forum for World of Warcraft: "Jia Junpeng, your mother is calling you home for dinner" (Chinese: 贾君鹏你妈妈喊你回家吃饭; pinyin: Jiǎ Jūnpéng nǐ mā mā hǎn nǐ huí jiā chī fàn). The thread went viral, and in a few days, it received hundreds of thousands of replies.

The phenomenon has been interpreted in various ways. Hu Jiqing, a communications professor, analysed it as an expression of the guilt of neglecting one's families due to video game addiction; World of Warcraft players interpreted it as a veiled reference to the outage NetEase (World of Warcraft's host) was experiencing; and a China Daily editorial called it "a demonstration of collective boredom".

== Origins ==
At 10:59 am on 16 July 2009, a post in Chinese appeared on the Chinese portal Baidu in the forum for the game World of Warcraft. It was titled "Jia Junpeng, your mother is calling you home for dinner" (Chinese: 贾君鹏你妈妈喊你回家吃饭; pinyin: Jiǎ Jūnpéng nǐ mā mā hǎn nǐ huí jiā chī fàn). The body of the thread consisted of only 2 letters, "RT" (如题; Rú Tí), an abbreviation that means "as the title (suggests)". The poster's identity and motivation are unknown. Soon, a post authored by "Jia Junpeng", replied, "I'm not going home for dinner, I'm having dinner at the Internet café. Please tell my mom that." This user registered three minutes after the initial post.

After six hours, the thread received more than 17,000 replies and 400,000 views; most of these were from young people. Some forum users who replied changed their usernames to "Jia Junpeng's dad", "Jia Junpeng's grandpa", "Jia Junpeng's sister", "Jia Junpeng's dog", and so on, forming a huge Jia family. Follow-up posts became more ridiculous and meaningless. People created kuso pictures, started online hunts for the original poster, and the rate of replies reached several thousand per second. The thread received 243,000 replies and 6 million views by 9 pm the next day. The thread stopped when it became saturated at 1:38 pm on 20 July – the 315,649 comments received translated into 10,421 pages of posts.

== Interpretation, reception and aftermath ==
World of Warcraft had been inaccessible in China for more than 40 days. Its host, NetEase, said it was suffering outages due to an attack by a competitor. Five million Chinese WoW players were frustrated and impatient, so "Jia Junpeng, your mother is calling you home for dinner" has been interpreted by WoW players as "NetEase, hurry up and start the World of Warcraft service".

According to columnist Guo Zhichun, "the newly popular internet phenomenon reflected some [characteristics] of popular culture such as anti-intellectualism, unwillingness to care about something's original value, confusion, willingness to follow the crowd, decadence, and immaturity." Hu Jiqing, associate professor from the College of Journalism and Communications at Nanjing University, said the phrase "your mother is calling you home for dinner" causes young people to reflect, since those addicted to Internet games often feel guilty about neglecting their families. A China Daily editorial called it "a demonstration of collective boredom."

In September 2009, the Los Angeles Times reported that "the catchphrase has gone viral in recent weeks," and that it was often photoshopped into various places, such as banners, signs in public places, or as a caption to a humorous image. It was used on T-shirts, blogs, and in songs, and it was used by human rights activists to demand the release of a jailed legal scholar. Businesses have sought to capitalise on the meme: a car dealer in Sichuan hung a banner that read "Jia Junpeng, your mom is calling you to drive home a Roewe 550", and one restaurant sign was spotted with the slogan "Jia Junpeng, your mom is calling you to eat Yanjing Hotpot!"

== See also ==
- List of internet phenomena
- Internet in the People's Republic of China
- Very erotic very violent
- Baidu 10 Mythical Creatures
