= Kuso =

East Asian internet subcultures focusing on parody

Kuso is a term used in East Asia for the internet culture that generally includes all types of camp and parody. In Japanese, kuso (糞,くそ,クソ) is a word that is commonly translated to English as curse words such as fuck, shit, damn, and bullshit (both kuso and shit refer to feces), and is often said as an interjection. It is also used to describe outrageous matters and objects of poor quality. This usage of kuso was brought into Taiwan around 2000 by young people who frequently visited Japanese websites and quickly became an internet phenomenon, spreading to Taiwan and Hong Kong and subsequently to mainland China.

== From Japanese kusogē to Taiwanese kuso ==
The root of Taiwanese "kuso" was not the Japanese word kuso itself but kusogē (クソゲー). The word kusogē is a clipped compound of kuso (糞,くそ; feces) and gēmu (ゲーム; game), meaning "crappy (video) games". This term was eventually brought outside of Japan and its meaning shifted in the West, becoming a term of endearment (and even a category) towards either bad games of nostalgic value and/or poorly-developed games that still remain enjoyable as a whole.

This philosophy soon spread to Taiwan, where people would share the games and often satirical comments on BBSes, and the term was further shortened. Games generally branded as kuso in Taiwan include Hong Kong 97 and the Death Crimson series.

Because kusogē were often unintentionally funny, soon the definition of kuso in Taiwan shifted to "anything hilarious", and people started to brand anything outrageous and funny as kuso. Parodies, such as the Chinese robot Xianxingzhe ridiculed by a Japanese website, were marked as kuso. Mo lei tau films by Stephen Chow are often said to be kuso as well. The Cultural Revolution is often a subject of parody too, with songs such as I Love Beijing Tiananmen spread around the internet for laughs.

Some, however, limit the definition of kuso to "humour limited to those about Hong Kong comics or Japanese anime, manga, and games". Kuso by such definitions are primarily doujin or fanfiction. Fictional crossovers are common media for kuso, such as redrawing certain bishōjo anime in the style of Fist of the North Star, or blending elements of two different items together. (For example, in Densha de D, both Initial D and Densha de Go! are parodied, as Takumi races trains and drifts his railcar across multiple railway tracks.)

In China, earlier e'gao works consisted of images edited in Adobe Photoshop. An example of this would be the Little Fatty internet meme.

== Compared to e'gao ==
In Chinese, kuso is called "e'gao" (simplified Chinese: 恶搞; traditional Chinese: 惡搞; pinyin: ègǎo), with the first character meaning "evil" or "gross" and the second meaning "to make [fun] of [someone/something]." In 2007 the word was so new that it was not listed in Chinese dictionaries.

According to Christopher Rea, "E'gao, the main buzzword associated with online Chinese parody, literally means 'evil doings' or 'malicious manipulation'"; he notes that e'gao's "semantic associations [to kuso] can be misleading, however, since e'gao is not fundamentally scatological—or even, as the Chinese term might suggest, malicious. In its broad usage, it may be applied to parody of any stripe, from fan tribute-mimicry to withering mockery. In a more restricted sense, it refers the practice of digitally manipulating mass culture products to comic effect and circulating them via the internet. The term e'gao may thus be interpreted in multiple senses, as it denotes variously a genre, a mode, a practice, an ethos and a culture."

== See also ==
- Culture jamming
- Internet meme
- Internet slang
- List of Internet phenomena in China
- Japanese mobile phone culture
- Shitposting
- Internet troll
- B movie
- Détournement
- Kuso Miso Technique
