= Mandarin Chinese profanity =

Mandarin Chinese profanity most commonly involves sexual references and scorn of the target's ancestors, especially their mother. Other Mandarin insults accuse people of not being human. Compared to English, scatological and blasphemous references are less often used.

In a 1968 academic study of Chinese pejorative words, more than a third of the 325-term corpus of abusive expressions compare the insulted person with an animal, with the worst curses being "animal" generally, "pig, dog, animal", or "animal in dress", which deny the person of human dignity. The expressions contain metaphorical references to the following domesticated animals: dogs, cows, and chickens (12 or 11 terms each), (8 times), horse (4), cat (3), and duck (2), and one each to sheep, donkey and camel. A variety of wild animals are used in these pejorative terms, and the most common are monkey (7 times) and tiger (5 times), symbolizing ugliness and power respectively.

== Terms ==
=== Insults ===
Certain terms are generally used for the purpose of insulting the recipient, which include:

- qiáo bù qǐ (瞧不起) – To look down upon, though it can be benign in many contexts.
- cè nà (冊那) – Shanghainese for "fuck", similar in usage to cào (肏) albeit less strong.
- cào nǐ mā (肏你媽) – "Fuck your mother". May also be written with the synonymous homophonic character cào (操) (see Grass Mud Horse).
- mā le gè bī (媽了個屄) – "Your mother's fucking cunt" (i.e. "Motherfucker").
- shǎ bī (傻屄) – "Stupid cunt".
- diǎo sī (屌丝) – Literally "penis hair", used to refer to a young male of mediocre appearance and social standing, often in an ironic and self depreciating manner.
- chù shēng (畜生) – "Brute". Used as a metaphor for describing an immoral person.
- qù sǐ ba (去死吧) – "Go to hell".

=== Interjections ===
Interjections generally used to express surprise and anger include:

- wǒ cào (我肏) – "Holy shit" (literally "I fuck"). May also be written as wò cáo (卧槽) in Chinese Internet slang.
- wǒ diū (我丢) – Literally "I throw". Carried over from Cantonese, this interjection (primarily used in southern China) is technically the same as "我肏", though it is much milder and is specifically used to express surprise.
- mā de (媽的) – "Damn it!"

=== Racial slurs ===
Xenophobic, racial, and otherwise discriminatory slurs intended to offend the recipient based on their ethnicity and race include:

- ā gòng zǐ (阿共仔; 'Commie guy') – A derogatory slang term used by Taiwanese against mainland Chinese, which refers to the Chinese Communist Party and communism as an ad hominem.
- èr guǐ zǐ (二鬼子; 'second devils') – (See Riben guizi) During the Second World War, 二鬼子 referred to traitors among the Han Chinese and Koreans in the Imperial Japanese Army, as the Japanese were known as "鬼子" (devils) for massacring innocent children and women. Today, 二鬼子 is used to describe ethnic Koreans who had been absorbed into Japan and joined the Japanese Imperial Army. It is rarely used as a slur in recent times.
- xiǎo rìběn (小日本; 'Little Japanese') – An ethnic slur targeting Japanese people, especially Japanese invaders, which was used beginning in the Second Sino-Japanese War. It is the Mandarin Chinese equivalent of the English slang term Jap, and was used to mock the invaders' physically short stature compared to Chinese people, and Japan's smaller area size compared to China. However, in recent times, ordinary Japanese people may not be greatly offended by the term, instead finding them ironically "cute", thus rendering the slur less offending than intended.
- hēi guǐ (黑鬼; 'Black ghost') – The Mandarin Chinese equivalent of the English racial slur nigger.
- Huana (番仔; hoan-á) – A Hokkien term in literally meaning "foreigner" or "non-Chinese". Used by most Overseas Chinese to refer generally to indigenous Southeast Asians and Taiwanese indigenous peoples. In the Philippines, this term is used by Chinese Filipinos towards indigenous Filipinos. In Malaysia, this term is instead used by Chinese Malaysians towards Malaysian Malays.
- Yuènán hóuzi (越南猴子; 'Vietnamese monkeys') – A term used by the Han Chinese to derogatorily refer towards Viet people by associating them as being uncivilized, barbaric, dirty, primitive, and otherwise backward people. This term also alludes to the historical region of Nam Viet (南越), a province that was ruled by the Han dynasty during the First Chinese domination of Vietnam; when mixed with the word "southern barbarian" (南蛮) is also used as an ethnic slur towards the Vietnamese by the Han Chinese.

== See also ==
- Baidu 10 Mythical Creatures
- Cantonese profanity
- Diu (Cantonese)
- Grass Mud Horse
- Chinese Internet slang
