= List of encyclopedias in Chinese =

Note: Within this list, Chinese encyclopedia translates leishu, a traditional Chinese reference work that, unlike a modern encyclopedia with expressly written articles, consists of excerpts from primary texts arranged by categories. Fascicle translates juan 卷 "scroll; fascicle; volume" for early (pre-20th century) encyclopedias and volume refers to modern encyclopedias.

List of encyclopedias in Chinese
| Date | Period | Title | Notes |
|---|---|---|---|
| c. 5th cent. BCE | Spring and Autumn / Warring States period | Kaogongji | Oldest extant technical encyclopedia |
| c. 4th cent. BCE | Warring States | Erya | First Chinese dictionary/encyclopedia |
| c. 2nd cent. BCE | Han dynasty | Shiben | First Chinese encyclopedia of origins, largely a lost work, but later partially reconstructed |
| c. 222 CE | Cao Wei | Huanglan | First Chinese leishu encyclopedia, for Emperor Cao Pi, lost work, with only fragments surviving |
| 624 | Tang dynasty | Yiwen Leiju | Encyclopedia of literature, Ouyang Xun, 100 fascicles |
| 631 | Tang dynasty | Qunshu zhiyao | Political encyclopedia, Wei Zheng |
| 668 | Tang dynasty | Fayuan Zhulin | Chinese Buddhist encyclopedia, 100 fascicles |
| 727 | Tang dynasty | Chuxue ji | Comprehensive encyclopedic work for students |
| 729 | Tang dynasty | Kaiyuan Zhanjing | First Chinese astrology encyclopedia, Gautama Siddha, 120 fascicles |
| 801 | Tang dynasty | Tongdian | Encyclopedia of institutional history, Du You, 200 fascicles |
| 978 | Northern Song dynasty | Taiping Guangji | Collection of historical and supernatural stories, Li Fang, 500 fascicles |
| 983 | Northern Song dynasty | Taiping Yulan | Encyclopedia of history and literature, Li Fang, 1,000 fascicles |
| 985 | Northern Song dynasty | Wenyuan Yinghua | Anthology of literature from Liang dynasty to the Five Dynasties era, Li Fang, 1,000 fascicles |
| 1013 | Northern Song dynasty | Cefu Yuangui | Largest Song period encyclopedia, Wang Qinruo, 1,000 fascicles |
| 1088 | Northern Song dynasty | Mengxi Bitan | Encyclopedia of natural phenomena, Shen Kuo, 30 fascicles |
| 1145 | Southern Song dynasty | Shishi Leiyuan | Encyclopedia of various topics |
| 1161 | Southern Song dynasty | Tongzhi | Comprehensive encyclopedia of history, 200 fascicles |
| 1317 | Yuan dynasty | Wenxian Tongkao | |
| 1408 | Ming dynasty | Yongle Encyclopedia | Largest general leishu encyclopedia, quotes from 8,000 texts, 22,937 fascicles |
| 1609 | Ming dynasty | Sancai Tuhui | Illustrated encyclopedia of articles in many fields of knowledge, 106 fascicles |
| 1621 | Ming dynasty | Wubei Zhi | Encyclopedic history of military affairs, 240 fascicles |
| 1627 | Ming dynasty | Yuanxi Qiqi Tushuo Luzui | Chinese illustrated encyclopedia of Western mechanical devices, Johann Schreck, 3 fascicles |
| 1637 | Ming dynasty | Tiangong Kaiwu | Encyclopedia of science and technology, Song Yingxing, 18 fascicles |
| 1726 | Qing dynasty | Complete Classics Collection of Ancient China | Largest leishu ever printed, 852,408 pages, 10,000 fascicles |
| 1773 | Lê dynasty (Vietnam) | Vân đài loại ngữ | Chinese-language Vietnamese encyclopedia, Lê Quý Đôn, 4 fascicles |
| 1782 | Qing dynasty | Complete Library of the Four Treasuries | Largest collection of Chinese history, philosophy, and literature, Ji Yun, 79,000 fascicles |
| 1938 | Republic of China | Cihai | First modern general-purpose encyclopedic dictionary, 2 volumes |
| 1978 | People's Republic of China | Encyclopedia of China | First large-scale modern Chinese encyclopedia, 74 volumes |
| 1980-1993 | Republic of China | Chinese Encyclopedia | Illustrated general-purpose encyclopedia, 10 volumes |
| 1985-1991 | People's Republic of China | Concise Encyclopædia Britannica | Translated general-purpose encyclopedia, 11 volumes |
| 2002 | Modern China | Chinese Wikipedia | Chronologically first Chinese online encyclopedia but third by the number of articles |
| 2005 | Modern China | Hudong | Probably the largest Chinese online encyclopedia |
| 2006 | Modern China | Baidu Baike | One of the two largest Chinese-language collaborative web-based encyclopedia |
| 1989-2019 | Modern China | Zhonghua Dadian (中华大典) | Encyclopedia of Chinese classic texts, "the biggest cultural project since the founding of the People's Republic of China" |

== See also ==
- The Encyclopaedia Sinica (British Hong Kong, 1917), the first English-language encyclopedia on China, 1 volume
