= Chinese encyclopedia =

Overview of the Chinese encyclopedia culture

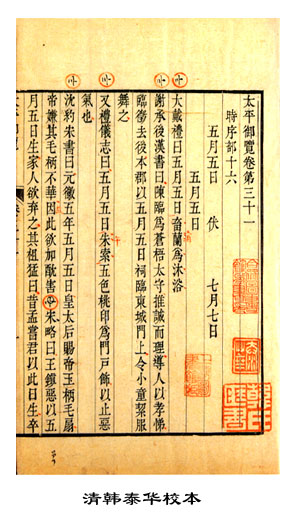
A page from a Qing edition of the 983 CE Taiping Yulan concerning the seasons

Chinese encyclopedias comprise both Chinese language encyclopedias and foreign language ones about China or Chinese topics. There is a type of native Chinese reference work called leishu (lit. "categorized writings") that is sometimes translated as "encyclopedia", but although these collections of quotations from classic texts are expansively "encyclopedic", a leishu is more accurately described as a "compendium" or "anthology". The long history of Chinese leishu encyclopedias began with the (222 CE) Huanglan ("Emperor's Mirror") leishu and continues with online encyclopedias such as Baidu Baike and Chinese Wikipedia.

== Terminology ==
The Chinese language has several translation equivalents for the English word encyclopedia.

Diǎn 典 "standard; ceremony; canon; allusion; dictionary; encyclopedia" occurs in compounds such as zìdiǎn 字典 "character dictionary; lexicon", cídiǎn 辭典 "word/phrase dictionary; encyclopedia", dàdiǎn 大典 "collection of great classics; big dictionary"; and titles such as the 801 Tongdian ("Comprehensive Encyclopedia") and 1408 Yongle Dadian ("Yongle Emperor's Encyclopedia").

Lèishū 類書 (lit. "category book") "reference work arranged by category; encyclopedia" is commonly translated as "traditional Chinese encyclopedia", but they differ from modern encyclopedias in that they are compendia composed of selected and categorically arranged quotations from Chinese classics, "the name encyclopedia having been applied to them because they embrace the whole realm of knowledge" (Teng and Biggerstaff 1971: 83).

Bǎikē 百科 (lit. "hundred subjects") in the words bǎikēquánshū 百科全書 (with "comprehensive book") and bǎikēcídiǎn 百科辭典 (with "dictionary") specifically refer to Western-style "encyclopedias". Encyclopedia titles first used Bǎikēquánshū in the final decades of the 19th century.

== History ==
Encyclopedic leishu anthologies were published in China for nearly two millennia before the first modern encyclopedia, the English-language 1917 Encyclopaedia Sinica.

While English usually differentiates between dictionary and encyclopedia, Chinese does not necessarily make the distinction. For instance, the ancient Erya, which lists synonyms collated by semantic fields, is described as a dictionary, a thesaurus, and an encyclopedia. The German sinologist Wolfgang Bauer describes the historical parallel between Western encyclopedias and Chinese leishu, all of which arose from two roots, glossaries and anthologies or florilegia.

The boundaries between both are quite fluid at first; the shorter the entries and the more exclusively they are directed to the definition of the word concerned, the more the work partakes of the character of a dictionary, while a longer commentary delving into history and culture and provided with extensive quotations of sources is, conversely, more characteristic of the encyclopaedia. The dividing line between a language lexicon (such as glossaries, onomastica and rhyming dictionaries) and a factual lexicon, to which all general and special encyclopaedias belong, is only clearly drawn when, in addition to the definitions, necessarily supported by literary references, an interpretation appears which takes into consideration not only the current literary usage but also the thing itself, which not only describes the subject but also, at times, evaluates and thereby forms a true connection between the new and the old. The very characteristic of the traditional Chinese encyclopaedia as in contrast to that in the West is that these distinctions were never clearly drawn. All Chinese encyclopaedias are anthologies, upon which were grafted greatly varying forms of dictionary arrangement. They consist of (generally quite long) quotations arranged in one order or another and, although they may include an opinion on the subject, they rarely contain an original opinion.

Robert L. Fowler, Professor of Greek at the University of Bristol, says that although comprehensiveness is a primary criterion in defining an "encyclopedia", there are encyclopedias of individual subjects (e.g., Encyclopaedia of Chess Openings) that defy the etymology from Greek enkyklios paideia "the circle of subjects". He says, "To call a comprehensive treatment of one subject an "encyclopaedia" is a catachresis known already in medieval China, where the term leishu, properly a collection of classical texts on many fields, came to be applied to similar treatments of one subject only, for instance the use of jade".

=== Imperial period ===
Chinese scholar-bureaucrats compiled about 600 leishu traditional Chinese "encyclopedias" between the 3rd and 18th centuries. About 200 of these are extant today, and 10-20 are still used by historians. Most were published by imperial mandate during the Tang dynasty (618-907), Song dynasty (960-1279), Ming dynasty (1368-1644), and early Qing dynasty (1644-1911). Some leishu were huge publications. For instance, the (1726) Complete Classics Collection of Ancient China contained an estimated 3 to 4 times the amount of material in the Encyclopædia Britannica Eleventh Edition.

Although most scholars consider the 222 CE Huanglan (see below) to be the first Chinese leishu encyclopedia. Needham, Lu, and Huang call the late 4th to early 2nd centuries BCE Erya the oldest Chinese encyclopedia, and consider its derivative literature (beginning with the Fangyan and Huanglan) as the main line of descent for encyclopedias in China.

The c. 239 BCE Lüshi Chunqiu, which is an anthology of quotes from many Hundred Schools of Thought philosophical texts, is another text sometimes characterized as the first Chinese "encyclopedia". Although its content is "encyclopedic", the text was compiled to show rulers and ministers how to govern well, and was not intended to be a comprehensive summary of knowledge.

During the Han dynasty, the 2nd century BCE Shiben ("Book of Origins") was the earliest Chinese dictionary / encyclopedia of origins. It explained imperial genealogies, the origins of surnames, and records of legendary and historical inventors. Among subsequent encyclopedias of origins, the largest was Chen Yuanlong's 1735 Gezhi Jingyuan (格致鏡元, Mirror of Scientific and Technological Origins).

Shortly after the fall of the Han dynasty, the first true Chinese leishu encyclopedia appeared. The 222 Huanglan ("Imperial Mirror"), which is now a lost work, was compiled for Cao Pi, the first emperor of the Three Kingdoms Cao Wei state (r. 220-226), in order to provide rulers and ministers with conveniently arranged summaries of current knowledge (like the Lüshi Chunqiu above).

An important new type of leishu encyclopedia appeared in the early Tang dynasty (618–907), after the administration made the imperial examination obligatory for all applicants into government service. Unlike earlier Chinese encyclopedias (such as the Huanglan) that were intended to provide information for rulers and government officials, these new anthologies were intended for scholars who were trying to enter into government, and provided general information, and especially literary knowledge about the classics. For instance, the famous calligrapher Ouyang Xun supervised compilation of the 624 Yiwen Leiju ("Collection of Literature Arranged by Categories") encyclopedia of literature, which quotes 1,431 diverse literary texts. Specialized encyclopedias were another innovation during the Tang period. The 668 Fayuan Zhulin ("Forest of Gems in the Garden of the Dharma") was a Chinese Buddhist encyclopedia compiled by the monk Dao Shi 道世. The 729 Kaiyuan Zhanjing ("Treatise on Astrology of the Kaiyuan Era") is a Chinese astrology encyclopedia compiled by Gautama Siddha and others during Emperor Xuanzong of Tang's Kaiyuan era (713-741).

The Golden Age of encyclopedia writing began with the Song dynasty (960–1279), "when the venerated past became the general standard in Chinese thought for almost one whole millennium". The Four Great Books of Song were compiled by a committee of scholars under the supervision of Li Fang. First, the 978 Taiping Guangji ("Extensive Records of the Taiping Era") was a collection of about 7,000 stories selected from over 300 classic texts from the Han to the Song dynasties. Second, the 983 Taiping Yulan ("Imperial Reader of the Taiping Era") anthologized citations from 2,579 different texts, ranging from poetry, proverbs, and steles to miscellaneous works. Third, the 985 Wenyuan Yinghua ("Finest Blossoms in the Garden of Literature"), quotes from many literary genres, dating from the Liang dynasty to the Five Dynasties era. Fourth, the Cefu Yuangui ("Models from the Archives"), was the largest Song encyclopedia, almost twice the size of the Taiping Yulan. Li Fang began compilation in 1005 while Wang Qinruo and others finished in 1013. It comprises quotes from political essays, biographies, memorials, and decrees. Another notable Song leishu encyclopedia was the polymath Shen Kuo's 1088 Mengxi Bitan ("Dream Pool Essays"), which covers many realms of the humanities and natural sciences. The 1161 Tongzhi ("Comprehensive Records"), which was compiled by the Southern Song dynasty scholar Zheng Qiao 鄭樵, became a model for later encyclopedias.

The Ming dynasty period (1368–1644) was, in comparison with the Song period, of less significance for the history of Chinese encyclopedias. However, the Yongle Emperor commissioned compilation of the 1408 Yongle Encyclopedia, which was a collection of excerpts from works in philosophy, history, arts, and sciences—and the world's largest encyclopedia at the time. The 1609 Sancai Tuhui ("Pictorial Compendium of the Three Realms" [heaven, earth, and people]) was compiled by Wang Qi and Wang Siyi. This early illustrated encyclopedia comprised articles on many subjects including history, astronomy, geography, biology, and more, including a very accurate Shanhai Yudi Quantu world map. The 1621 Wubei Zhi ("Treatise on Armament Technology") is the most comprehensive military encyclopedia in Chinese history. The 1627 Diagrams and explanations of the wonderful machines of the Far West was an illustrated encyclopedia of Western mechanical devices translated into Chinese by the Jesuit Johann Schreck and the scholar Wang Zheng 王徵. Song Yingxing's (1637) Tiangong Kaiwu ("Exploitation of the Works of Nature") was an illustrated encyclopedia of science and technology, and notable for breaking from Chinese tradition by rarely quoting earlier works. In Ming China, with the spreading of written knowledge to strata outside the literati, household riyong leishu 日用類書 ("Encyclopedias for daily use") began to be compiled, "summarizing practical information for townsfolk and others not primarily concerned with mastering the Confucian heritage."

The last great leishu encyclopedias were published during the Qing dynasty (1644–1911). The 1726 Complete Classics Collection of Ancient China was a vast encyclopedic work compiled during the reigns of Emperors Kangxi and Yongzheng. The 1782 Complete Library of the Four Treasuries (or Siku Quanshu) was the largest Chinese leishu encyclopedia, and commissioned by the Qianlong Emperor in order to show that the Qing dynasty could surpass the Ming Yongle Encyclopedia. This colossal collection contained some 800 million Chinese characters, and remained the world's largest encyclopedia until recently being surpassed by the English Wikipedia. The emperor ordered the destruction of 2,855 books that were considered to be anti-Manchu, but were listed in the 1798 Annotated Bibliography of the Four Treasuries annotated catalog. The 1773 Vân đài loại ngữ ("Categorized Sayings from the Library") is a Chinese-language Vietnamese encyclopedia compiled by the scholar Lê Quý Đôn.

=== Modern period ===
Present-day Chinese encyclopedias—in the common Western sense of "comprehensive reference work covering a wide range of subjects"—include both printed editions and online encyclopedias.

Among printed encyclopedias, the earliest was the (1917) The Encyclopaedia Sinica compiled the English missionary Samuel Couling. The 1938 Cihai ("Sea of Words") is a general-purpose encyclopedic dictionary that covers many fields of knowledge. The Zhonghua Book Company published the first edition, and the Shanghai Lexicographical Publishing House issued revised editions in 1979, 1989, 1999, and 2009, making the Cihai a standard reference work for generations. The 1980-1993 Zhongguo Da Baike Quanshu or Encyclopedia of China is the first comprehensive (74 volume) Chinese encyclopedia. Compilation began in 1978, and the Encyclopedia of China Publishing House published individual volumes from 1980 through 1993. There is a 2009 concise second edition, as well as CD-ROM and online versions. The (1981–83) Zhonghua Baike Quanshu or Chinese Encyclopedia is a 10-volume comprehensive reference work published by the Chinese Culture University in Taiwan. An online version is also available. The 1985–91 Chinese-language edition Concise Encyclopædia Britannica or Jianming Buliedian Baike Quanshu is an 11-volume translation based on the Micropædia portion of the 1987 15th edition of the Encyclopædia Britannica.

Among major online Chinese encyclopedias, for Standard Chinese, the two largest both began in 2005, the Baike.com Encyclopedia and the Baidu Baike. There is the Chinese Wikipedia (2002–present), and for varieties of Chinese, there are Cantonese, Mindong, Minnan, Wu, and Gan Wikipedias, as well as the Classical Chinese Wikipedia (zh-classical:). Lastly, there are modern English-language encyclopedias of China. For example, the 1991 2nd edition of the Cambridge Encyclopedia of China, the 2009 Brill's Encyclopedia of China, and the 5-volume 2009 Berkshire Encyclopedia of China.

== See also ==
- Chinese literature
- List of encyclopedias in Chinese
