= Names of Ho Chi Minh City =

Different names of the Vietnamese city

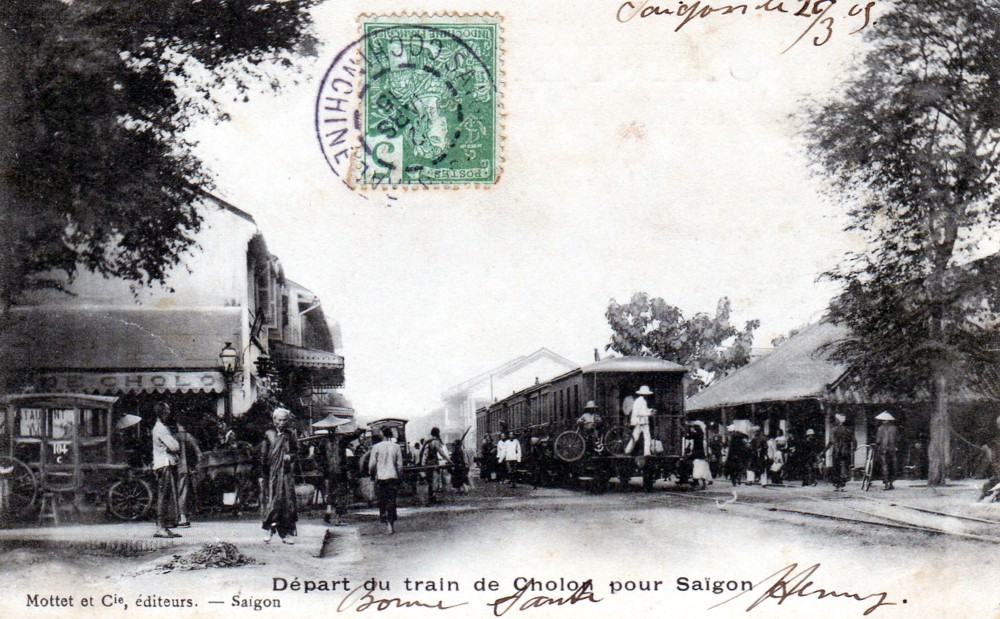
A 1910 postcard showing the name "Saigon" (French: Saïgon), a westernized version of the Vietnamese Sài Gòn.

The city now known as Ho Chi Minh City (Vietnamese: Thành phố Hồ Chí Minh Vietnamese pronunciation: [tʰan˨˩ fow˦˥ how˨˩ cɪj˦˥ mɨn˧˧]) has gone by several different names during its long history, reflecting settlements by different ethnic, cultural and political groups.

Originally known as Prey Nôkôr while being a part of the Khmer Empire, (Note: "The Khmer name for Saigon, by the way, is Prey Nokor; prey means forest, nokor home or city." Norodom, Sihanouk (1980). War and Hope: The Case for Cambodia. Pantheon Books. p. 54. ISBN 0-394-51115-8.) it came to be dubbed Sài Gòn (Vietnamese: [ʂaːj˨˩ ɣɔŋ˨˩/saːj˨˩ ɣɔŋ˨˩]) informally by Vietnamese settlers fleeing the Trịnh–Nguyễn Wars in the north. In time, control of the city and the area passed to the Vietnamese, who gave the city the name of Gia Định. This name remained until the time of French conquest in the 1860s, when the occupying force adopted the name Saïgon for the city, a westernized form of the traditional Vietnamese name.

The current name was given after the Fall of Saigon in 1975, and honors Hồ Chí Minh, the first leader of the Democratic Republic of Vietnam. (Note: The text of the resolution is as follows: By the National Assembly of the Socialist Republic of Vietnam, 6th tenure, 1st session, for officially renaming Saigon-Gia Dinh City as Ho Chi Minh City. The National Assembly of the Socialist Republic of Vietnam Considering the boundless love of the people of Saigon-Gia Dinh City for President Ho Chi Minh and their wish for the city to be named after him; Considering the long and difficult revolutionary struggle launched in Saigon-Gia Dinh City, with several glorious feats, deserves the honor of being named after President Ho Chi Minh; After discussing the suggestion of the Presidium of the National Assembly's meeting; Decides to rename Saigon-Gia Dinh City as Ho Chi Minh City.) However, the informal name of Sài Gòn remains in daily speech both domestically and internationally, especially among the Vietnamese diaspora and local Vietnamese.

== Khmer name ==
The area where present-day Ho Chi Minh City is located was likely inhabited long since prehistory; the kingdom of Funan and later Chenla maintained a presence in the Mekong Delta for centuries. The city was known as Prey Nôkôr (Khmer: ព្រៃនគរ) to the Khmer Empire, which likely maintained a settlement centuries before its rise in the 11th and 12th centuries. (Note: "At the height of the Angkorian Empire's economic and political strength, during the eleventh and twelfth centuries, its rulers established and fostered the growth of Prey Nokor[...] It is possible that there already had been a settlement at this location in the Mekong marshes for some centuries, depending, as Prey Nokor did, on the handling of goods traded between the countries bordering the South China Sea and the interior provinces of the empire." Salkin, Robert M.; Ring, Trudy (1996). Schellinger, Paul E.; Salkin, Robert M. (eds.). Asia and Oceania. International Dictionary of Historic Places. Vol. 5. Taylor & Francis. p. 353. ISBN 1-884964-04-4.) The most popular interpretation of the name, and one supported by former Cambodian King Norodom Sihanouk, suggests that the name means "forest city" or "forest kingdom"—prey meaning forest or jungle, and nôkôr being a Khmer word of Sanskrit origin meaning city or kingdom. The name Krŭng Prey Nôkôr (Khmer: ក្រុងព្រៃនគរ; "Prey Nôkôr City") is currently used to refer to Ho Chi Minh City in the Khmer language.

== Vietnamese names ==
=== Sài Gòn ===
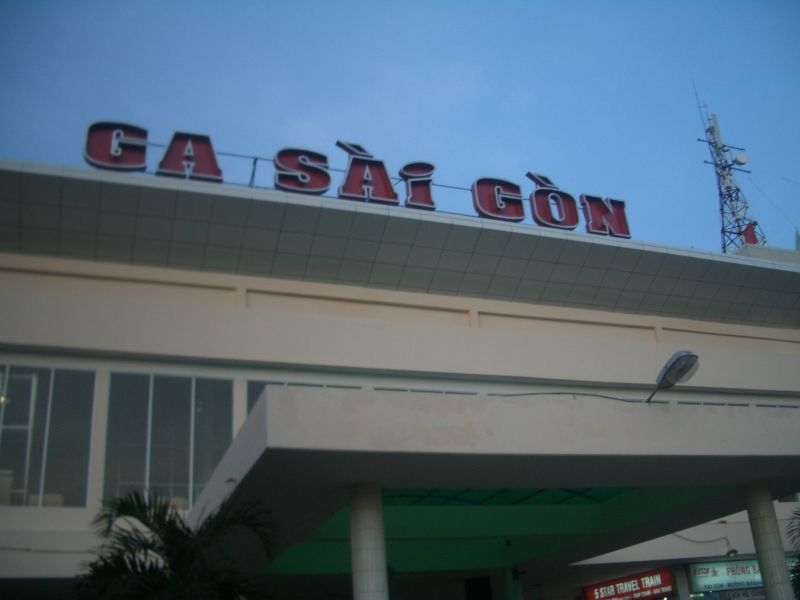
Sài Gòn Railway Station retains the traditional name used informally since the 1620s.

Beginning in the 1620s, Prey Nôkôr was gradually settled by Vietnamese refugees fleeing the Trịnh–Nguyễn War further to the north. In 1623, Khmer King Chey Chettha II (1618–1628) allowed the Vietnamese to settle in the area, which they colloquially referred to as Sài Gòn, and to set up a custom house at Prey Nôkôr. The increasing waves of Vietnamese settlers which followed overwhelmed the Khmer kingdom—weakened as it was due to war with Thailand—and slowly Vietnamized the area. Upon capturing the city during the Cochinchina Campaign in 1859, the French officially westernized the city's traditional name into "Saigon" (French: Saïgon).

Since the time of original Vietnamese settlement, the informal name of Sài Gòn has remained in daily speech; apart from official matters, it is still the most common way to refer to the city inside Vietnam, despite an official name change after the end of the Vietnam War in 1975. Sài Gòn continued to informally refer to the central district, District 1, a portion of which was officially designated as Saigon ward in 2025. Sài Gòn Railway Station, the main railway station serving the city, retains the name, as well as the city's zoo. The name is also found in company names, book titles and even on airport departure boards: the IATA code for Tân Sơn Nhất International Airport is SGN.

There is much debate about the origins of the name, the etymology of which is analyzed below. The Vietnamese most often write the name as Sài Gòn, in two words, following the traditional convention in Vietnamese spelling. Some, however, exceptionally write the name of the city as "SaiGon" or "Saigon" in order to save space or give the name a more Westernized look.

In addition, both the names Saigon and Ho Chi Minh City appear within the official seal of the city.

==== Etymology ====
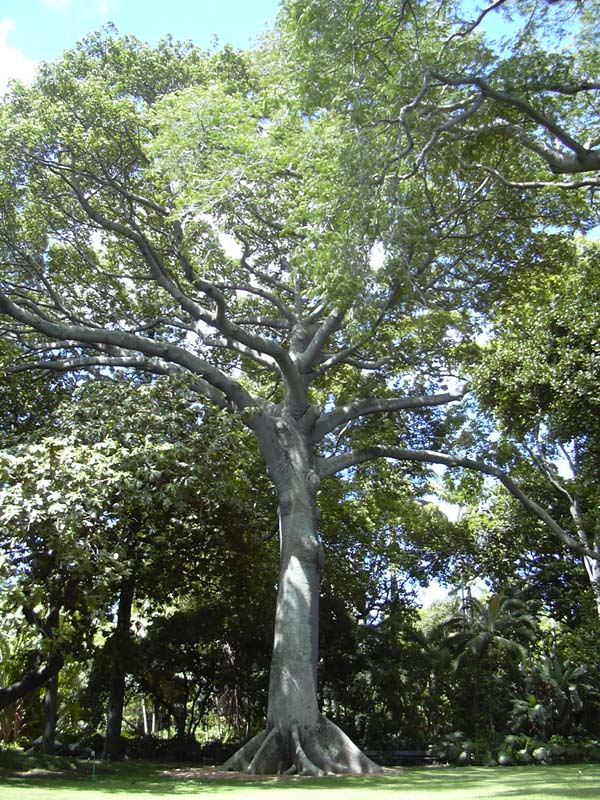
Sài Gòn may refer to the Bombax ceiba (kapok trees; bông gòn) that are common around Ho Chi Minh City.

===== Khmer etymology =====
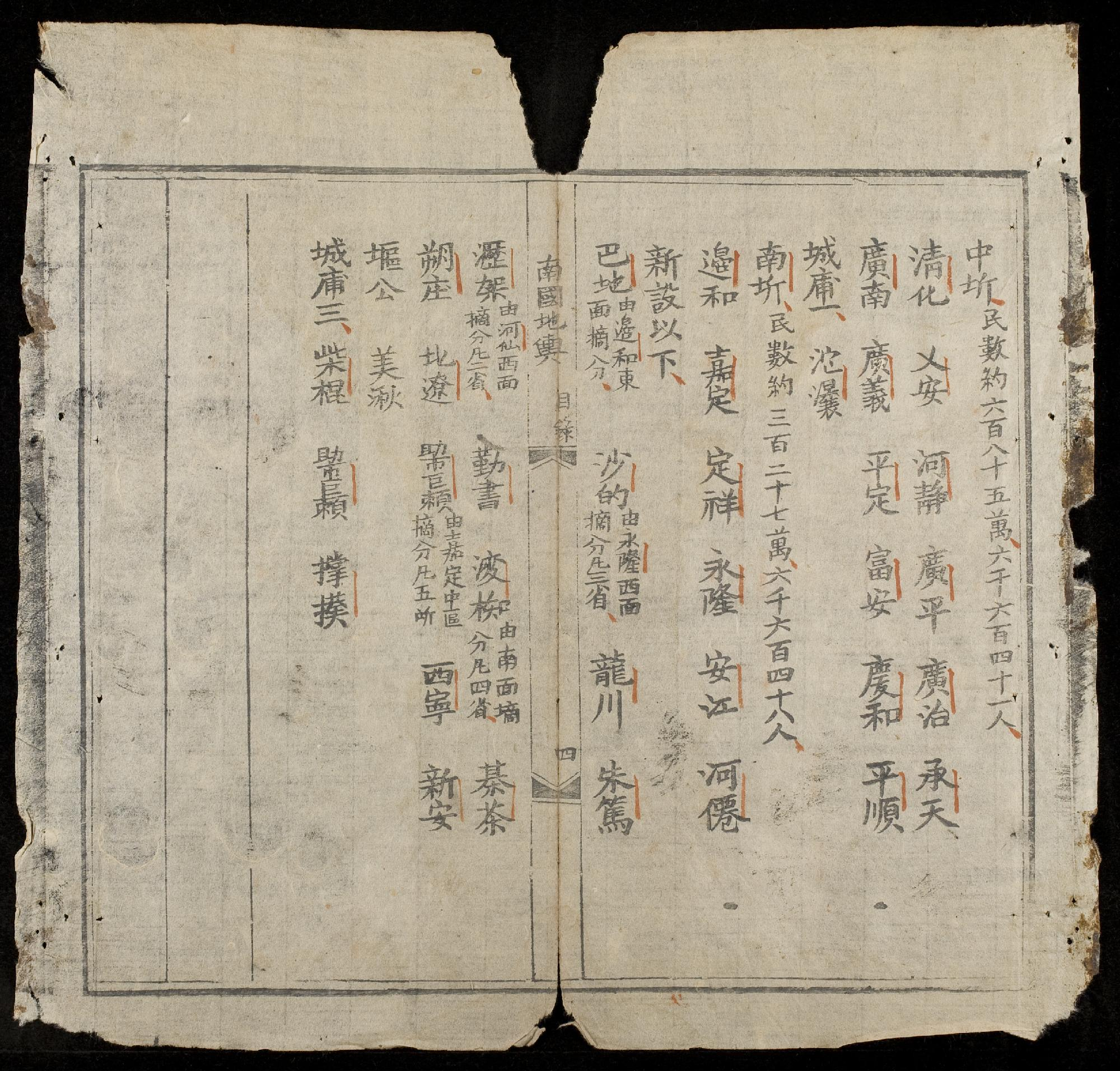
Saigon is written here as 柴棍 along with other Southern Vietnamese cities. (On the left of the page, first row after "城庯三")

The etymology of Saigon is uncertain.

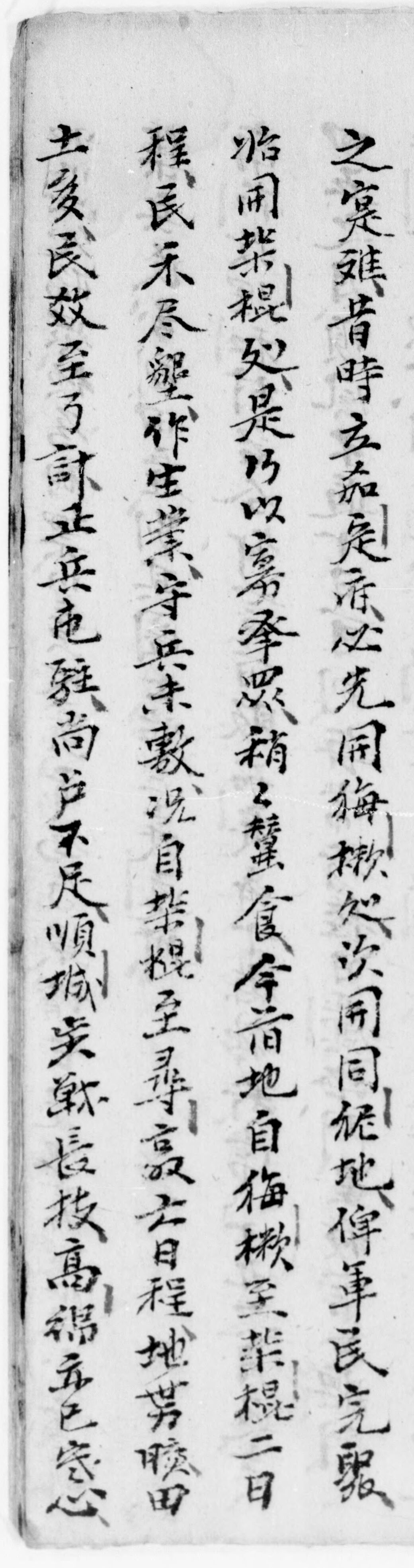
Sài Gòn 柴棍 written in Phủ biên tạp lục, a geography text written by Lê Quý Đôn. (From right to left, the second column [characters 3-4] marked by the line.)

The original toponym behind Sài Gòn, was attested earliest as 柴棍, with two phonograms whose Sino-Vietnamese readings are sài and côn respectively, in Lê Quý Đôn's Phủ biên tạp lục (撫邊雜錄 "Miscellaneous Chronicles of the Pacified Frontier", c. 1776), wherein Lê relates that, in 1674, Cambodian prince Ang Nan was installed as uparaja in 柴棍 (Sài Gòn) by Vietnamese forces.

柴棍 also appears later in Trịnh Hoài Đức's Gia Định thành thông chí (嘉定城通志 "Comprehensive Records about the Gia Định Citadel", c. 1820), Nam quốc địa dư giáo khoa thư (南國地輿教科書 "Textbook on the Geography of the Southern Country", 1908), etc.

Adrien Launay, in the chapter "Documents Historiques II: 1728 - 1771" of Histoire de la Mission de Cochinchine (1688−1823), cites 1747 documents containing the toponyms: provincia Rai-gon (for Sài Gòn), Rai-gon thong (for *Sài Gòn thượng "Upper Saigon"), & Rai-gon-ha (for *Sài Gòn hạ "Lower Saigon").

It is probably a transcription of Khmer ព្រៃនគរ (Prey Nokôr), or Khmer ព្រៃគរ (Prey Kôr).

This name may have originated from the many Bombax ceiba (kapok) trees that the Khmer people had planted around Prey Nôkôr, and which can still be seen at Cây Mai temple and surrounding areas. (Note: "Saigon, signifieraient bois des ouatiers, contenant ainsi une allysion aux nombreux kapokiers qui se rencontraient, parait-il, autregois dans la région. [...] Lê Van Phát avait cru pouvoir pousser cette interprétation très loin, et en déduire que là Plaine des Tombeaux avait été jadis une forêt inépuisable. [...] Sài Gòn pouvait être dérivé du nom cambodgien Prei Kor qui signigie fores des kapokiers (sic). Il pouvait être aussi l'adaptation des mots siamois Cai-ngon, c'est-àdire brousse des kapokiers, que les Laotiens emploient encore, affirmait-il, pour désigner la capitale de la Cochinchine." Hồng Sến Vương; Q. Thắng Nguyễn (2002). Tuyển tập Vương Hồng Sến (in Vietnamese). Nhà xuất bản Văn học. Archived from the original on 2010-05-05.) Another explanation is that the etymological meaning "twigs" (sài) and "boles" (gòn) refers to the dense and tall forest that once existed around the city, a forest to which the Khmer name, Prey Nokor, already referred.

===== Cantonese etymology =====
In Chinese, the city is referred to as 西貢, which is pronounced Sāigung in Cantonese and which 20th-century Vietnamese scholar Vương Hồng Sển proposed to be a transcription of Vietnamese Sài Gòn; (Note: Likely based on Southern Vietnamese pronunciation /ʂaːj˨˩ ɣɔŋ˨˩/) 西貢 is also pronounced Tây Cống in Sino-Vietnamese, Sai-kòng in Teochew, Xīgòng in Mandarin, etc. But 西貢 has never been written in Vietnamese records, only 柴棍 (Sài Gòn).

French officer Francis Garnier proposes that Sài Gòn's etymology is in the Cantonese name of Chợ Lớn (chữ Nôm: 𢄂𡘯), the Chinese district of Saigon. The Cantonese (and original) name of Cholon is "Tai-Ngon" (堤岸), which means "embankment" (French: quais). The theory posits that "Sài Gòn" derives from "Tai-Ngon". (Note: "Un siècle plus tard (1773), la révolte des TÁYON (sic) [qu'éclata] tout, d'abord dans les montagnes de la province de Qui-Nhon, et s'étendit repidement dans le sud, chassa de Bien-Hoa le mouvement commercial qu'y avaient attiré les Chinois. Ceux-ci abandonnèrent Cou-lao-pho, remontèrent de fleuve de Tan-Binh, et vinrent choisir la position actuele de CHOLEN. Cette création date d'envinron 1778. Ils appelèrent leur nouvelle résidence TAI-NGON ou TIN-GAN. Le nom transformé par les Annamites en celui de SAIGON fut depuis appliqué à tort, par l'expédition francaise, au SAIGON actuel dont la dénomination locale est BEN-NGHE ou BEN-THANH." Francis Garnier, quoted in: Vương Hồng Sển (1960). Sài Gòn Năm Xưa (PDF). pp. 34–35. Archived from the original (PDF) on 27 January 2023.) Vương (1960) favored this etymology. (Note: Vương Hồng Sển (1960). Sài Gòn Năm Xưa (PDF). pp. 34–35. Archived from the original (PDF) on 27 January 2023. quotes: "Cắt nghĩa 'Sài Gòn' do 'Thầy Ngồnn' của Tàu cũng thông và nghe lọt tai hơn! [...] Danh từ 'Đề Ngạn' (đọc giọng Tàu là Tai Ngòn, Tin Gan, Thầy Ngồnn) rất có thể là đầu mối đẻ ra hai chữ 'Sài Gòn'. " Rough translations: "The explanation that 'Sài Gòn' was from Chinese 'Thầy Ngồnn' sounds more straightforward and reasonable! [...] The noun [sic] 'Đề Ngạn' (in Chinese pronunciations: Tai Ngòn, Tin Gan, Thầy Ngồnn) was very likely the source of the two words 'Sài Gòn'.")

The proposal that Sài Gòn is from non-Sino-Vietnamese reading of Chinese 堤岸 tai4 ngon6 (“embankment”, SV: đê ngạn), the Cantonese name of Chợ Lớn, (e.g. by Garnier, 1866 and Vương, 1960) has been critiqued as folk-etymological, as:

- Sài Gòn's underlying toponym had been known to Vietnamese as early as 1674 and was then transcribed as 柴棍, which was preserved in Lê Quý Đôn's Phủ biên tạp lục (c. 1776), while, according to Garnier, the Chinese settlement Tai-ngon or Tin-gan (i.e. 堤岸 Đê Ngạn ~ Đề Ngạn) – known to Vietnamese as Chợ Lớn – was found in 1778;
- 堤岸 has variant form 提岸, thus suggesting that both were transcriptions of a local toponym and thus are cognates to, not originals of, Sài Gòn;
- Nam Quốc địa dư giáo khoa thư (南國地輿教科書) lists Chợ Lớn 𢄂𢀲 separately from 柴棍 Sài Gòn.

===== Thai etymology =====
According to Lê Van Phát, a Vietnamese military officer, a similar source for the name may have developed from the Thai words Cai-ngon, meaning "cotton bush" or "cotton plant". Lê stated that Laotians refer to Saigon as "Cai-ngon".

=== Gia Định ===
The name of Prey Nôkôr, along with Cambodia's rule over the area, remained until the 1690s, when Nguyễn Hữu Cảnh, a Vietnamese noble, was sent by the Nguyen rulers of Huế to establish Vietnamese administrative structures in the Mekong Delta and its surroundings. This act formally detached the area from Cambodia, which found itself too weak to intervene due to its ongoing conflict with Thailand. Prey Nôkôr was officially renamed Gia Định (chữ Hán: 嘉定), and the region was placed firmly under Vietnamese administrative control. With the city's capture by the French in 1859, the name Gia Định was discarded and replaced by the name "Saigon", which had always been the popular name. Most maps in Literary Sinitic were not updated to use the newer name until at least 1891, with the name of the city written as 嘉定 until then.

==== Etymology ====
The origin of the name Gia Định has not been firmly established. One possible etymology may relate to the Chinese characters used to spell the name in chữ Hán: 嘉, which means "joyful", "auspicious", or "pretty", and 定, which means "decide" or "pacify". Another possible etymology, based on the fact that Malay speakers existed in the region during the era of Vietnamese settlement, relates the name to the Malay words ya dingin or ya hering, meaning "cool and cold" or "cold and clear", respectively—perhaps referring to the appearance of the area's many waterways.

=== Thành phố Hồ Chí Minh ===
On August 27, 1946, Viet Minh's official newspaper Cứu Quốc (National Salvation) published the article Thành Phố SÀI-GÒN Từ Nay Sẽ Đổi Tên là thành phố HỒ-CHÍ-MINH (Saigon City is Now Renamed Ho Chi Minh City). This was the first time that proclaiming the city to be renamed after Hồ Chí Minh, the first leader of North Vietnam.

On July 2, 1976, upon the formal establishment of the modern-day Socialist Republic of Vietnam, the new government eventually renamed the city.

The official name is now Thành phố Hồ Chí Minh; Thành phố is the Vietnamese word for "city". In English, this is translated as Ho Chi Minh City; in French it is translated as Hô-Chi-Minh-Ville (the circumflex and hyphens are sometimes omitted). Due to its length, the name is often abbreviated or made into an acronym; "Tp. HCM" and the acronym "TPHCM" are used interchangeably in the original Vietnamese, along with "HCM City" or "HCMC" in English and "HCMV" in French. (Note: The official website of Ho Chi Minh City uses both "TP HCM" and "TPHCM" in Vietnamese, and uses mainly "HCM City" in English, though many linked articles (example 1, example 2) use "HCMC". The French acronym "HCMV" is less common, although it is used on the official website of the French consulate in Ho Chi Minh City.)

==== Etymology ====
As noted, the now-official name commemorates North Vietnamese leader Hồ Chí Minh, who, although deceased by the time of the Fall of Saigon, was instrumental in the establishment of the Socialist Republic of Vietnam. "Hồ Chí Minh" was not his original name; he was born as Nguyễn Sinh Cung, and only began using the new name around 1940. This name, which he favoured throughout his later years, combines a common Vietnamese surname (Hồ, 胡) with a given name meaning "enlightened will" (from Sino-Vietnamese 志明; Chí meaning 'will' (or spirit), and Minh meaning 'light'), in essence, meaning "bringer of light".

== Other names ==
The kingdom of Champa, though mainly based along the coast of the South China Sea, is known to have expanded west into the Mekong Delta. (Note: "Such a trading center was bound to be one of the prizes in the struggle for power that developed in the thirteenth century between the declining Khmer Empire and the expanding kingdom of Champa, and by the end of that century the Cham people had seized control of the town." Salkin, Robert M.; Ring, Trudy (1996). Schellinger, Paul E.; Robert M. Salkin (eds.). Asia and Oceania. International Dictionary of Historic Places. Vol. 5. Taylor & Francis. p. 353. ISBN 1-884964-04-4.) The Chams gave the city the name "Baigaur" (or "Bai Gaur"), which author Jacques Népote suggests may have been a simple adaptation of the Khmer name Prey Kôr; conversely, author Nghia M. Vo implies that a Cham presence existed in the area prior to Khmer occupation, and that the name Baigaur was given to the village that would later come to be known as Prey Nokor. (Note: "Saigon began as the Cham village of Baigaur, then became the Khmer Prey Nôkôr before being taken over by the Vietnamese and renamed Gia Dinh Thanh and then Saigon." Vo, Nghia M., ed. (2009). The Viet Kieu in America: Personal Accounts of Postwar Immigrants from Vietnam. McFarland & Co. p. 218. ISBN 9780786454907.)

== Controversy ==
=== Khmer nationalism ===
The area now known as Ho Chi Minh City was part of several historical empires connected to modern-day Cambodia, including Funan, Chenla and the Khmer Empire. Formal settlements by the Khmers likely date back to the 11th century. In comparison, the first Vietnamese presence in the area dates back to the late 15th century. The gradual encroachment of the Vietnamese onto what were once Khmer lands, culminating in the creation of the unified State of Vietnam in 1949 and the associated cession of Cochinchina (known to the Khmers as Kampuchea Krom, or "Lower Cambodia") to Vietnam has resulted in significant bitterness directed towards the Vietnamese on the part of the Khmers. As a result, many of those who consider themselves Khmer nationalists would refer to Ho Chi Minh City as Prey Nôkôr, a reference to its former status as a Khmer port city.

=== Overseas Vietnamese ===
Of the about 3 million Overseas Vietnamese, a majority left Vietnam as political refugees after 1975 as a result of the Fall of Saigon and the resulting takeover by the Communist regime, taking up residence in North America, Western Europe, and Australia. The majority are opposed to the existing government of Vietnam, and, in many cases, view Ho Chi Minh as a communist dictator who founded the Communist Party of Vietnam and was responsible for the deaths of many Vietnamese people. As a result, they generally do not recognize the name Ho Chi Minh City, and will only refer to the city as Saigon, the previous official name of the city.

== See also ==
- Ho Chi Minh City
- Names of Asian cities in different languages
- Little Saigon
