= Daoshi (disambiguation) =

A daoshi is a Taoist priest, monk, or master.

Daoshi may also refer to:

- Daoshi (Buddhist monk) (道世, died 683), a Buddhist monk who authored Fayuan Zhulin during the Tang dynasty
- Daoshi, Zhejiang (岛石), a town in Hangzhou, Zhejiang, China
