= Vietnamese tall ship Le Quy Don =

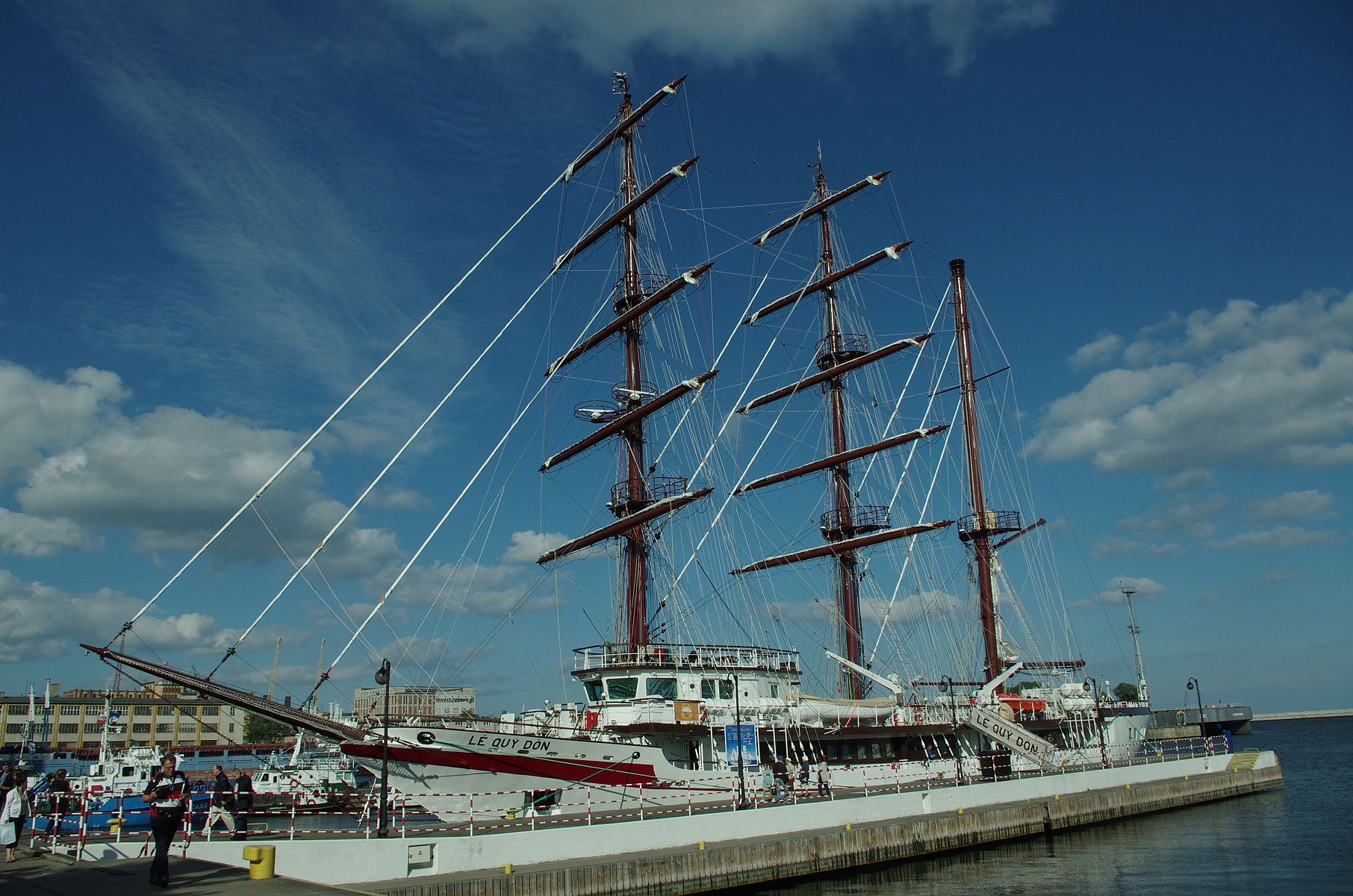
- Lê Quý Đôn

History

Vietnam
- Namesake: Lê Quý Đôn
- Owner: Vietnam People's Navy
- Builder: Marine Projects Ltd., Gdańsk
- Launched: June 2014
- Completed: June 2015
- Maiden voyage: 27. September 2015
- Home port: Nha Trang
- Identification: IMO number: 9728100; MMSI number: 574003480; Callsign: VN286
- Status: in active service

General characteristics
- Class & type: training ship
- Tonnage: 714 GT
- Displacement: 950 tons
- Length: 67 m (220 ft)
- Beam: 10 m (33 ft)
- Draught: 4 m (13 ft)
- Installed power: 880 kW (1196 hp)
- Propulsion: Sail, auxiliary diesel engine
- Sail plan: three-masted barque
- Speed: 12 knots (22 km/h; 14 mph) under power
- Endurance: 45 days
- Crew: 30 + 80 cadetts
- Armament: 4x remote controlled weapon stations for .50 cal (12.7mm) WKM-Bm machine guns

Sailing Vessel 286 – Lê Quý Đôn is a tall ship of the Vietnam People's Navy (Hải quân Nhân dân Việt Nam). She is named in honour of the Vietnamese philosopher Lê Quý Đôn (1726–1784). The maiden voyage with a mixed crew of Vietnamese and Polish sailors started on 27 September 2015 from Gdańsk to Nha Trang, where she is based now.

== The ship ==
The training ship was ordered in 2013 at Marine Projects Ltd. in Gdańsk, Poland. The vessel was designed by Polish naval architect Zygmunt Choreń, for Vietnam Navy, and built by the Marine Projects Ltd. Shipyard in Gdańsk, Poland. The three-masted barque is carrying 1400 m² sails made of synthetic materials, her hull is made of steel. She has a crew of 30 plus 80 cadets.

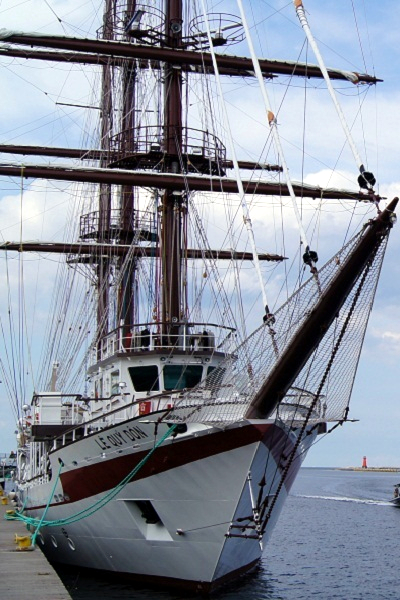
Lê Quý Đôn before the maiden voyage.
