= Mo (grist mill) =

Rotary millstone used in ancient China

Mo (Chinese: 磨; pinyin: mò; lit. 'mill') were stone implements used for grinding wheat in ancient China. It was a rotary quern millstone powered by a hand-operated crank fixed at the top to grind and pulverize grains, wheat, and rice into flour.

== History ==
The Chinese have been using quernstones since the Neolithic Age to grind wheat into flour but rotary stone mills would not appear in China until the Warring States period during the Zhou dynasty. The crank-connecting rod mechanism on the manually operated rotary quern would exemplify the earliest uses of crank mechanisms in Han China as well as signifying one of the world's earliest application of the crank and connecting rod, an achievement in the history of ancient mechanical technology.

Manually operated mills utilizing a crank-and-connecting rod were used in the Western Han dynasty. Revolving stone grist mills have been in use since the Han dynasty as they are mentioned several times in a number of times in the bamboo and wooden slip documents dating back to 102 BC. A reference to the mo is mentioned in the Book of Origins, a book dating back to the 2nd century BC, where it says: Gongshu zuo shiwei 公輸作石磑 "Gongshu invented the stone (rotary) mill". The Gujin Tushu Jicheng encyclopedia published in 1725 glosses this with a commentary stating:

He made a plaiting of bamboo which he filled with clay (ni 泥), to decorticate grain and produce hulled rice; this was called wei 磑 (actually long 礱). He also chiseled out stones which he placed one on top of the other, to grind hulled rice and wheat to produce flour; this was called mo (磨).

== See also ==
- Gristmill
