= Shiben =

Early Chinese encyclopedia

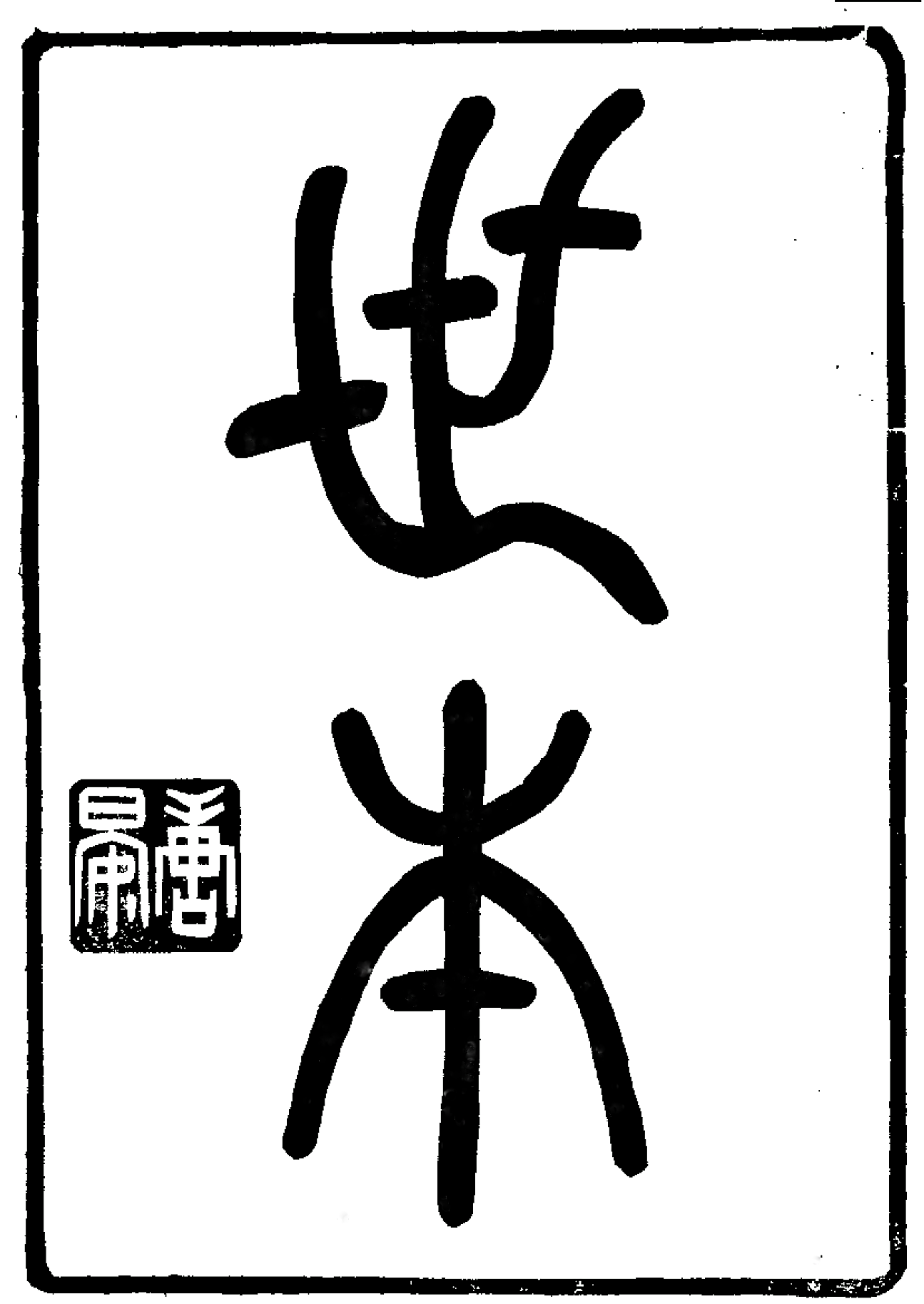
- Shiben title page in Small Seal Script

Chinese name
- Chinese: 世本
- Literal meaning: Generation Origins
Transcriptions
Standard Mandarin
- Hanyu Pinyin: Shìběn
- Wade–Giles: Shih-pen
Yue: Cantonese
- Jyutping: Sai^{3}bun^{5}
Southern Min
- Hokkien POJ: Sìpún
Middle Chinese
- Middle Chinese: Syejpwon
Old Chinese
- Baxter–Sagart (2014): Ḷap-spˤə[n]ʔ

Korean name
- Hangul: 세본
- Hanja: 世本
Transcriptions
- Revised Romanization: Sebon
- McCune–Reischauer: Sebon

Japanese name
- Kanji: 世本
- Hiragana: せほん
Transcriptions
- Revised Hepburn: Sehon

The Shiben or Book of Origins (Chinese: 世本; pinyin: shìběn; lit. 'Generation Origins') was an early Chinese encyclopedia which recorded imperial genealogies from the mythical Three Sovereigns and Five Emperors down to the late Spring and Autumn period (771–476 BCE), explanations of the origin of clan names, and records of legendary and historical Chinese inventors. It was written during the 2nd century BC at the time of the Han dynasty. The work was lost in the 10th century, but partially reconstructed from quotations during the Qing dynasty.

== Title ==
The title combines the common Chinese words shì 世 "generation; epoch; hereditary; world" and běn 本 "root; stem; origin; fundament; wooden tablet".

The personal name of Emperor Taizong of Tang (r. 627–650) was Shimin 世民, and owing to the strict naming taboo against writing an emperor's name, the Shiben 世本 title was changed to Xiben 系本 or Daiben 代本 (with the shi near-synonyms of xi 系 "system; series; family" and dai 代 "substitute; generation; dynasty").

Although this Chinese title is usually transliterated Shiben, Shih-pen, etc., English translations include Book of Origins and Generational Records.

== History ==
The origins of the Shiben text are obscure. The earliest references to it date from the Han dynasty (206 BCE – 220 CE). The (111 CE) Book of Han bibliography section (Yiwenzhi ) has a list of Warring States period (475–221 BCE) texts including the Shiben in 15 volumes (pian). The (5th century) Book of the Later Han says Sima Qian used the text as a source for his (109 BCE) Records of the Grand Historian. Several Han scholars wrote commentaries to the Shiben, namely Liu Xiang (77–6 BCE), Song Jun 宋均 (d. 76 CE), Ying Shao (140–206), and Song Zhong 宋衷 (fl. 192–210), which was the most widely copied in later editions.

The bibliography sections of the standard Twenty-Four Histories list various Shiben versions from the Han up through the Tang dynasty (618–907), but it was lost at the beginning of the Song dynasty (960–1279). During the Qing dynasty (1644–1911), scholars collected Shiben fragments and compiled eight different versions, which were published together. The eight compilers were Wang Mo, Sun Fengyi 孫馮翼, Chen Qirong 陳其榮, Qin Jiamo 秦嘉謨, Zhang Peng 張澎, Lei Xueqi 雷學淇. Mao Panlin 茆泮林, and Wang Zicai 王梓材. With the exception of Wang Zicai's version that rearranged the text in chronological order, the others all have three similar chapters (pian) on Shixing 氏姓 "Clan names", Ju 居 "Residences [of Rulers]", and Zuo 作 "Inventors"; but different arrangements of noble genealogies.

The Shiben was the oldest book in the Chinese literary genre of books that record inventions and discoveries, called "technological dictionaries", "dictionaries of origins" or "encyclopedias of origins". These Chinese reference works were important to the study of natural history.

This was the genre of lexical works devoted entirely to explaining the origins of things, inventions, customs and affairs—very characteristic of Chinese literature but liable to be puzzling to any Westerners who still cherish the illusion that that civilisation was 'timeless' and 'static'. In fact, it was historical to the core, conscious also of a kind of social evolution from primitive existence, and therefore very much concerned with origins.

The Sui dynasty mathematician Liu Xiaosun 劉孝孫 (fl. 605–616) wrote the Shishi 事始 "Beginning of all Affairs", which contains some 335 entries with names of various material things and devices. It was followed by the (c. 960) Xushishi 續事始 "Continued Beginning of all Affairs" by the Former Shu dynasty scholar Ma Jian 馬鑑, with 358 entries. Both of these books refer to Chinese legendary inventors. Later encyclopedias of origins in this genre were much larger. Two from the Song dynasty were the (1085) Shiwu jiyuan 事物紀原 "Records of the Origins of Affairs and Things" compiled by Gao Cheng 高承, and the (1237) Gujin yuanliu zhilun 古今源流至論 "Essays on the Course of Things from Antiquity to the Present Time", which was started by Lin Dong 林駧 and completed by Huang Lüweng 黃履翁. The Qing dynasty scholar Chen Yuanlong 陳元龍 produced the largest encyclopedia of origins, the (1717) Gezhi jingyuan 格致鏡元 "Mirror of Scientific and Technological Origins".

== Content ==
A page from a reconstructed Shiben from the Qing dynasty

Modern researchers continue to use information from the ancient Shiben. For instance, Chinese zupu "genealogy books" cite information from its elaborate genealogies of the ruling houses and the origins of clan names.

The early history of science and technology in China regularly cites Shiben records about names of the legendary, semi-legendary, and historical inventors of all kinds of devices, instruments, and machines. The textual entries for naming inventors are mostly gnomic 4-character lines, for instance, Bo Yi zuojing 伯益作井 "Bo Yi invented well(-digging)" [to help control the Great Flood]; Hu Cao zuoyi 胡曹作衣 "Hu Cao invented clothing"; and Li Shou zuoshu 隸首作數 "Li Shou invented computations". Since many of these inventors were allegedly ministers of the legendary Yellow Emperor, the value of the Shiben is not for the actual history of science, but for the systematization that it brings to the body of legendary technological lore.

The Zhou dynasty Chinese inventor Lu Ban or Gongshu Pan (507–440 BCE) and the rotary hand quern provides a good example. It stated that Gongshu zuo shiwei 公輸作石磑 "Gongshu invented the stone (rotary) mill" and the Gujin Tushu Jicheng written in 1725 glosses this with a commentary from the Shihwu zhiyuan encyclopedia.

He made a plaiting of bamboo which he filled with clay (ni 泥), to decorticate grain and produce hulled rice; this was called wei 磑 (actually long 礱). He also chiseled out stones which he placed one on top of the other, to grind hulled rice and wheat to produce flour; this was called mo (磨).
