= Huanglan =

Chinese leishu, completed in 222

Chinese name
- Traditional Chinese: 皇覽
- Simplified Chinese: 皇览
- Literal meaning: Imperial Mirror
Transcriptions
Standard Mandarin
- Hanyu Pinyin: Huánglǎn
- Wade–Giles: Huang-lan
Yue: Cantonese
- Jyutping: Wong^{4}laam^{5}
Southern Min
- Hokkien POJ: Hônglám
Old Chinese
- Baxter–Sagart (2014): [ɢ]ʷˤaŋkˁram

Korean name
- Hangul: 皇覽
- Hanja: 황람
Transcriptions
- McCune–Reischauer: Hwangram

Japanese name
- Kanji: 皇覽
- Hiragana: おうらん
Transcriptions
- Revised Hepburn: Ōran

The Huanglan or Imperial Mirror was one of the oldest Chinese leishu encyclopedias, compiled by the Cao Wei dynasty on the order of its founding emperor Cao Pi (Emperor Wen). Compilation started in 220 and was completed in 222. The purpose of the Huanglan was to provide the emperor and ministers of state with conveniently arranged summaries of all that was known at the time. Complete versions of the Huanglan existed until the Song dynasty, when it became a mostly lost work, although some fragments did survive in other encyclopedias and anthologies. The Huanglan was the prototype of the classified encyclopedia and served as a model for later ones such as the Tang dynasty's Encyclopedia of Literary Collections (624) and the Ming dynasty's Yongle Encyclopedia (1408).

== Title ==
The title combines huáng 皇 "emperor; imperial" and lǎn 覽 "see; look at; watch; inspect; display" (compare the Taiping Yulan encyclopedia). This character 覽 redundantly combines jiàn 見 "‘see" and the phonetic element jiān 監 < Old Chinese *kˁram "see; look at; inspect", which was an ancient graphic variant character for jiàn < *kˁram-s 鑑 or 鑒 "mirror", cognate with jìng 鏡 *qraŋ-s "mirror".

Five centuries before the title Huanglan first occurred, but the words huang (before it meant "emperor") and lan co-occur in the Chuci poem Li Sao "Encountering Sorrow", believed to be written by Qu Yuan (c. 340-278 BCE). The 1st line establishes the poet's noble ancestry from Zhuanxu, the legendary Yellow Emperor's grandson, the 2nd describes his auspicious birth, and the 3rd line says, "My father, seeing the aspect of my nativity (皇覽揆余初度兮), Took omens to give me an auspicious name". In this context, huang 皇 means "august; stately; revered" in reference to the poet's father and lan 覽 means "see".

The "mirror" meaning of the Chinese lan in Huanglan parallels the Medieval genre of speculum literature that aimed to encompass encyclopedic knowledge in a single work (e.g., Albertus Magnus's Speculum astronomiae), and the modern scholarly survey article that summarizes a field of knowledge.

Although the title is usually transliterated Huanglan or Huang Lan, some English translations are:

- Imperial Speculum
- The Imperial Survey
- Book for the Emperors
- Emperor's mirror
- Imperial Anthology

== History ==
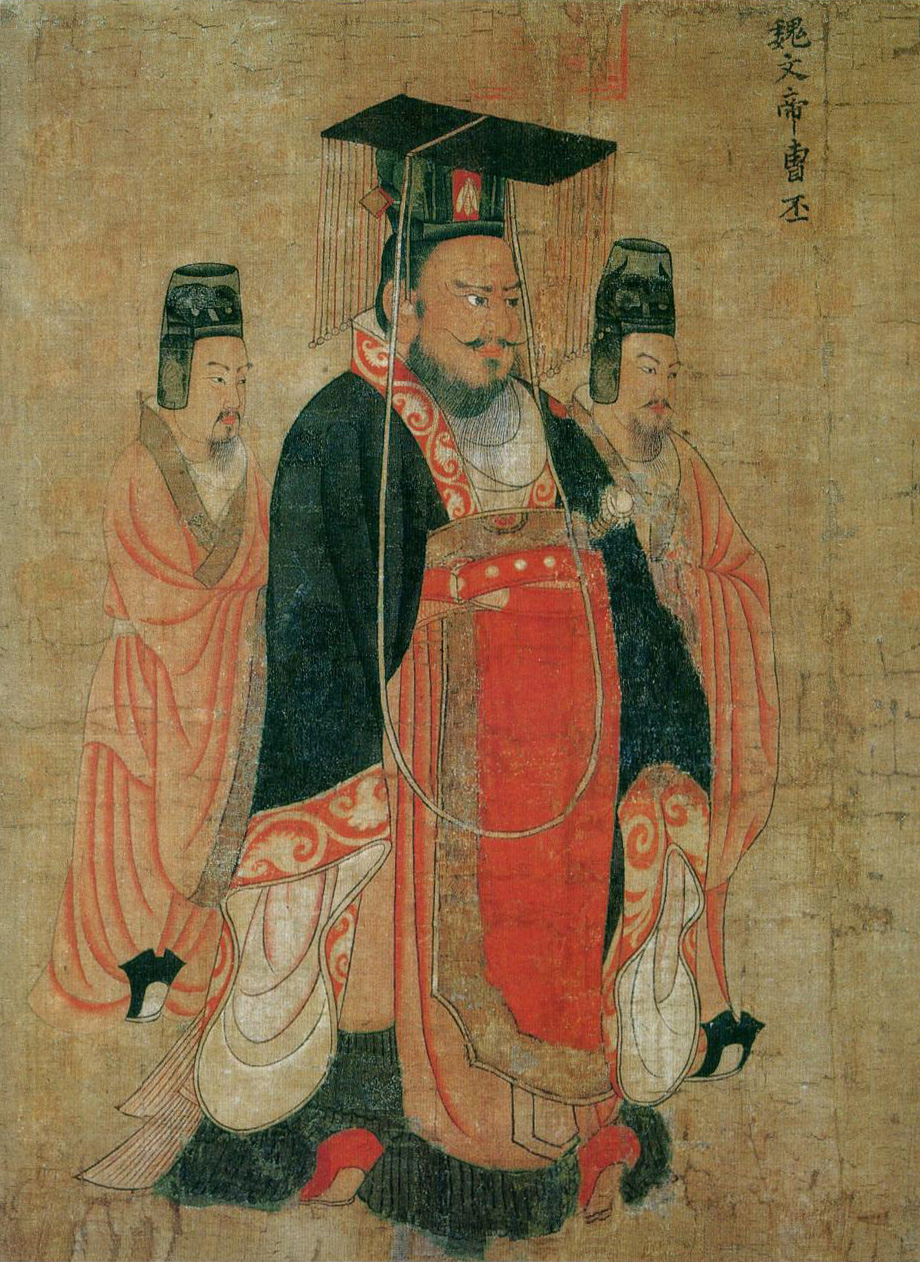
A painting of Cao Pi and two ministers, by the Tang dynasty artist Yan Liben

Beginning with the 3rd-century Huanglan, the first Chinese "encyclopedia" genre was the "imperial florilegium" that compiled excerpts from other writings and arranged them under appropriate headings for the convenience of the emperor and his ministers. Chinese traditional leishu encyclopedias differ from Western encyclopedias in that they consist almost entirely of selected quotations from written sources and arranged by a set of categories, the name encyclopedia having been applied to them because they embrace the whole realm of knowledge.

The emperor summoned a group of Confucian scholars to compile a completely new type of reference work that would provide the emperor and his ministers with a quick source for finding moral and political precedents. The chief editor Mou Xi 繆襲 (186-245) collaborated with Liu Shao, Huan Fan, Wang Xiang 王象, Wei Dan 韋誕, and other scholars.

Cao Pi instructed his officials to collect all the available classical philosophical texts and their commentaries, and to arrange them in suilei xiangcong 隨類相從 "successive categories". The Huanglan compilers adopted the macrostructure of the (c. 3rd century BCE) Erya dictionary with explicitly labelled sections, the microstructure of the (c. 239 BCE) Lüshi Chunqiu. The original Huanglan was divided into over 40 sections and comprised over 1000 chapters.

During the Six dynasties period (222-589), a number of works like the Huanglan were compiled, including the (c. 530) Liang dynasty Hualin bianlue 華林遍略 "An Arrangement of the Whole Company of Flowers" by Xu Mian 徐勉 and (c. 550) Northern Qi Xiuwendian yulan 修文殿御覽 "Imperial Speculum of the Hall of the Cultivation of Literature" Both of these were lost. Between the 3rd and 18th centuries, some 600 leishu were compiled, of which only 200 are still extant.

The textual history of the Huanglan is recorded in the bibliography sections of the standard Twenty-Four Histories. The (636) Book of Sui bibliography 經籍志 section records Huanglan 皇覽 editions in a 120-chapter version edited by Moui Xi 繆襲 and others, a Liang dynasty 680-chapter version, a 123-chapter version by the astronomer He Chengtian 何承天, and a 50-chapter version by Xu Yuan 徐爰. It also records the lost 4-chapter Huanglanmu 皇覽目 index, and the 12-chapter Huanglan chao (皇覽抄) revised by Prince Xiao Chen (蕭琛). The (945) Old Book of Tang bibliography (經籍下) records a 122-chapter version by He Chengtian, and an 84-chapter one by Xu Yuan. Subsequent standard histories do not record the Huanglan. By the year 1000, during the Northern Song dynasty, the complete version of Huanglan was definitively known to be lost.

Several Qing dynasty (1644-1911) scholars collected surviving fragments of the lost encyclopedia (e.g., the Commentary on the Water Classic quotes it 15 times). For example, Huang Shi 黃奭's Wei Huanglan 魏皇覽 and Wang Mo's Huanglan yili 皇覽逸禮.
