= Encyclopedia of China Publishing House =

Publishing company in China

The Encyclopedia of China Publishing House (simplified Chinese: 中国大百科全书出版社; traditional Chinese: 中國大百科全書出版社; pinyin: Zhōngguó Dà Bǎikēquánshū Chūbǎn Shè) is a publishing company in China. It was established in Beijing on November 18, 1978.

The Publishing House publishes the Encyclopedia of China (中国大百科全书) and the Chinese version of the Encyclopædia Britannica.

== Organization ==
The editorial agencies under the China Encyclopedia Publishing House include the China Encyclopedia Electronic Audiovisual Publishing House, the Knowledge Publishing House, the Science and Technology Branch, the Social Sciences and Humanities Branch, the Children's Encyclopedia Branch, the Education Branch, the Academic Works Branch, the Encyclopedia Compilation Center, the Professional Encyclopedia Regional Encyclopedia Compilation Center, the Foreign Cooperation Center, the Encyclopedia Terminology Center, and the Art Design Center. It can be engaged in the publication of various professional books, educational books, popular books, and cross-media, multimedia publications and online publications.

China Encyclopedia Publishing House has nearly 500 employees, including nearly 200 editors and publishers, and the professional knowledge of the editors covers almost all fields of modern science and culture.

China Encyclopedia Publishing House has a comprehensive office building with an area of 18,800 square meters, an advanced computer editing area, a library with a rich collection of books, a well-equipped encyclopedia terminology center, and a complete range of auxiliary facilities, which can provide a full range of services for editing, publishing and distribution. It has the right to publish foreign trade and can engage in the import and export business of various publications around the world.

== See also ==
- Publishing industry in China
