= Encyclopedia of China =

Chinese language encyclopedia

- Language: Chinese
- Subject: General
- Genre: Reference encyclopedia
- Publisher: Encyclopedia of China Publishing House
- Publication date: 1978–present
- Publication place: People's Republic of China
- Media type: 74 hardback volumes
- ISBN: 978-7-5000-7958-3

The Encyclopedia of China (simplified Chinese: 中国大百科全书; traditional Chinese: 中國大百科全書; pinyin: Zhōngguó Dà Bǎikēquánshū; lit. 'Great Encyclopedia of China') is the first large-entry modern encyclopedia in the Chinese language. The compilation began in 1978. Published by the Encyclopedia of China Publishing House, the encyclopedia was issued one volume at a time, beginning in 1980 with a volume on astronomy; the final volume was completed in 1993. It comprised 74 volumes, with more than 80,000 entries. Arranged by subject, which numbered 66 (some subjects occupy more than one volume), within each subject, entries were arranged by pinyin as many modern Chinese dictionaries have been. A Uyghur language edition was also published in 2015.

A CD-ROM version and a subscription-based online version are also available. A second and more concise edition of the work was published in 2009.

The third online edition was released and published in the end of 2018, which is free to use. More than 20,000 scholars participated in this online encyclopaedia program which started in 2011, including some experts from Chinese Academy of Sciences. The encyclopedia has more than 300,000 entries.

== See also ==
- Chinese encyclopedia
