= Chinese Encyclopedia =

Modern Chinese encyclopedia

The Chinese Encyclopedia (simplified Chinese: 中华百科全书; traditional Chinese: 中華百科全書; pinyin: Zhōnghuá Bǎikēquánshū) is a modern Chinese encyclopedia. It was published in the Republic of China (Taiwan) from 1981 until 1983. It comprises 10 volumes and 38 categories, with more than 15,000 entries. Most of the editors were from the Chinese Culture University and the China Academy (simplified Chinese: 中华学术院; traditional Chinese: 中華學術院; pinyin: Zhōnghuá Xuéshùyuàn) in Taiwan. An online version was published in 1999.

== See also ==
- Chinese Wikipedia
