= Shishi Leiyuan =

Chinese encyclopaedia written in 1145

- Traditional Chinese: 事實類苑
- Simplified Chinese: 事实类苑
- Literal meaning: Categorized garden of truth
Transcriptions
Standard Mandarin
- Hanyu Pinyin: Shìshí Lèiyuàn
- Wade–Giles: Shih^{4}-shih^{2} lei^{4}-yüan^{4}

Huang Song Shishi Leiyuan
- Traditional Chinese: 皇宋事實類苑
- Simplified Chinese: 皇宋事实类苑
- Literal meaning: Categorized garden of truth from the imperial Song dynasty
Transcriptions
Standard Mandarin
- Hanyu Pinyin: Huáng Sòng Shìshí Lèiyuàn
- Wade–Giles: Huang^{2} Sung^{4} shih^{4}-shih^{2} lei^{4}-yüan^{4}

Song Chao Leiyuan
- Traditional Chinese: 宋朝類苑
- Simplified Chinese: 宋朝类苑
- Literal meaning: Categorized garden from the Song dynasty
Transcriptions
Standard Mandarin
- Hanyu Pinyin: Sòng Cháo Lèiyuàn
- Wade–Giles: Sung^{4} Ch'ao^{2} lei^{4}-yüan^{4}

Huang Chao Leiyuan
- Traditional Chinese: 皇朝類苑
- Simplified Chinese: 皇朝类苑
- Literal meaning: Categorized garden from the imperial dynasty
Transcriptions
Standard Mandarin
- Hanyu Pinyin: Huáng Cháo Lèiyuàn
- Wade–Giles: Huang^{2} Ch'ao^{2} lei^{4}-yüan^{4}

The Huang Song Shishi Leiyuan, better known today as Shishi Leiyuan, but also known as Huang Chao Leiyuan or Song Chao Leiyuan, is an 1145 Chinese encyclopedia (leishu) written by the official Jiang Shaoyu when he was the prefect of Ji Prefecture. Jiang organized his materials into 28 topics. Especially valuable today are the sections on Northern Song dynasty political history, since many of the (more than 50) books he sourced are no longer extant.

== Contents ==
The existing version contains 78 chapters (the original text probably consists of 63 chapters).

- Ch. 1-5: "Venerated instructions of ancestors" (祖宗聖訓)
- Ch. 6-7: "Favoring encounters of monarchs and ministers" (君臣知遇)
- Ch. 8-12: "Deeds by eminent ministers" (名臣事蹟)
- Ch. 13-14: "Virtues and wisdom" (德量智識)
- Ch. 15-16: "Communicating in government" (顧問奏對)
- Ch. 17-18: "Sincere advice and memorials" (忠言讜論)
- Ch. 18-20: "Canonical rites and music" (典禮音律)
- Ch. 21-23: "Administration and government" (官政治績)
- Ch. 24: "Official costume and ceremonies" (衣冠盛事)
- Ch. 25-28: "Government offices and etiquette" (官職儀制)
- Ch. 29-31: "Literati and books" (詞翰書籍)
- Ch. 32-33: "Evolution of tradition" (典故沿革)
- Ch. 34-40: "Poetry" (詩歌賦詠)
- Ch. 41: "Prose literature and pianwen" (文章四六)
- Ch. 42-43: "Immortals and hermits" (曠達隱逸)
- Ch. 44-45: "The religious, Buddhists and Taoists" (仙釋僧道)
- Ch. 46-48: "Dream interpretation" (休祥夢兆)
- Ch. 49-50: "Fortune telling and medicine" (占相醫藥)
- Ch. 51-52: "Techniques in calligraphy and fine arts" (書畫伎藝)
- Ch. 53-54: "Loyal and honorable deeds" (忠義節義)
- Ch. 55-56: "Talented military leaders" (將帥才略)
- Ch. 57: "Recommending talents for promotion" (知人薦舉)
- Ch. 58-59: "To broaden one's knowledge" (廣知博識), trivial knowledge
- Ch. 60-62: "Miscellaneous (local) cultures" (風俗雜志)
- Ch. 63-67: "Jokes and pranks" (談諧戲謔)
- Ch. 68-69: "Spirits and supernatural phenomena" (神異幽怪)
- Ch. 70-74: "Lies and blunders" (詐妄謬誤)
- Ch. 75-78: "Safeguarding borders and suppressing bandits" (安邊御寇)
