= Phủ biên tạp lục =

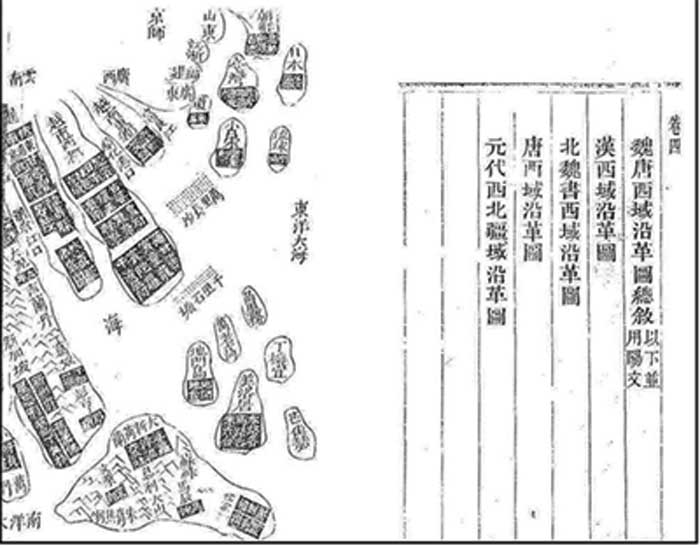
The Paracel Islands in Phủ biên tạp lục

The Phủ biên tạp lục (chữ Hán: 撫邊雜錄 Miscellaneous Chronicles of the Pacified Frontier 1776) is a 6 volume Classical Chinese geography by the Vietnamese Confucian scholar and encyclopaedist Lê Quý Đôn.

It is a detailed description of the Nguyễn dynasty's territories in Thuận Hóa and Quảng Nam provinces, and covers outlying areas such as the Spratly Islands and Paracel Islands. This text was written in the aftermath of the Trịnh regime's invasion of the long-autonomous Nguyễn territories, which took place in 1774. The Lê court sent Lê Quý Đôn into the newly captured territories to carry out a survey of its natural resources and economic potential, and this text is a result of his research. It represents one of the most important historical sources for understanding the geographical and historical conditions of central Việt Nam in the second half of the eighteenth century. The original Chinese text was translated into modern romanized Vietnamese (quốc ngữ) by the noted twentieth-century historian Đào Duy Anh.
