= Wenyuan Yinghua =

Chinese anthology

- Traditional Chinese: 文苑英華
- Simplified Chinese: 文苑英华
- Literal meaning: literary flowers brilliant blossoms
Transcriptions
Standard Mandarin
- Hanyu Pinyin: Wényuàn Yīnghuá

Wenyuan Yinghua
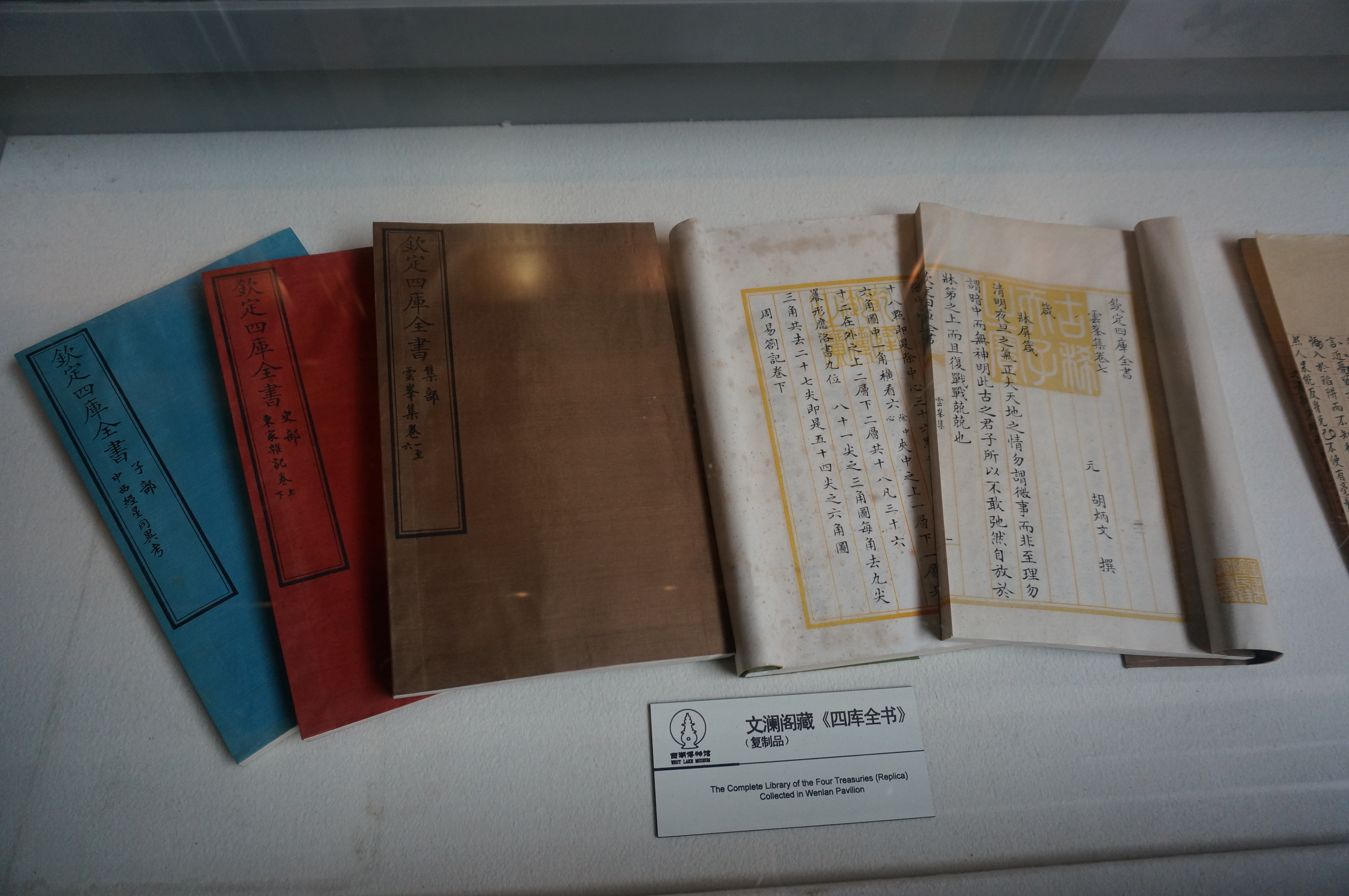
- Editors: Song Bai, Zhou Bida, Xu Xuan and other imperial scholars
- Authors: Bai Juyi, Du Fu and other poets and writers
- Language: Chinese (Han characters)
- Genre: Poems and lyrics
- Publisher: Song imperial editorial
- Publication date: 986 A.D.
- Publication place: China
- Media type: Book

The Wenyuan Yinghua (Chinese: 文苑英華), sometimes translated as Finest Blossoms in the Garden of Literature, is an anthology of poetry, odes, songs and writings from the Liang dynasty to the Five Dynasties era.

Wenyuan Yinghua is a showreel of literature from around the Song dynasty. The book was initially compiled by a team of officers including Song Bai (宋白), Hu Meng (扈蒙), and Xu Xuan (徐鉉) under an imperial order from 982 to 986 during the Northern Song dynasty. Southern Song scholar Zhou Bida printed the book at last in 1204, while four extensive alterations and countless minor revisions were put forth in the extent of the past 200 years. Wenyuan Yinghua is divided into 1,000 volumes and 38 genera by sections with 19,102 pieces of works written by about 2,200 authors; much of the crucial compilation of the writings came from the Tang dynasty scholars. It is considered one of the Four Great Books of Song.

Despite this, Wenyuan Yinghua has a massive amount of valuable content regarding Chinese history and literature; this work has been mostly neglected by scholars in both the East and West since the book was composed and printed. It has an extensive association with other Tang and Song Chinese literary anthologies.

== The compilation of Wenyuan Yinghua ==
The compilation started in the early years of the Song dynasty. The ruling family of Song, the Zhao family, seized power to the throne by conducting a coup d'état on the former Zhou dynasty. Song faces threats from the north and south in its early years. The founding emperor of Song wants to secure his place and increase the legitimacy of his reign by leaving a mark in literature. Thus, he started the compilation of Wenyuan Yinghua.

The compilers, led by Zhou Bida, come from all over China. Among the leading officials of the project, Xu Xuan comes from Guiji. He newly surrendered to Song after the fall of Nan Tang, where he was a court poet there. Wu Shu came from Danyang, and Lü Wenzhong was born in Xin'an, Hebei. The whole picture is that the emperor wants every talent in every background and birth to attribute to the compilation.

The compilation of Wenyuan Yinghua lasted for several emperors in Song, during which emperors had a significant impact on the selection of work. Emperor Taizong of Song enlisted several Song poems he preferred in Wenyuan Yinghua. He also appointed the chief editor personally to make sure only the literature work of the best quality is composed. Emperor Zhenzong showed a similar attitude toward the work.

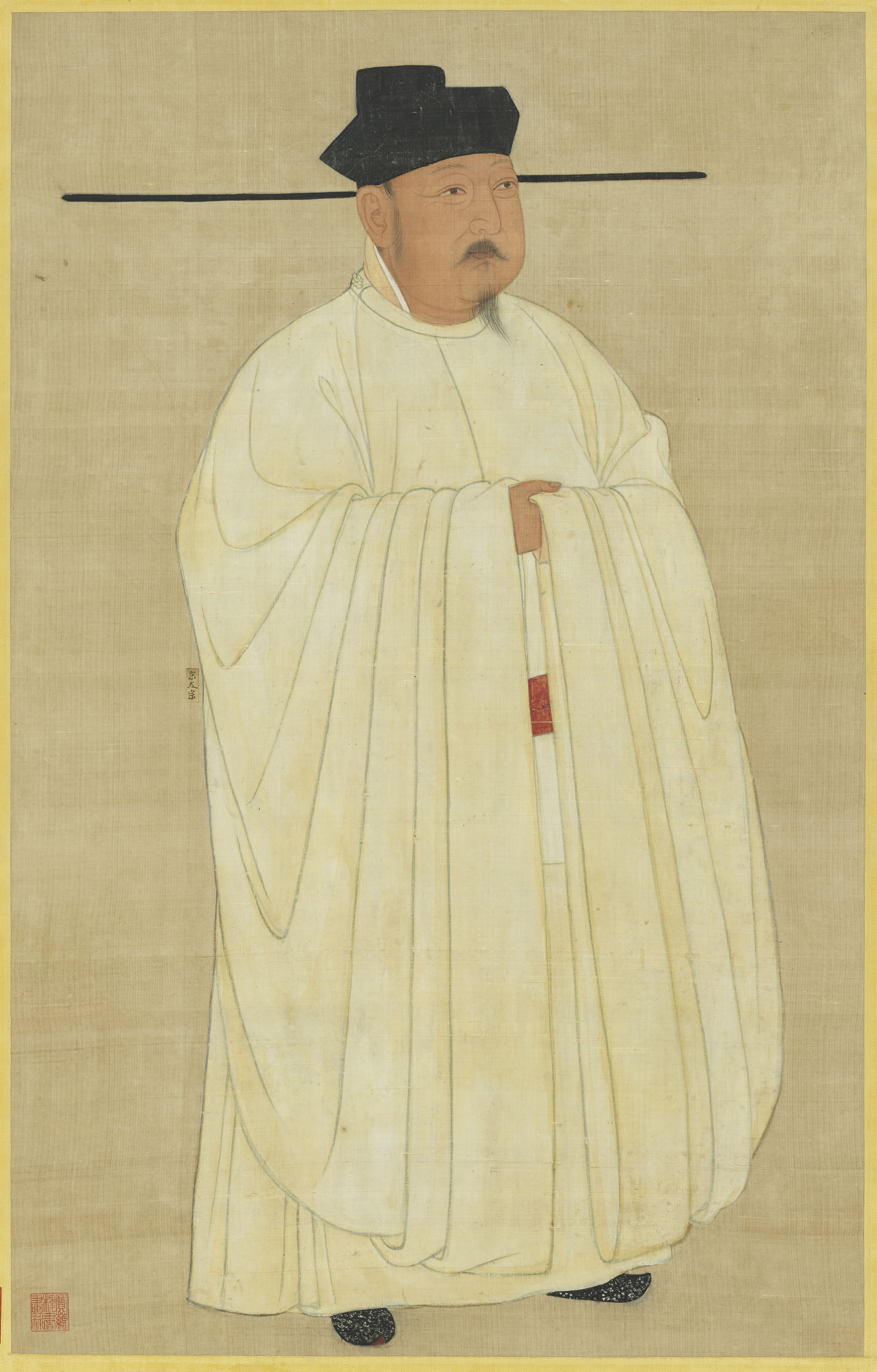
Emperor Song taizong initiated the compilation of Wenyuan Yinghua

This influence from emperors made Wenyuan Yinghua biased towards emphasizing the importance of the emperor and the good deed they have done, acting as propaganda to justify the right of imperial autocracy.

== Literacy techniques and genres ==
Wenyuan Yinghua includes literature of all forms, including poems, lyrics, and articles. These writings cover a wide range of topics, from the story of a heroic act to the poet's philosophical emotion about an object.

=== Poems, songs, hymns ===
Poems and songs are famous types of literature genres in the Tang and Song dynasties. They have different names in Chinese, such as "Fu", "Shi", "Ci", "Yuefu Shi", and "Jue Ju". They are all types of poems, but each represents different poetic composition rules and forms.

Many of the works of the highest regard in Wenyuan Yinghua combine the writer's description of events and the expression of opinions. The writers usually start describing an event or object in the first few lines and carry on to expressing their ideas deriving from the event.

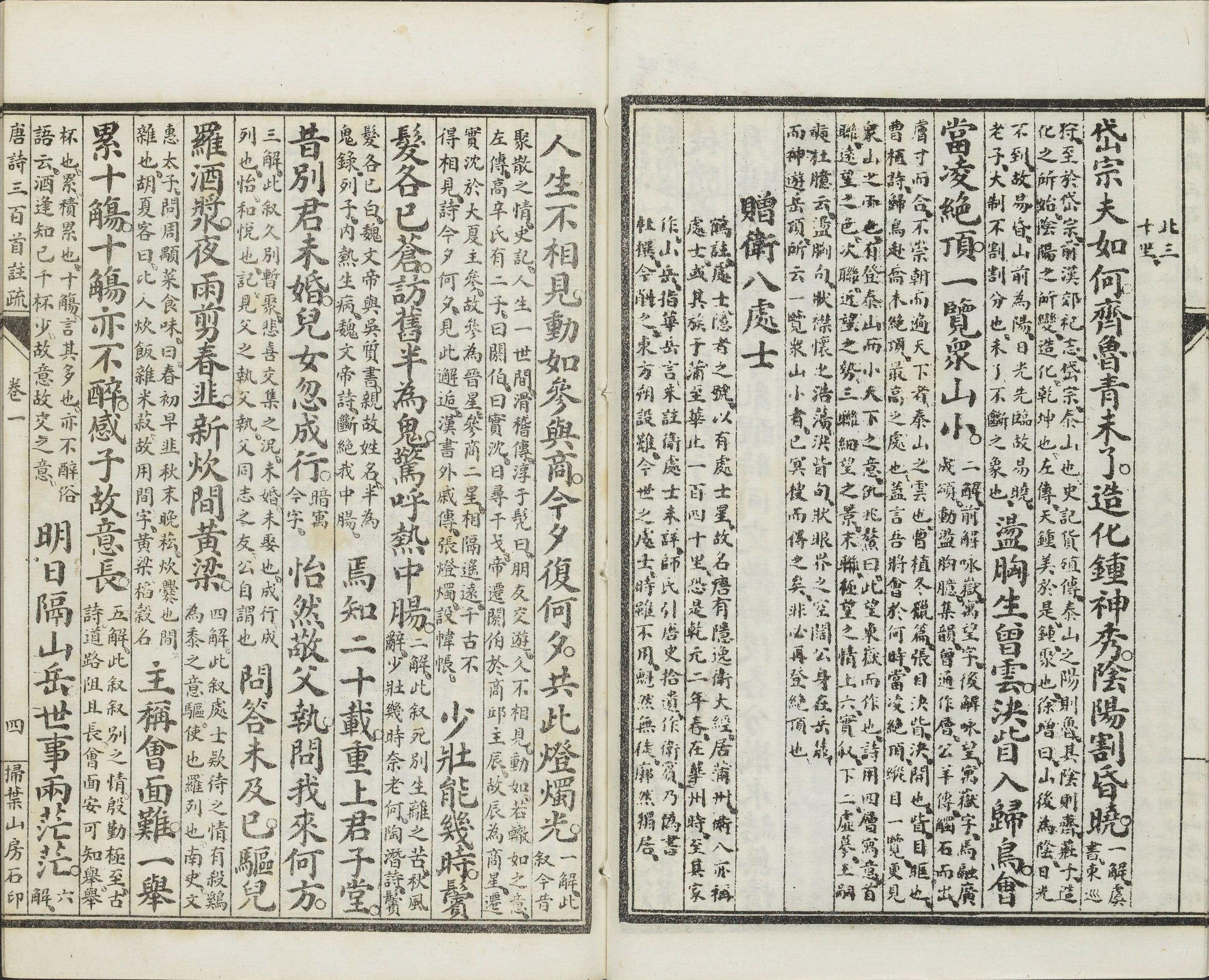
Tang poems are written on papers in this format

The poems in Wenyuan Yinghua come with a lot of quotations. It is a way for writers to show their erudition to audiences, majorly fellow writers with certain cultural attainment. The work they quoted could be Chinese classics dating further back, such as "Zhuang Zi", "Zuo Zhuan", or "Lun Yu". Those examples listed are all classics required for Chinese scholars to memorize for the imperial exam, so the audience would not have problems understanding the quoted reference. In "酬乐天扬州初逢席上见赠," the verse "到乡翻似烂柯人" literally means "as if I'm the man carrying a broken ax after I return home." The quotation "the man carrying a broken ax" comes from a story in "Jing shu" (The history of Jing). The story tells a man who went chopping the woods in the forest, and when he gets back home, he discovers everything has changed. A few years have passed in his few days in the woods. By quoting this, the author Bai Juyi expresses the shocking emotion that everything moved forth while he was away from home.

Some authors use symbolism to present the work in depth. For instance, Du Fu's poem "Li Ren Xin" included a detailed description of the banquet in the palace. Although it seemed to be depicting the scene, Du implies the extravagant lifestyle of nobles is built on the hardship of ordinary people, secretly conveying discontent. Those works have a market among ordinary citizens while spreading unnoticed by authorities.

Symbolism is prevalent in Wenyuan Yinghua's poems. Like many western poets like Shakespeare, Emily Dickinson, and E. E. Cummings, their middle-aged colleagues in China also have keen sights of their surroundings. Poets in Tang and Song left comments on the tenancy of nature, praising the firmness and persistence of bamboos and orchids. They were lit up by the lone plum in the snow and astounded by the pines growing from rocks. They learned from the cruelness and beauty of nature. The authors polish their works, illustrating traits of good virtue vividly with symbolism.

Poems in Wenyuan Yinghua include many analogies and metaphors. Since lyrics come in verses of seven Chinese characters, poets need to express as efficiently as possible in limited space. Metaphors and analogy serve the purpose of saving words of description here since they use the commonly known character of one object to describe another lesser-known thing.

=== Other forms of literature ===
Wenyuan Yinghua included other literary forms such as narrative tales and stories. Some works are articles or even bibliographies by poets describing the achievement in their life.

A type of story worthy of note is "Zhi guai," stories about ghosts and supernatural phenomena. It was popular in Song society, combining myth and legends with writers' creations. The type led to the trend of stories in Song and eventually developed into novels about "Zhi guai" in later dynasties.

The literature forms other than poems in Wenyuan Yinghua are much less famous than poems and little studied.

== Literary subjects ==
=== Imperial examination ===
Throughout the song dynasty, the only way for a citizen to get promoted to become an official was through "imperial examination." The "imperial examination" selects officials mainly through literature skills, which significantly facilitates the prosperity of poems and lyrics in Song. Ideas such as loyalty and virginity are encouraged to be expressed in examination writings.

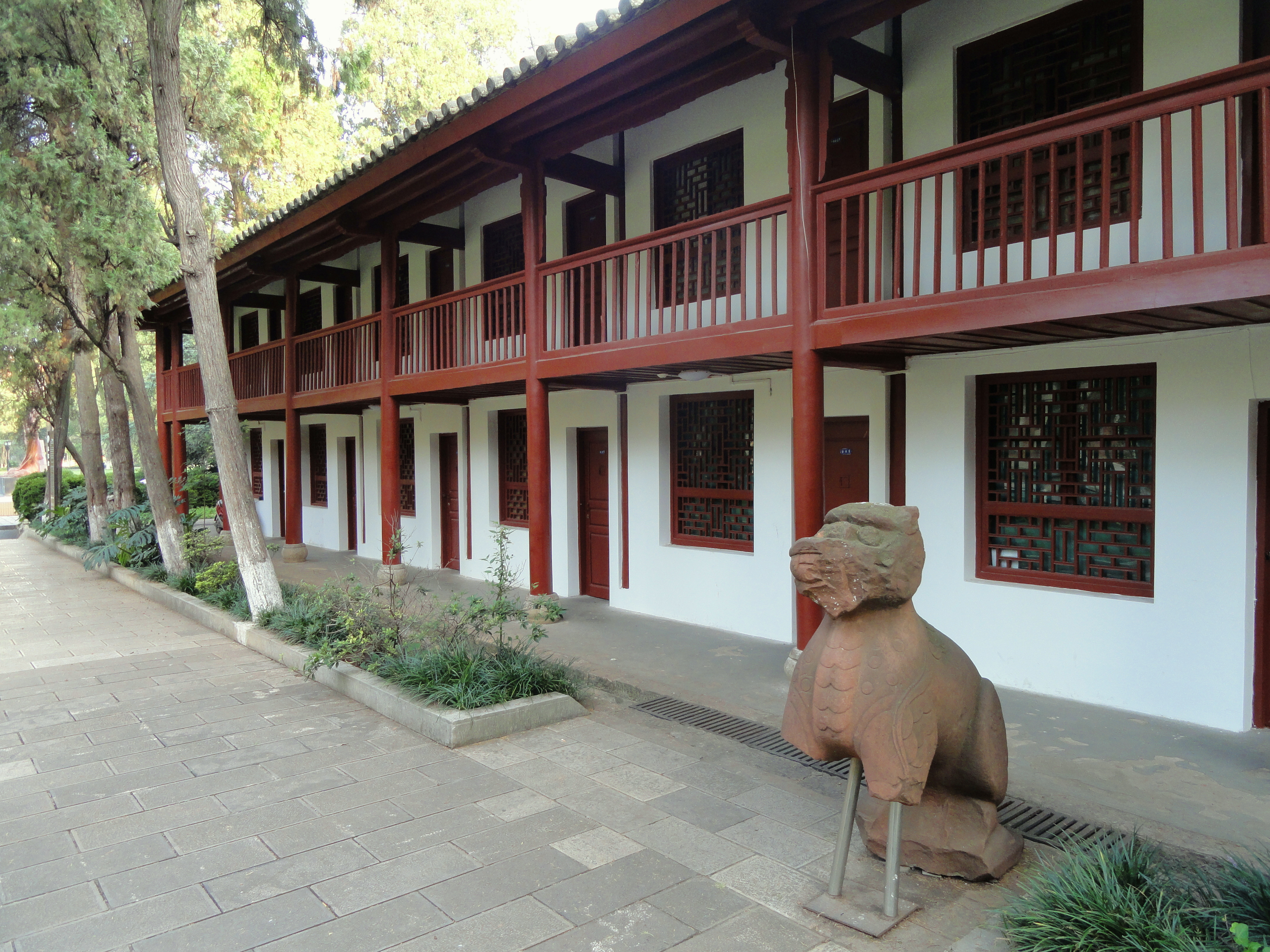
The examination hall where imperial examinations take place

Wenyuan Yinghua, aiming to collect the best of Song literature, also reflects this function. The best Answers from past exams are included. The question of the exam varies from "Early snow in Spring" to "bamboo in the backyard." A worth-noting fact is that the answer with the highest regard usually eulogizes the emperor. For example, in the "Early snow in Spring" exam poem collected in Wenyuan Yinghua, the author says it's the god that lets snowfall, responding to the goodwill and high moral standard of the emperor.

The imperial examination acts to stabilize both the imperial order and society. The talented are selected and serve in public offices rather than destabilizing the community.

=== Lifestyle in Song ===
Wenyuan Yinghua contains poems depicting daily events in Song, including trade and commerce activities. Some scenes depict government officials collecting taxes from the poor. The writers wanted to express their pity for the poor and gratitude for their contribution. But sometimes, even sympathy must be expressed in symbolic ways in the literature.

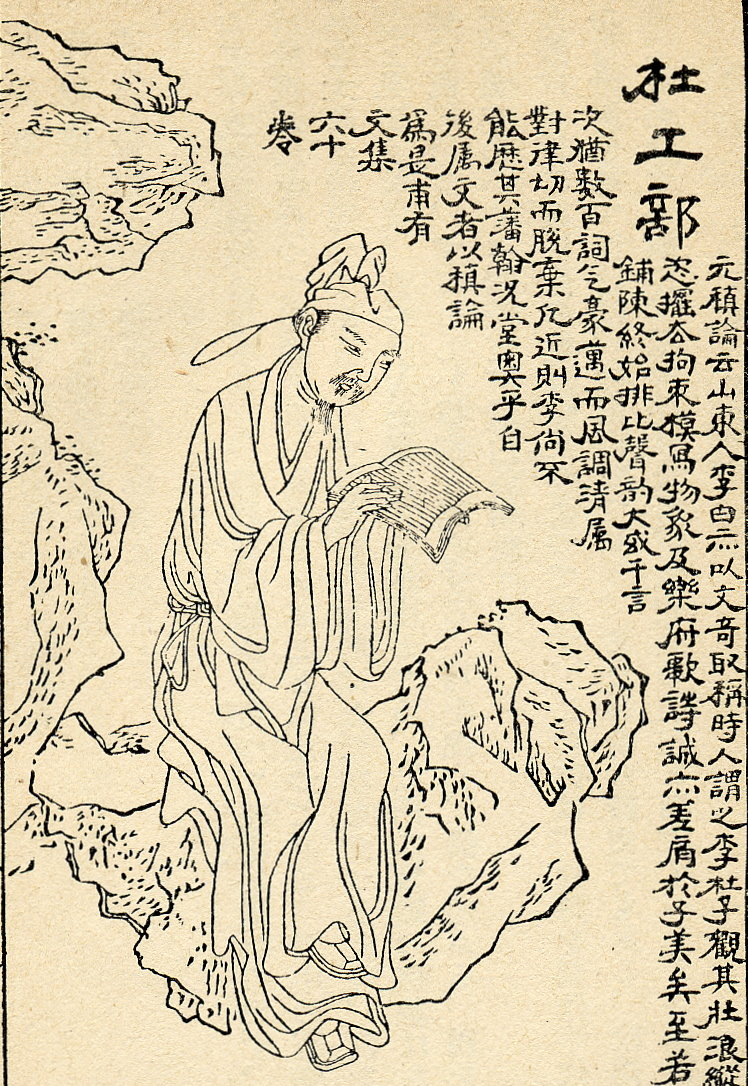
Some poems by Dufu presence in Wenyuan Yinghua have significant social influence

Progress in science can be seen in the writings. Detailed accounts in poems for astronomy, math, architecture, fireworks, and other inventions all show the progress of technology in Song.

=== Reflection of major historical events ===
Natural disasters at the time are recorded through literature. A flood or drought going on in Hebei might be neglectable for historians, but writers who experienced or witnessed the destruction it brought would record them in their writing. Besides, it might make a difference—famous poets describing the scenes and conditions of citizens could sometimes attract the attention of the imperial court and eventually have the impacted states got official support.

Wars between imperial dynasty and border nations is also a well-implemented subject. While accounts of victories of imperial forces are often seen as another way to praise imperials, authors sometimes secretly expressed their concerns about the huge cost and death behind the victories.

== Literary functions: social and educational ==
The literature of Wenyuan Yinghua served educational purposes for future scholars. The compilation aimed to find a place in the history of literature. Thus, many renowned and famous works of that time are included. The work is an encyclopedia of literature; imperial scholars can look into the compilation to find the work they want. Although the compilation stayed distanced from the general population, the work included in the compilation continues to be popular. The lyrics and poems written by poets such as Su Shi and Du Fu are still well known in present-day as they put out a voice for the commons and sympathize with their pain and hardness.

== Mulan and Wenyuan Yinghua ==
The story of Mulan was one of the works collected in Wenyuan Yinghua about a girl going to war against the Huns. It was immediately recognized by scholars at the time and has long been considered a masterpiece of North Dynasty poems. It was just like other numerous famous narrative poems that appeared in Wenyuan Yinghua until Disney made it a buzz by producing the animation "Mulan." "Mulan" was officially released in 1998 and immediately became a hit throughout the world. It had become a cultural symbol for China that projected the optimism and bravery of Chinese women.

When composing "Mulan," the directors changed the context of the animation to make the plot more dramatic. However, the core structure of the story stayed the same as it was originally composed by a Northern Dynasty poet and collected in Wenyuan Yinghua.

Mulan acts as a messenger that penetrates all cultural barriers and biases. Although few know the source of the piece in the west, Chinese poems with Wenyuan Yinghua as an example prove that it contains stories and lyrics that can still have meaning to modern-day people. They are yet to be fully explored and researched.

== Wenyuan Yinghua’s impact and legacy ==
Wenyuan Yinghua, as collected literature of refined works, generated huge value for future Chinese writers and scholars. It brought convenience for later scholars to understand the writings and literature of that period. A lot of the later collection of poetry and songs, such as the Complete Tang Poems, also uses work from Wenyuan Yinghua.

Scholars widely refer to the works when they try to compose an analysis or judgment of Song and Tang. Famous scholars like Zhu Xi and Fang Songqing quoted the pieces and left comments. Wenyuan Yinghua is also one of the sources of the Complete Library of the Four Treasuries composed in the Qing dynasty.

Wenyuan Yinghua influences the circle of Han culture, namely countries such as Japan and Korea. Wenyuan Yinghua was spread to these countries through cultural exchange by the "Imperial embassy to China" (put wiki link). Copies of the original version of Wenyuan Yinghua are preserved in several Japanese monasteries today and act as valuable sources for Japanese scholars researching that part of history.
