= Wang Mo =

Chinese politician and educator (1895–1958)

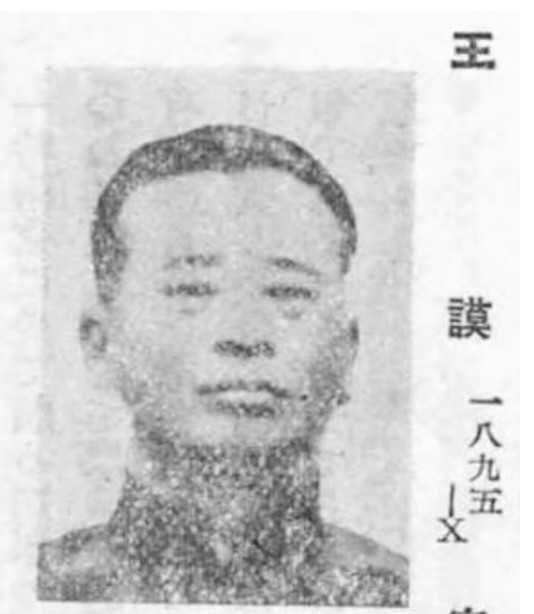
Wang c. 1940

Wang Mo (traditional Chinese: 王謨; simplified Chinese: 王谟; pinyin: Wáng Mó; Wade-Giles: Wang Mo) (1895 – 1958) was a Chinese politician and educator. He was an important politician during the Wang Jingwei regime (Republic of China-Nanjing).

== Biography ==
Wang was born in 1895, in Yilong. He went to Japan where he graduated the Tokyo Teacher's High School (東京高等師範学校; Now, the Tokyo University of Education, 東京教育大学) and the Tokyo Imperial University. Later he returned to China, he successively held the positions of Professor of the National University of Wuchang (國立武昌大學), National University of Beiping (國立北平大學), Teacher's College (師範大學) and Tsinghua University. And he was also elected to Senator of the Beijing Government. He later worked as president of the National Teacher's University of Beiping (國立北平師範大學), from 1942, he also worked as a professor at this university.

In November 1943, upon the reformation of the North China Political Council (華北政務委員會), Wang was catapulted to Chief of the General Office for Education (教育總署督辦) and Executive Member of the same Council. In next July, he resigned his post.

Following the defeat of Japan in August 1945, Wang was arrested by Chiang Kai-shek's government and imprisoned in Nanjing. He received a sentence of 10 years in prison. However, in 1949 he was released and retired in Beijing. He died in 1958, aged 62 or 63.
