= The Encyclopaedia Sinica =

Encyclopaedia Sinica
- Edition Published by Kelly and Walsh; Literature House, Shanghai, 1964
- Author: Samuel Couling
- Language: English
- Subject: China
- Publisher: Kelly & Walsh
- Publication date: 1917
- Publication place: British Hong Kong
- Media type: Print (hardcover)
- Pages: 633 pp (first edition)
- OCLC: 3794695
- LC Class: DS733.C7

The Encyclopaedia Sinica is a 1917 English-language encyclopedia on China and China-related subjects edited by English missionary Samuel Couling. It covers a range of topics and provides insight on early 20th century perspectives towards China. Commentators report that the work is still useful at the turn of the 21st century particularly to aid the understanding of the relationship between China and the United Kingdom.
