= Taiping Yulan =

Chinese encyclopedia compiled between 977 and 983

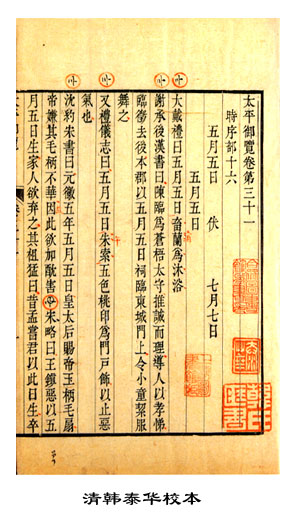
- Traditional Chinese: 太平御覽
- Simplified Chinese: 太平御览
- Literal meaning: Imperial Reader of the Era of Great Peace
Transcriptions
Standard Mandarin
- Hanyu Pinyin: Tàipíng Yùlǎn
- Wade–Giles: T‘ai-p‘ing Yü-lan
Yue: Cantonese
- Jyutping: Taai3 ping4 Jyu6 laam5

The Taiping Yulan, translated as the Imperial Reader or Readings of the Taiping (Xingguo) Era, is a massive Chinese leishu encyclopedia compiled by a team of scholars from 977 to 983. It was commissioned by the imperial court of the Song dynasty during the first era of the reign of Emperor Taizong. It is divided into 1,000 volumes and 55 sections, which consisted of about 4.7 million Chinese characters. It included citations from about 2,579 different kinds of documents spanning from books, poetry, odes, proverbs, steles to miscellaneous works. After its completion, the Emperor Taizong is said to have finished reading it within a year, going through 3 volumes per day. It is considered one of the Four Great Books of Song.

The team who compiled the Taiping Yulan includes: Tang Yue (湯悅), Zhang Wei (張洎), Xu Xuan (徐鉉), Song Bai (宋白), Xu Yongbin (徐用賓), Chen E (陳鄂), Wu Shu (吳淑), Shu Ya (舒雅), Lü Wenzhong (吕文仲), Ruan Sidao (阮思道), Hu Meng (扈蒙), Li Fang (李昉), and others.

It is one of the sources used by Ming and Qing scholars to reconstruct the lost Record of the Seasons of Jingchu.

It should not be confused with Taiping Huanyu Ji or Taiping Guangji, which were compiled around the same era.

== Significant Manuscripts ==
One such copy of the Taiping Yulan is held at Tōfuku-ji in Kyoto, Japan. In 1244, Enni was approved by the Song government to bring back 103 volumes of the encyclopedia, and later on, an additional 10 volumes were brought in for circulation amongst Japanese monks. The 103 volumes are now classified as a National Treasure.

In 2024, a grant from the Agency for Cultural Affairs and the Yomiuri Shimbun will help conserve and restore the Tōfuku-ji encyclopedia, which is the only 1000 volume version to survive from the Song Dynasty.
