= Vân đài loại ngữ =

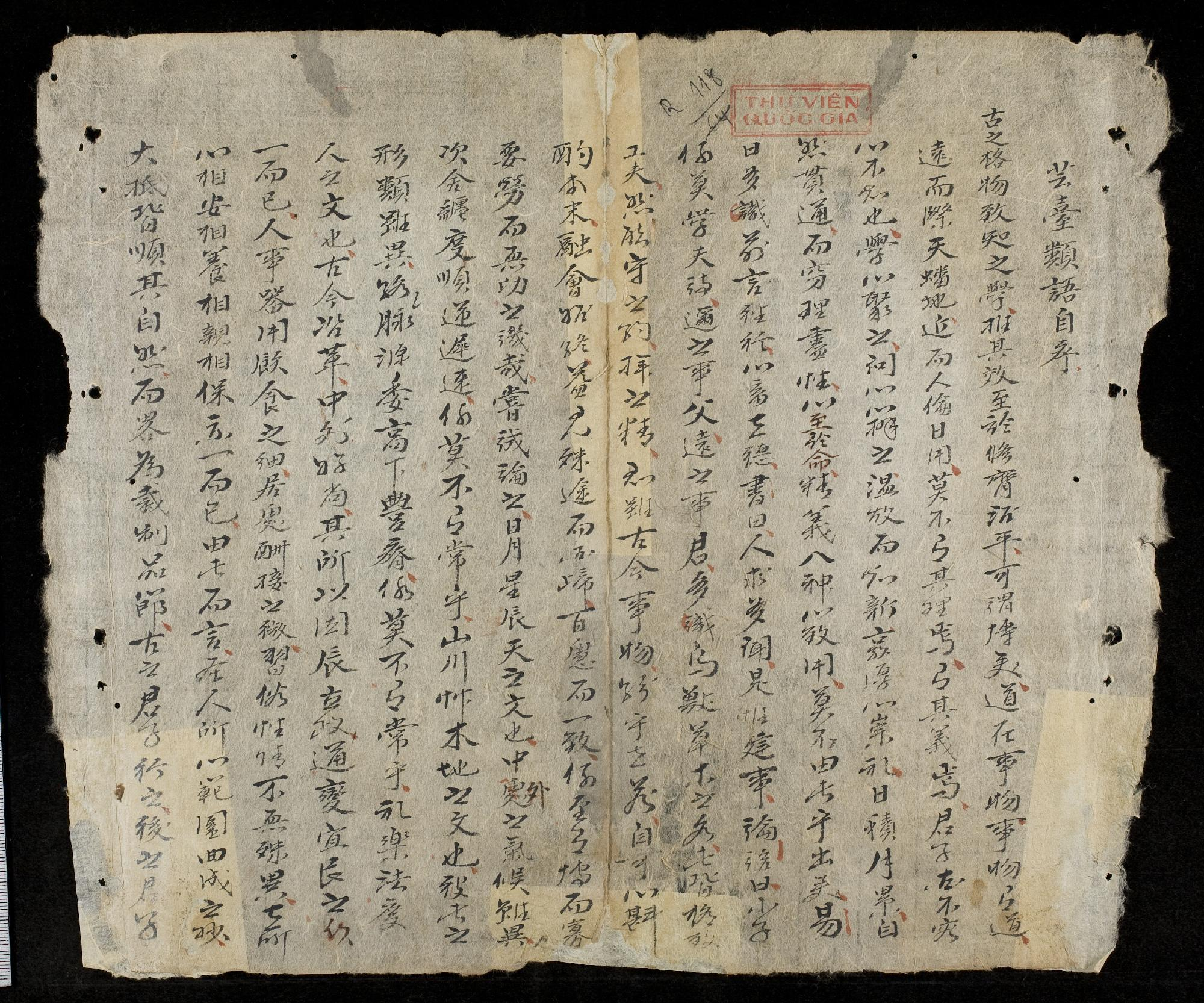
- Page 1-2 of vol 1, encyclopedia Vân đài loại ngữ
- Author(s): Lê Quý Đôn
- Language: chữ Hán
- Date of issue: 1773

The Vân đài loại ngữ (芸臺類語) is a 1773 chữ Hán encyclopedia compiled by the Vietnamese scholar Lê Quý Đôn. Its title is variously translated into English as Categorized Sayings from the Van Terrace or Classified discourse from the library. The work was heavily influenced by Song dynasty Confucianism.
