= Lê Quý Đôn =

Vietnamese writer (1726–1784)

- Lê Danh Phương
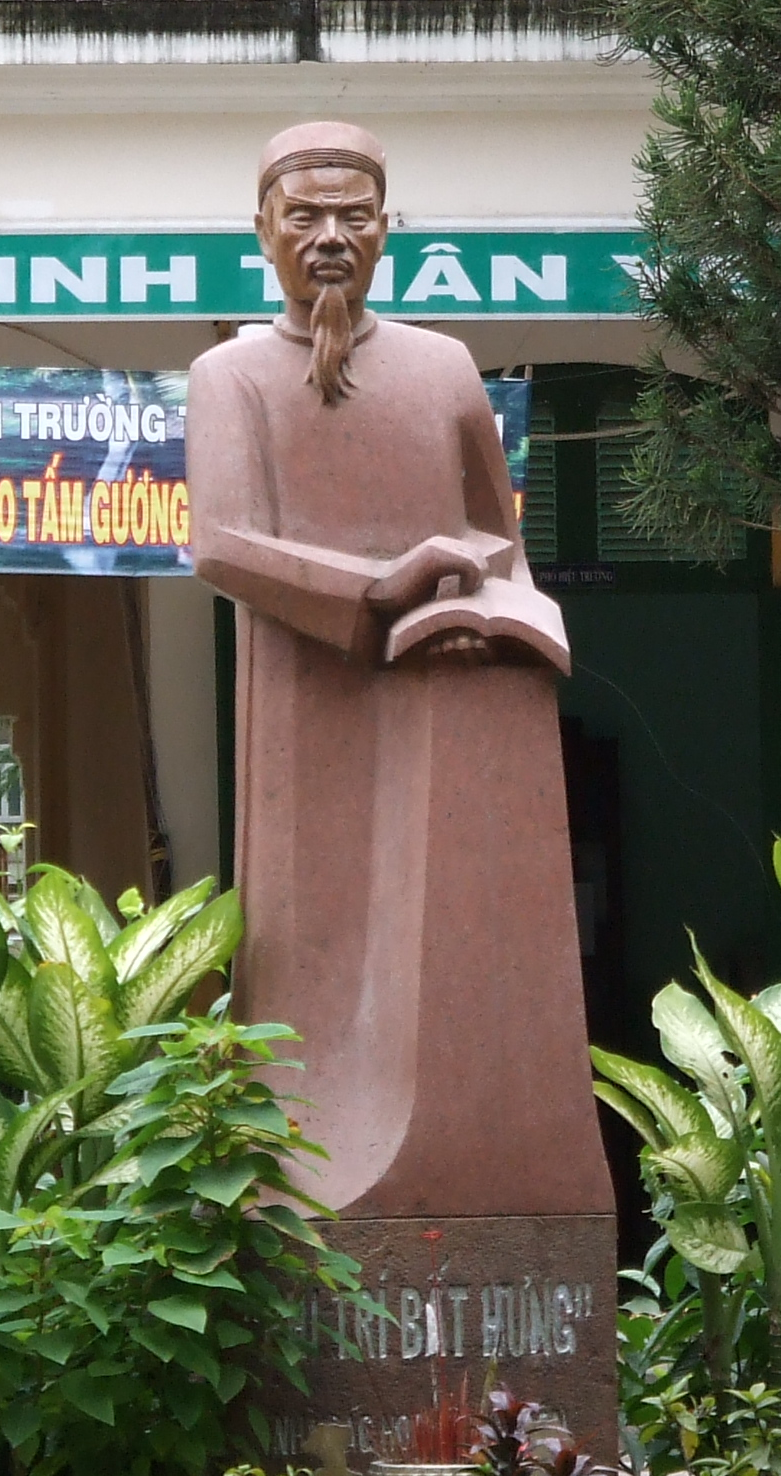
- A statue of Lê Quý Đôn in Lê Quý Đôn High School, District 3, Ho Chi Minh City
- Born: 2 August 1726; Diên Hà, Thái Bình, Northern Vietnam
- Died: 11 June 1784 (aged 57); Hà Nam, North Vietnam
- Other names: Doãn Hậu, Quế Đường
- Citizenship: Đại Việt (present-day Vietnam)
- Occupation: Quốc tử Giam
- Known for: Đại Việt thông sử Toàn Việt thi lục Phủ biên tạp lục
- Spouse: Lê Thị Trang
- Children: Lê Quý Kiệt; Lê Quý Châu; Lê Quý Tá; Lê Quý Nghị
- Relatives: Lê Trọng Thứ (faither; 1693–1783); Trương Thị Ích (mother)
- Scientific career
- Fields: Politics, History, Geography, Linguistics, Poetry, Encyclopedist
- Workplaces: Quốc tử giám of Hanoi

Lê Quý Đôn (chữ Hán: (黎貴惇; 2 August 1726 – 11 June 1784), né Lê Danh Phương, also known by his courtesy name Doãn Hậu 允厚 and his pen name Quế Đường 桂堂 was an 18th-century Vietnamese poet, encyclopedist, and government official. He was a native of Duyen Ha village in present-day Thái Bình Province. Alongside Lý Thường Kiệt, Trần Hưng Ðạo, Chu Văn An, and Lý Tế Xuyên, he is considered one of Vietnam's nationalist writers and a revered polymath of the early modern period for the "astuteness of his work and phenomenal productivity."

== Life ==
Lê was born in the province of Thái Bình, and lived in the reign of Emperor Lê Hiển Tông. The period of his life was marked by a split between the Trịnh lords of the north and the Nguyễn lords, in the aftermath of an examination system scandal involving his son Lê Quý Kiêt (who was sent to prison for changing examination books), had been ordered south of the Linh Giang River to serve as an official ...As a member of the Trịnh lords' bureaucracy, Lê Quý Đôn was supposed to help restore civil government in a region of Viet Nam that had been separate from the Trịnh lords' control for over two centuries, and facilitate the reincorporation of the southern territories, particularly those controlled by the Nguyễn lords, into the authority of the Trịnh-led northern government.

In 1760, Lê Quý Đôn went to China as an ambassador. He later served as a government official in the ministries of war, finance and public works. He also served as the rector of the National University situated in the Văn Miếu in Hanoi and as Director of the Bureau of Annals. It is said that Lê was traveling with some Qing officials, and along the way they saw a Chinese poem inscribed on a stone palette. Later, one of the Qing officials, to test his merit, asked him if he could remember what was on the stone palette. Lê recited the entire poem, word for word, in Chinese. That earned him a great deal of respect from the Chinese.

== Writings ==
Lê Quý Đôn was responsible for a large number of encyclopedic, historical, bibliographical, and philosophical works. It is estimated that he has the largest volume of works among Vietnamese literature using Chinese characters (about 40 series with hundreds of volumes).

- The Vân đài loại ngữ (Classified Sayings, 9 volumes) is Vietnam's largest encyclopedia, a landmark in Vietnamese science in the Confucian era.
- The history Đại Việt thông sử (30 volumes) contains many documents about the Lê dynasty.
- The Phủ biên tạp lục (Frontier Chronicles) (6 volumes) was a detailed description of Nguyễn territories in Thuận Hóa and Quảng Nam Provinces.

== Legacy ==
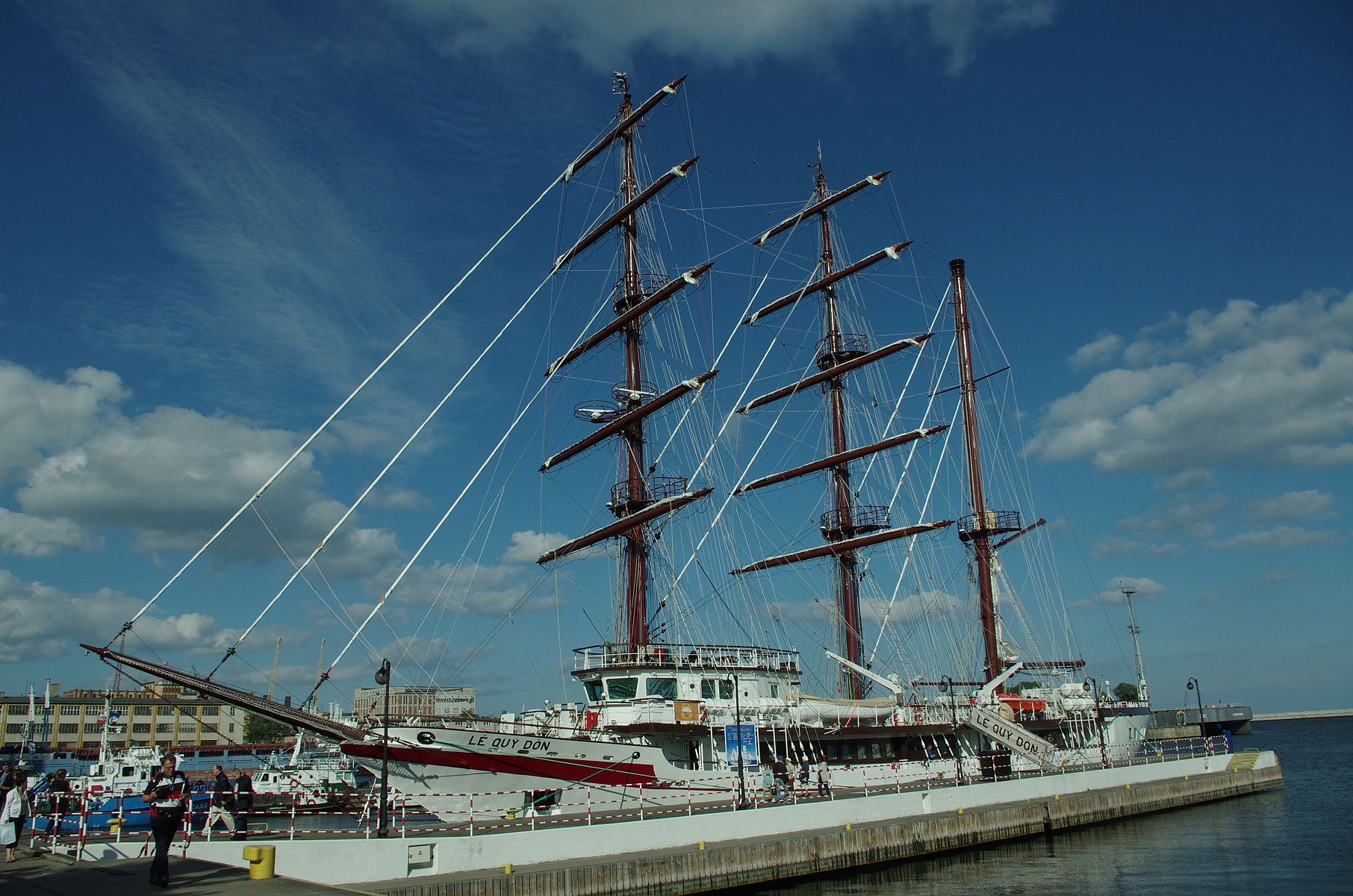
STS "Lê Quý Đôn″ at the port of Gdynia, Poland, September 2015

Today, one of largest technical universities in Hanoi, Le Quy Don Technical University (LeTech), and many schools in Vietnam are named after him. Most cities in Vietnam have named major streets after him.

Le Quy Don High School in District 3 is the first high school to be established in Saigon, Vietnam. The school was built in 1874 and it has been fostering generation of students up until this day. Despite being over a century old, Le Quy Don High School has still maintained most of its original architecture. The school's location in central Saigon makes it one of the most popular spots for filming.

Finally, "Lê Quý Đôn″ is also the name of a new Vietnamese sail training ship, built in 2015 by the Polish ship yard Marine Projects Ltd. on behalf of Polish Defence Holding in Gdynia. Some of its data: overall length: 65.0 m, breadth: 10.0 m, air draft: 42.0 m, sails area: 1395 m^{2}, propulsion: 880 kW, crew and cadets: 30 + 80 persons.

== Literary Anecdote ==
Anecdotally, the young boy Lê Quý Đôn was tested by Scholar Vũ Công Trấn, after visiting fellow graduate Lê Trọng Thứ (formerly Lê Phú Thứ), with the poem titled Rắn đầu biếng học ("Stubborn-headed snake, indolent in study" – a metaphorical rebuke for obstinacy and laziness in learning).

Lê Quý Đôn composed a poem in the classical thất ngôn bát cú form, embedding the name of a distinct snake species into each line as subtle self-deprecating wit, while adhering to rhyme, tone, and structure:

Chẳng phải liu điu vẫn giống nhà!
Rắn đầu biếng học lẽ không tha
Thẹn đèn hổ lửa đau lòng mẹ,
Nay thét mai gầm rát cổ cha.
Ráo mép chỉ quen tuồng lếu láo,
Lằn lưng cam chịu vết roi da.
Từ nay Trâu Lỗ xin siêng học,
Kẻo hổ mang danh tiếng thế gia!

=== English Translation with Line-by-Line Interpretation ===
No lowly water snake, yet true to noble lineage!

Meaning: The boy affirms his worthy family background (not of humble or insignificant origin), rejecting any lowly comparison.

Stubborn snake-head, indolent in study—no leniency shall be shown.

Meaning: Directly echoes the title's rebuke: a "hard-headed" (stubborn) child who is lazy at learning will not be forgiven or excused.

Shamed beneath the lamp, coral snake dreads the flame—mother's heart in anguish.

Meaning: Under the study lamp (symbol of diligence), the shame of laziness causes fiery inner torment, deeply hurting the mother's feelings.

Shouts today, golden-banded roars tomorrow—father's throat grows hoarse from constant reprimand.

Meaning: The parents' repeated scolding (yelling today and roaring threats tomorrow) wears down the father's voice, showing the toll of the child's disobedience.

Rat snake's tongue versed only in deceit and insolence.

Meaning: A glib, smooth-talking nature (like the rat snake's quick tongue) leads only to lies and cheeky behavior.

Whip snake's back bears the lash's cruel stripes without complaint.

Meaning: The child passively accepts punishment (whip marks on the back), enduring corporal discipline as deserved consequence.

Henceforth, buffalo snake of Zou and Lu vows diligent pursuit of learning.

Meaning: From now on, like the mighty buffalo snake (symbol of strength), and drawing inspiration from the Confucian homelands Zou (Mencius) and Lu (Confucius), the boy pledges to study earnestly and reform.

Lest cobra carry disgrace upon the family's honored name!

Meaning: Otherwise, he risks bringing shame ("cobra" plays on "bearing a tiger" or carrying burden) to the entire family's reputation and legacy.

=== Overall Interpretation of the Wordplay ===
This poem turns paternal admonition ("rắn đầu" – hard-headed laziness) into profound humility and promise of redemption. Each line integrates a snake reference (liu điu = water snake, rắn đầu = stubborn snake-head, hổ lửa = coral/tiger-fire snake, mai gầm = golden-banded/roaring snake, ráo = rat snake, lằn = whip/striped snake, trâu = buffalo snake/hổ trâu, hổ mang = cobra), weaving reptilian imagery with themes of indolence, parental sorrow, deserved punishment, and vowed scholarly diligence.

== Geographical names and landmarks named after Lê Quý Đôn ==
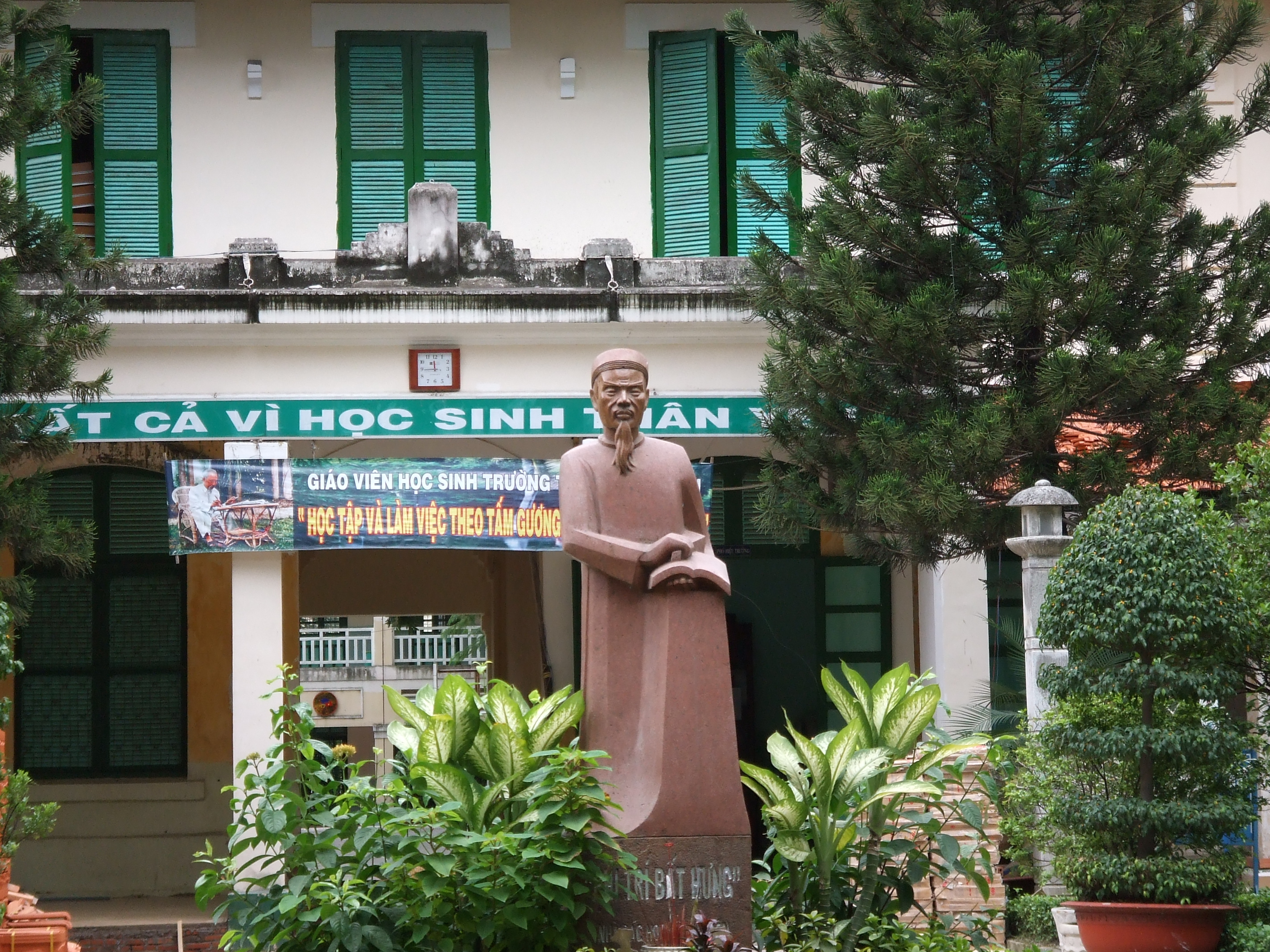
Lê Quý Đôn High School, District 3, Ho Chi Minh City

=== Geographical names ===
Under the 2025 Vietnam Provincial and City Merger Program, Thái Bình province was merged into Hưng Yên province. It is planned that 3 communes of Hưng Hà including Minh Tân, Độc Lập, and Hồng An will be merged into Lê Quý Đôn commune. The headquarters of the commune People's Committee will be located in the former Độc Lập commune, the hometown of Lê Quý Đôn.

- Lê Quý Đôn Street in Uông Bí City
- Lê Quý Đôn Street in Hạ Long City
- Lê Quý Đôn Street in Quảng Yên town
- Lê Quý Đôn Street, Bạch Đằng Ward, Hai Bà Trưng District, Hanoi.
- Lê Quý Đôn Street, District 3, Ho Chi Minh City.
- Lê Quý Đôn Street, Trần Lãm Ward, Thái Bình City, Thái Bình Province.
- Lê Quý Đôn Street, Kinh Bắc Ward, Bắc Ninh Province (new).

=== Landmarks ===
The name Lê Quý Đôn has been used to name many schools throughout Vietnam, such as:

- Lê Quý Đôn Technical University in Hanoi
- Lê Quý Đôn Gifted High School, Đà Nẵng
- Lê Quý Đôn Gifted High School, Bình Định
- Lê Quý Đôn Gifted High School, Vũng Tàu
- Lê Quý Đôn Gifted High School, Ninh Thuận
- Lê Quý Đôn Gifted High School, Khánh Hòa
- Lê Quý Đôn Gifted High School, Quảng Trị
- Lê Quý Đôn Gifted High School, Điện Biên
- Lê Quý Đôn Gifted High School, Lai Châu
- Lê Quý Đôn High School, Ho Chi Minh City
- Lê Quý Đôn – Đống Đa High School, Hanoi
- Lê Quý Đôn High School, Thái Bình
- Lê Quý Đôn High School – Cẩm Phả City, Quảng Ninh
- Lê Quý Đôn High School – Hải Phòng
- Lê Quý Đôn High School – Tam Kỳ City, Quảng Nam
- Lê Quý Đôn High School – Hà Tĩnh
- Lê Quý Đôn High School – Hòa Bình
- Lê Quý Đôn High School – Biên Hòa City, Đồng Nai
- Lê Quý Đôn High School – Hà Đông District, Hanoi
- Lê Quý Đôn Secondary School – Cầu Giấy District, Hanoi
- Lê Quý Đôn Secondary School – Vị Thanh City, Hậu Giang
- Lê Quý Đôn High School – Ngã Bảy City, Hậu Giang
- Lê Quý Đôn High School – Long An
- Lê Quý Đôn High School – Đắk Nông
- Lê Quý Đôn High School – Bắc Ninh
- Lê Danh Phương Secondary School – Hưng Hà, Thái Bình City
- Lê Quý Đôn Secondary School – District 3, Ho Chi Minh City
- Lê Quý Đôn Secondary School – Bắc Giang City, Bắc Giang
- Lê Quý Đôn Secondary School – Hải Dương
- Lê Quý Đôn Secondary School – Sóc Trăng City, Sóc Trăng
- Lê Quý Đôn Secondary School – Lào Cai
- Lê Quý Đôn Secondary School – Ý Yên District, Nam Định
- Lê Quý Đôn Secondary School – Mộc Châu District, Sơn La
- Lê Quý Đôn Secondary School, Phúc Lợi Ward, Long Biên District, Hanoi
- Lê Quý Đôn Primary School, Mỹ Tho City, Tiền Giang
- Lê Quý Đôn High School – Buôn Ma Thuột, Đắk Lắk
- Lê Quý Đôn High School, Hòa Thành, Tây Ninh Province
- Lê Quý Đôn Primary School, Đăk Tô District, Kon Tum
- Lê Quý Đôn Primary School, Long Biên District, Hanoi
- Lê Quý Đôn Primary School, Nam Định City, Nam Định Province
- Lê Quý Đôn Secondary School, Hà Đông District, Hanoi

His name is also used for a sail training ship of the Vietnam People's Navy: the ship HQ-286 Lê Quý Đôn.
