= Fayuan Zhulin =

Chinese Buddhist encyclopedic work

Fayuan Zhulin (Chinese: 法苑珠林; pinyin: Fǎyuàn Zhūlín; "Forest of Gems in the Garden of the Dharma"), in 100 juan (卷 "volume", "fascicle"), is a Buddhist encyclopedia compiled AD 668 by Daoshi (道世). It comprises Buddhist and other ancient texts otherwise lost, and is thus an important source for the study of medieval Chinese Buddhism. It was used under the Ming Dynasty to reconstruct older zhiguai collections.
