= China's Wikipedia =

China's Wikipedia may refer to:

- Chinese Wikipedia, the Chinese-language version of Wikipedia
- Baidu Baike, a "wiki-like" Chinese-language online encyclopedia
- Hudong, another "wiki-like" Chinese-language online encyclopedia
- Blocking of Wikipedia in mainland China, China's policy of preventing access to Wikipedia from within the country
