= 2021 Wikimedia Foundation actions on the Chinese Wikipedia =

Response to conflict of interest on Chinese Wikipedia

Logo of Wikimedians of Mainland China

In 2021, the Wikimedia Foundation (WMF) took official action in relation to the Chinese Wikipedia after investigating users from Wikimedians of Mainland China (WMC or WMCUG), an unaffiliated Wikipedia user group.

Seven people from Mainland China were globally banned (Note: A global ban is the formal revocation of editing and other access privileges across all projects operated by the WMF. It may be issued either by community consensus or by a unilateral decision of the WMF.) from editing all Wikimedia sites at September 13, 16:13 UTC (September 14, 00:13 CST). After the ban, 12 other people on Chinese-language projects had their administrative rights revoked, four of whom were among the top ten most active administrators on the Chinese Wikipedia.

== Background ==
=== The Chinese government ===
Despite the censorship of Wikipedia in Mainland China and the normal prohibition on using VPNs to edit it, Wikipedia administrators from China permitted IP block exemptions for a select number of mainland users.

Some of these users were recruited as a part of the Chinese Communist Party's coordinated efforts to push their preferred narrative on platforms that have respected worldwide credibility. Their goal was to change the editorial content on Wikipedia in support of China's viewpoint and/or to support the election of pro-Chinese-government administrators on Wikipedia, with the aim of gaining control of Wikipedia.

There had also been an exodus of volunteer editors leaving Baidu Baike, a domestic wiki-based encyclopedia beset by problems of self-censorship and commercialization, to join Chinese Wikipedia because the "contributors wanted the privilege of working on a higher-quality internet encyclopedia" that also "carries a great deal of international power". Although there is no proven direct link between these editors and the Chinese government, observers have suggested that such actions are not merely the work of patriotic mainlanders, but part of a "larger structural coordinated strategy the government has to manipulate these platforms", including platforms besides Wikipedia such as Twitter and Facebook.

The speculation of a "pro-China infiltration", however, was never proven.

=== The community ===
The Chinese Wikipedia is a strategic point. If you don't capture, others will... The best situation we can get on a neutral Wikipedia is that both sides disagree with the articles. (Note: Chinese: 中文维基是一块高地，你不占领，别人就会占领……当两边都在骂，两边都不满意的时候，这就是维基百科作为中立的百科全书能达到的最佳状态了。)

— "Techyan" En-Min Yan, member of Wikimedians of Mainland China and former administrator

Wikimedians of Mainland China (WMC) was established in 2017, without acknowledgement from the Wikimedia Foundation. A former editor accused the WMC members of being more likely to become administrators, bureaucrats, and oversighters, and personal attacks became persistent after 2017. According to Stand News in September 2021, 38 administrators were from China, while 20 were from Taiwan, 17 were from Hong Kong, and 1 was from Macau.

Another incident that received WMF attention happened in January 2018, in which WMC members physically assaulted another member after that member told the Taiwan user group that WMC leaders were going to meet WMF officials. The meeting was canceled after the incident.

The WMC, having a strong pro-Beijing stance, clashed with Wikipedia editors from Taiwan and Hong Kong. Edit wars approached their peak when the 2019–2020 Hong Kong protests occurred. In August 2020, there were 123 edits on the Chinese entry for the 2019 Yuen Long attack in two days. A Hong Kong-based editor, who remained anonymous because of fears of intimidation, said, "Pro-Beijing people often remove content that is sympathetic to protests, such as tear gas being fired and images of barricades. They also add their own content... Pro-democracy editors tend to add content to shift the balance or the tone of the article, but in my experience, the pro-Beijing editors are a lot more aggressive in churning out disinformation..." They described the actions as "rewriting history." In July 2021, while an edit war on the Yuen Long attack was underway, several WMC members threatened to report Hong Kong editors to the National Security Department hotline, according to the Hong Kong Free Press.

== Reactions ==
The WMF globally banned seven people from editing all Wikimedia sites on September 13, 2021, at 16:13 UTC (September 14, 2021, 00:13 CST). It also revoked the administrative rights of 12 people on Chinese-language projects after the ban. Four of the top ten most active administrators on the Chinese Wikipedia had their rights revoked.

In a Wikimedia announcement about the actions, Dennis acknowledged the radical nature of the Foundation's actions but stressed that the decision was based on a number of considerations and an in-depth investigation. The Foundation decided to take action after Dennis told the media that editors had tried to manipulate the content of articles as well as the election of administrators and that other editors had been physically harmed. However, she did not intend to accuse the Chinese government.

In response, WMC posted an open letter titled "Cast Away Illusions, Prepare for Struggle" (丢掉幻想，准备斗争), (Note: pinyin: Dīudiào huànxiǎng, zhǔnbèi dòuzhēng) calling the Wikimedia Foundation's actions baseless (Note: Chinese: 莫须有; pinyin: Mòxūyǒu) and declaring its intention to resist the crackdown with practical action. The Global Times, a tabloid officially owned and operated by the Central Committee of the Chinese Communist Party, alleged that the Wikimedia Foundation "purged" the Chinese editors.

In an interview with a BBC program on Chinese developments, Maryana Iskander, the then-new chief executive officer of the Wikimedia Foundation, emphasized the autonomy of the Wikipedia community and said, "One of the very early things that I've learned in this process is that certainly the Wikimedia Foundation does not play a role in setting editorial policy and that these are the debates that happen in communities."

Jimmy Wales, the co-founder of Wikipedia, commented on these actions in an interview with BBC: "I have deep experience of talking to people all over the world, and the idea that people in China, for example, are so brainwashed that they can't see that neutrality is just false," but also said, "The idea that we are excluding China is absurd. We welcome with open arms editors from China."

After the Wikimedia Foundation took action against the WMC editors, the Taiwanese Wikipedia community stated that such an action was long overdue. It released a statement saying, "We need to rebuild an inclusive wiki that welcomes everyone from all places who wants to contribute to Chinese language Wikipedia in good faith... Many people have felt unsafe for years, so restoring a shared sense of comfort is likely to take some time".

== Subsequent events ==
On October 5, 2021, at the 62nd session of the World Intellectual Property Organization (WIPO), China voted against the WMF's application to become an official observer of the WIPO on the grounds that Wikipedia violated the "one-China principle" and "disseminated false information". China was the only country out of the 193 members of the organization to vote against the WIPO application, causing the application to fail.

After the foundation's application was rejected, a Wikimedian showed a screenshot to Voice of America of an announcement made by globally banned user "Walter Grassroot" in the WMC's QQ group. According to the announcement, after the foundation banned Chinese users, Chinese Wikimedians submitted relevant documents to the Chinese Embassy in Geneva through various channels. Walter Grassroot also suggested that the failure of the foundation's application was good news. Between 2021 and 2025, all attempts by the Wikimedia Foundation and local chapters to join WIPO failed.

=== Qiuwen Baike ===
Qiuwen Baike 求闻百科
- Website type: Online encyclopedia
- Available in: Simplified Chinese, Traditional Chinese (supports traditional and simplified conversion)
- Predecessor: Chinese Wikipedia
- Website: www.qiuwenbaike.cn
- Commercial: No
- Content license: Creative Commons; Attribution-ShareAlike 4.0

In an interview with the BBC in late October 2021, globally banned WMC member Yan "Techyan" Emming and six other users said that the user group was attempting to create a "Chinese version of Wikipedia". That fork would represent the Chinese narrative on "some political issues" and be available for people in mainland China without a VPN. It would be under the oversight of the Chinese government and reuse content produced by Wikipedia.

In December 2021, Techyan told Fast Company that "a tech giant" was negotiating a partnership with them, and that more than 40 Chinese Wikipedia editors had joined Qiuwen Baike; the latter had a total of 200 active editors. They also said that people would be involved in both Wikipedia and Qiuwen.

In February 2022, ByteDance's subsidiary Baike.com denied the existence of a partnership between ByteDance and WMC to provide technical and financial support for Qiuwen Baike.

== See also ==
- Wikimedia censorship in mainland China
- 2022 Wikimedia Foundation actions against MENA Wikipedians
