= Baike =

Baike may refer to:

- Baidu Baike, Chinese collaborative web-based encyclopedia
- Baike.com, Chinese social network
- Soso Baike, Chinese collaborative web-based encyclopedia
