= Wikipedia in China =

Wikipedia in China may refer to:

- Chinese Wikipedia, the Chinese-language version of Wikipedia
- Blocking of Wikipedia in mainland China, the People's Republic of China's policy of preventing access to Wikipedia from within the country
