= AAMA =

AAMA or Aama may refer to:

== Organizations ==
- American Amusement Machine Association
- American Apparel Manufacturers Association
- American Automobile Manufacturers Association
- Arab American Medical Association, former title of the National Arab American Medical Association
- Asia America Multitechnology Association

== Other uses ==
- Aama (1964 film)
- Aama (2020 film)
- Aama, Nepal
