= Sogou Baike =

Chinese wiki-based online encyclopedia

Sogou Baike (Chinese: 搜狗百科; pinyin: Sōugǒu Bǎikē); Sogou Encyclopedia, formerly Soso Baike (Chinese: 搜搜百科) is a Chinese-language collaborative web-based encyclopedia provided by the Chinese tech company Sogou and formerly by the search engine Soso. Sogou is part of Tencent, China's largest internal portal. It was officially launched as Soso Baike in on 30 March 2009. The Soso Baike officially changed its name to Sogou Baike and launch it in 2013.

Like Wikipedia, Sogou Baike is a collaboratively written online encyclopedia with user-generated content, though it is operated by a for-profit company rather than a non-profit organization.

== Existing problems and defects ==
Although Sosou Baike has a review mechanism similar to Baidu Baike, it is relatively immature. Usually most of the content is discussed and modified by ordinary users, usually in a democratic manner. Sosou Encyclopedia places more emphasis on the opinions of its administrators in this regard, resulting in many malicious entries not being deleted in time, and some entries that are original and attract much attention cannot be promoted. Some parody entries are suspected of infringement and have caused dissatisfaction among netizens. At the same time, some correct modifications failed to pass review, and users were unable to appeal. In addition, some entries that were rated as "high-quality versions" with "rich content", such as the expanded version of the "魔法王国" entry, were deleted without reason.

In its early development, Sogou Baike imitated other encyclopedia products to a certain extent. For example, the content of its help page is very similar to that of Baidu Encyclopedia. Some comments also pointed out that some of the entries are also imitations of interactive encyclopedia and Baidu Encyclopedia. The content of Encyclopedia and Chinese Wikipedia is copied directly.

== Copyright infringement allegations ==
In 2018, the publishers of the Hanyu Da Cidian sued Sogou, the parent company of Sogou Baike, for copyright infringement within the encyclopedia. The People's Court of Haidian District in Beijing took on the case.

== See also ==
- Baidu Baike
- Chinese Wikipedia
- Hudong Baike
