= BaiduWiki =

Multilingual wiki-based online encyclopedia

- Logo
- Website type: Online encyclopedia
- Available in: English, Japanese, French, Spanish, and Russian
- Founded: 2026
- Headquarters: Beijing, China
- Owner: Baidu
- Creator: Baidu
- Website: baike.baidu.com/en/index
- Commercial: Yes
- Registration: Optional (required to edit pages)
- Current status: Active

Chinese name
- Traditional Chinese: 百度維基
- Simplified Chinese: 百度维基
Transcriptions
Standard Mandarin
- Hanyu Pinyin: Bǎidù Wéijī

BaiduWiki is the international multilingual version of the Baidu Baike online encyclopedia. It was launched in January 2026, in five languages: English, French, Spanish, Russian and Japanese. The articles were translated from Baidu Baike with the help of AI tools. The intention is to compete with Wikipedia for the international market. The launch of BaiduWiki marks Baidu Baike's official transition from a Chinese single-language version to an international multilingual version.

== History ==
Baidu Baike was created in Chinese language by Baidu founder Robin Li, and was released to the public as a replacement of Wikipedia in China around 20 April 2006, following the Chinese government's decision to censor Wikipedia in 2005.

During the WWW2008 conference of the World Wide Web Consortium, Baidu's William Chang said, "There is, in fact, no reason for China to use Wikipedia ... It's very natural for China to make its own products." The Chinese government has, through the Great Firewall, blocked access to all editions of Wikipedia since 2019.

Baidu Baike reached 30 million articles in 2025. In the mid-2020s, Baidu Baike faced challenges from large language model-based AI assistants supplanting the need for users to consult Baidu Baike for information.

On January 30, 2026, Baidu launched BaiduWiki, an international version of Baidu Baike available in English, Japanese, French, Spanish, and Russian. The articles were translated from the Chinese version Baidu Baike with help of AI tools. The launch of BaiduWiki marks Baidu Baike's official transition from a Chinese knowledge platform to a global knowledge service. It also marks the expansion of Baidu's single-language version to a Chinese version and an international multilingual version.

On February 1, 2026, the numbers of articles on BaiduWiki exceeded one million.

On February 9, 2026, an "international version" entry point was added to the traditional Baidu Baike, allowing readers to move directly from its Chinese pages to their corresponding multilingual pages on BaiduWiki.

== Features ==
BaiduWiki is a multilingual online encyclopedia of around one million entries in Wikipedia style, available in English, Spanish, French, Russian and Japanese. The purpose is to create an authoritative portal for international users to understand Chinese culture.

The articles were translated from selected contents of the Chinese Baidu Baike of over 30 million articles, with the help of multiple AI agents including Baidu's ERNIE AI model.

BaiduWiki supports content presentation by video, text and images, and relationships. In the first week after its launch, BaiduWiki saw a 37% increase in searches by overseas users and a 52% increase in views of knowledge-based content.

As of February 2026, Baidu had accumulated over 8.03 million contributing users. Its "Program of Stars" has partnered with institutions such as the Chinese Academy of Sciences and Peking University, and collaborated with 100,000 experts to create over 1 million pieces of professional knowledge.

== See also ==
- Censorship of Wikipedia § China
- Grokipedia
- List of online encyclopedias
- Wikimedia censorship in mainland China
