= Leiden Asia Centre =

Dutch academic knowledge centre

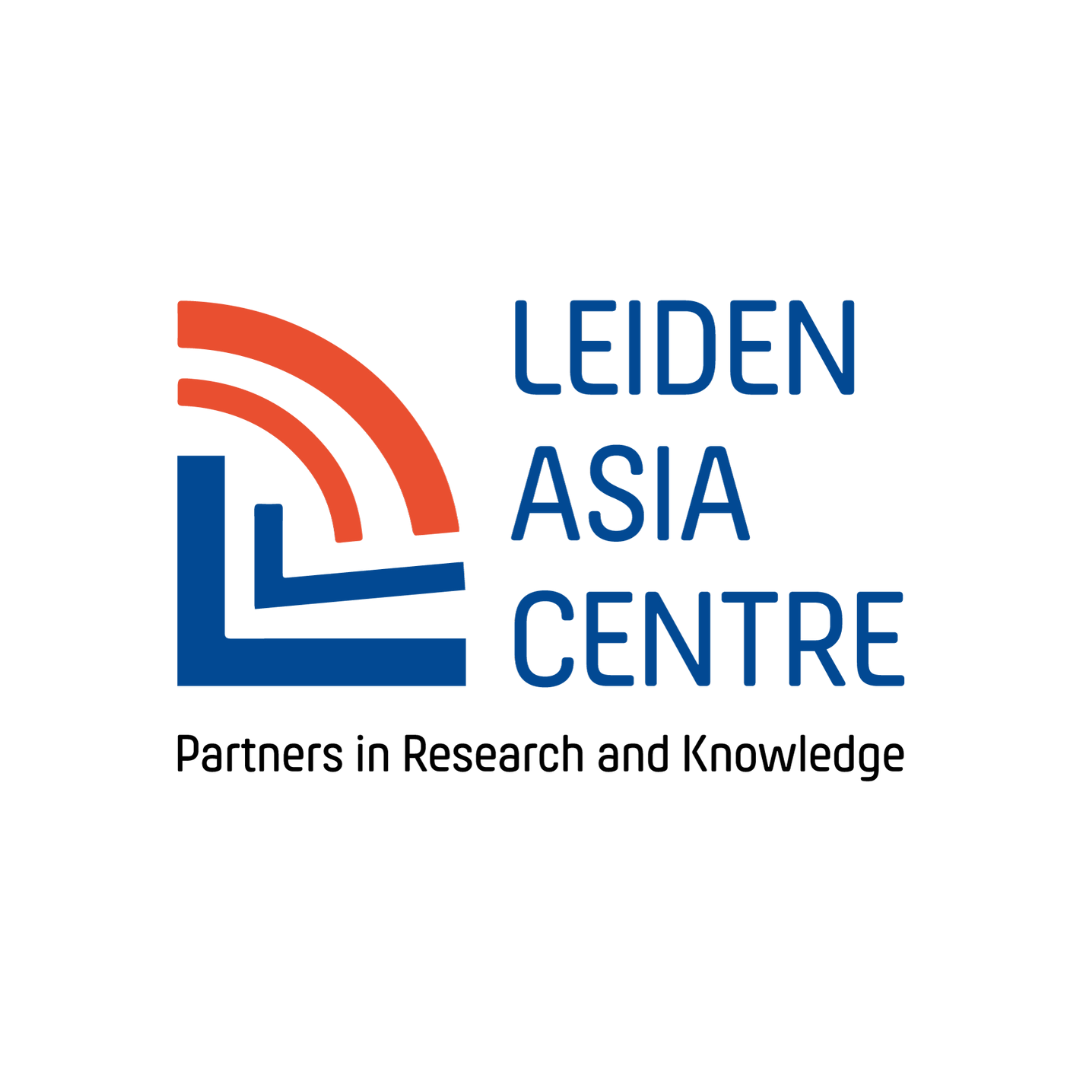
- Formation: 2016
- Location: Leiden, Netherlands
- Academic Director: Florian Schneider
- Executive Director: Floris Harm
- Website: https://leidenasiacentre.nl/

The Leiden Asia Centre is the Netherlands' expertise centre for socially relevant and applicable knowledge on contemporary East Asia. The centre was established in 2016 to address concrete questions from society about Asia. It conducts short-term and long-term research in close collaboration with partners from various sectors, including business, government bodies, and knowledge centres.

The institute is housed in the Huizingagebouw of Leiden University, in the city of Leiden, The Netherlands. Its research is headed by the centre’s academic director Florian Schneider and it is managed by executive director Floris Harm.

== Goals ==
The primary aim of the Leiden Asia Centre is to generate academic knowledge related to contemporary East Asia that can find practical applications in the Netherlands. Focusing mainly on East Asia initially, its scope has expanded to include South and Southeast Asia, notably India and the Indo-Pacific.

== Activities ==
The centre conducts research on various aspects of East Asia, including political, economic, cultural, and social issues, as well as developments surrounding technology and the environment. It collaborates closely with partners in society, fostering connections with businesses, government agencies, and other knowledge institutions. The Leiden Asia Centre actively shares its findings through events, courses, public engagements, and publications, such as its open-access book series with Amsterdam University Press and its publicly available research reports. Moreover, it serves as a hub for experts, policymakers, and practitioners interested in East Asia.

Besides continuing multiple research projects, the Leiden Asia Centre has co-hosted the secretariat of the Dutch China Knowledge Network since 2021, together with Instituut Clingendael.
