= HDWiki =

Chinese wiki software

HDWiki is a Chinese wiki software developed by the online encyclopedia Hudong. It is used by over 1000 websites in China.

== License and development ==
The source code for HDWiki is free for anyone to download without registration. HDWiki is free for non-commercial use, while commercial use requires a special licensing agreement from Hudong.

Despite the name "kaiyuan" (simplified Chinese: 开源; traditional Chinese: 開放; pinyin: kāiyuán; lit. 'open source') (implying "open-source" in Chinese) in the URL of the Hudong website, HDWiki is not open-source software.
