= Pan Haidong =

Chinese businessman

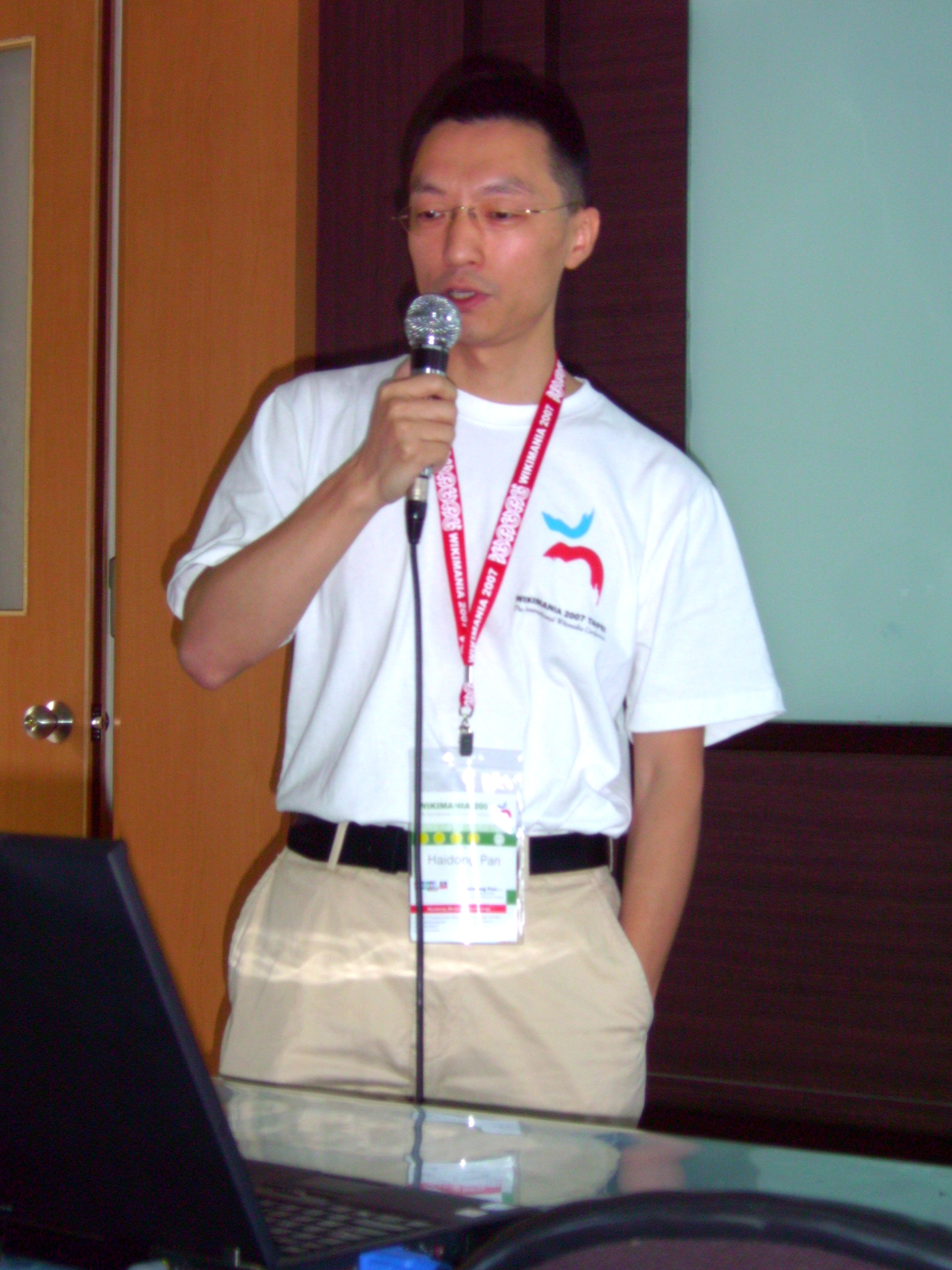
Pan Haidong at Wikimania 2007

Pan Haidong (潘海东; born 1974 in Dazhou, Sichuan) is the CEO of Chinese online encyclopedia Baike.com. Baike is the largest online encyclopedia in China as of 2009.

He attended the University of Science and Technology Beijing from 1991 to 1995.

He received his master's degree from Tsinghua University from 1995 to 1998.

He received his PhD from Boston University in the United States in 2002.

In June 2005 he established Hudong at Zhongguancun (Chinese silicon valley). He became the head of the company after receiving 100,000 yuan in funding.

In May 2006 he successfully entered the 2006 AAMA future technology cradle design.

== Interactive Encyclopedia ==
Haidong is the creator and current CEO of Interactive Encyclopedia.
