= Cantonese Wikipedia =

Cantonese-language edition of Wikipedia

Cantonese Wikipedia 粵文維基百科
- Website type: Internet encyclopedia project
- Available in: Cantonese
- Headquarters: Miami, Florida
- Owner: Wikimedia Foundation
- Website: zh-yue.wikipedia.org
- Commercial: No
- Registration: Optional
- Launched: 25 March 2006; 20 years ago
- Content license: Creative Commons Attribution/ Share-Alike 4.0 (most text also dual-licensed under GFDL); Media licensing varies

The Cantonese Wikipedia (Chinese: 粵文維基百科; Jyutping: jyut6 man4 wai4 gei1 baak3 fo1; Cantonese Yale: Yuhtmàhn Wàihgēi Baakfō) is the Cantonese-language edition of Wikipedia, run by the Wikimedia Foundation. It was started on 25 March 2006.

== History ==
Cantonese, a major Sinitic language originating in Guangzhou, is the lingua franca in Guangdong, Guangxi, Hong Kong, and Macau. Cantonese has the most well-developed written form of all Chinese languages apart from Mandarin and Classical Chinese.

With the advent of the computer and standardization of character sets specifically for Cantonese, many printed materials in predominantly Cantonese speaking areas of the world cater to their population using these written Cantonese characters.

According to the scholar Chaak-ming Lau, with over 40,000 articles, the Cantonese Wikipedia "is still by far the largest collection of written Cantonese articles to date".

== Naming ==
The Cantonese name of Wikipedia was decided in April 2006, following a vote. In a similar manner to the existing Chinese Wikipedia, the name of Cantonese Wikipedia (simplified Chinese: 维基百科; traditional Chinese: 維基百科; Jyutping: wai^{4} gei^{1} baak^{3} fo^{1}) means "Wiki Encyclopedia". The Chinese transcription of "Wiki" is composed of two characters: 維/维, whose ancient sense refers to "ropes or webs connecting objects", and alludes to the Internet; and 基, meaning "foundations of a building", or "fundamental aspects of things in general". The name can be interpreted as "the encyclopedia that connects the fundamental knowledge of humanity".

The discussion in 2006 also decided the Cantonese name of the word "Cantonese" in the wiki. The result was "粵語". In a vote from August to September 2013 it was decided that the name be changed to "粵文", which literally means "Cantonese inscription".

=== ISO code ===
At the time of establishment, there was no ISO code for Cantonese. Thus, zh-yue was used as the domain. However, some did not like the idea, as Yue is the Mandarin name of Cantonese. The native transliteration is Yuet. Cantonese preserves entering tone while Mandarin does not. Some suggested using Cantonese instead, but zh-yue was chosen as the final domain name.

The ISO code for Cantonese is yue. Using the ISO code instead of current domain has been submitted as a proposal to Wikimedia, but as of yet, no action has been taken to implement this change.

=== Native name ===
There are various native names of Cantonese, namely “Cantonese Cantonese” (廣州話; gwong^{2} zau^{1} waa^{6}; Gwóng jàu wá), “Canton Capital Cantonese” (廣府話; gwong^{2} fu^{2} waa^{6}; Gwóng fú wá), “Guangdong Cantonese” (廣東話; gwong^{2} dung^{1} waa^{6}; Gwóng dùng wá) and “Yue language” (粵語; jyut^{6} jyu^{5}; Yuht yúh). Cantonese Wikipedians thus use the four names interchangeably, namely 廣州話維基百科, 廣府話維基百科, 廣東話維基百科 and 粵語維基百科. There is no consensus on the native name.

== Community ==
Cantonese flourishes in the southern provinces of Guangdong and Guangxi, as well as in Hong Kong and Macau where it is listed as one of their official languages. Some Cantonese speakers are native to Vietnam, Thailand, Singapore, Malaysia, Indonesia, Australia, Canada, the United States and United Kingdom.

Hong Kong owns the largest written Cantonese assets and does not have tight internet censorship. Most editors are Hongkongers.

Starting from a small community, Cantonese Wikipedians have formed a consensus to follow, by default, the policies, guidelines, and customs of the English Wikipedia, wherever they are applicable. This consensus has provided stability and allows Wikipedians to concentrate on content.

As of 6 October 2026, the Cantonese Wikipedia has 2,469,844 edits, 154,221 articles, and more than 345,991 registered users, 9 of whom are administrators. Behind the Chinese Wikipedia, out of all Chinese-language Wikipedias, the Cantonese Wikipedia has the second-most number of articles, users, active users, and administrators.

=== Origin of edits ===
Origin of edits (December 2024) Source
Country/Region	% of edits
Hong Kong	59.4%
Other	40.6%

=== Origin of readers ===
Location of readers (December 2024) Source
Country/Region	% of views
Hong Kong	38.8%
Taiwan	13.5%
United States	11.1%
Canada	5.5%
Germany	4.3%
Other	26.8%

== Script ==
There are two different scripts of written Cantonese: Traditional Chinese and Simplified Chinese. Some Cantonese-specific characters can only be written in Traditional Chinese. Cantonese Wikipedia uses Traditional following Hong Kong and Macau in their traditional usage, because most of the participants came from Hong Kong when Cantonese Wikipedia was founded. But this led to a dissatisfaction among Simplified Chinese users (mainly Cantonese speakers in Guangdong). To solve this problem, a JavaScript converter was created and provided for viewing the content in Simplified Chinese characters.

Unlike Chinese Wikipedia (where replacing a form of writing with another in source text is prohibited), if an editor writes a page in Simplified characters, they will not receive any warning from administrators, but the text will be manually converted to Traditional characters.

== Other Chinese-language Wikipedias ==
Cantonese is a member of the group of Chinese varieties. Different Wikipedias have been established for different Chinese varieties (see below). The Cantonese Wikipedia is the second largest in this family.

- Chinese Wikipedia (based on Standard Chinese)
- Classical Chinese Wikipedia
- Southern Min Wikipedia
- Eastern Min Wikipedia
- Gan Wikipedia
- Wu Wikipedia
- Hakka Wikipedia

== See also ==
- Chinese encyclopedias

== Bibliography ==
- Dong, Hongyuan (2017). Zhang, Lan (ed.). "Language Policy, Dialect Writing and Linguistic Diversity" (PDF). Proceedings of the 29th North American Conference on Chinese Linguistics (NACCL-29). Vol. 2. Ohio State University. pp. 463–480. Archived from the original (PDF) on 28 August 2023.
- Lau, Chaak-ming (2019). "Building Cantonese Dictionaries Using Crowdsourcing Strategies: The words.hk Project". In Tso, Anna Wing-bo (ed.). Digital Humanities and New Ways of Teaching. Singapore: Springer Nature. ISBN 978-981-13-1276-2. ISSN 2520-8640 – via Google Books.
- Lee, Carmen (2017). Multilingualism Online. London: Routledge. ISBN 978-1-138-90048-6 – via Google Books.
