= 2022 Wikimedia Foundation actions against MENA Wikipedians =

On December 6, 2022, the Wikimedia Foundation took a series of measures against Arabic Wikipedia and Persian Wikipedia contributors in the Middle East and North Africa (MENA) region, which resulted in a total of 16 users being globally banned, (Note: A global ban is the formal revocation of editing and other access privileges across all projects operated by the WMF. It may be issued either by community consensus or by a unilateral decision of the WMF.) including seven administrators of Arabic Wikipedia. The Wikimedia Foundation stated that the Wikipedians were engaged in conflict-of-interest propaganda, while the human rights organization Democracy for the Arab World Now accused the Wikipedians of being controlled by the government of Saudi Arabia, and the action was related to the sentencing of two Arabic Wikipedians to 32 and 8 years respectively in Saudi Arabia in 2020.

== Background ==
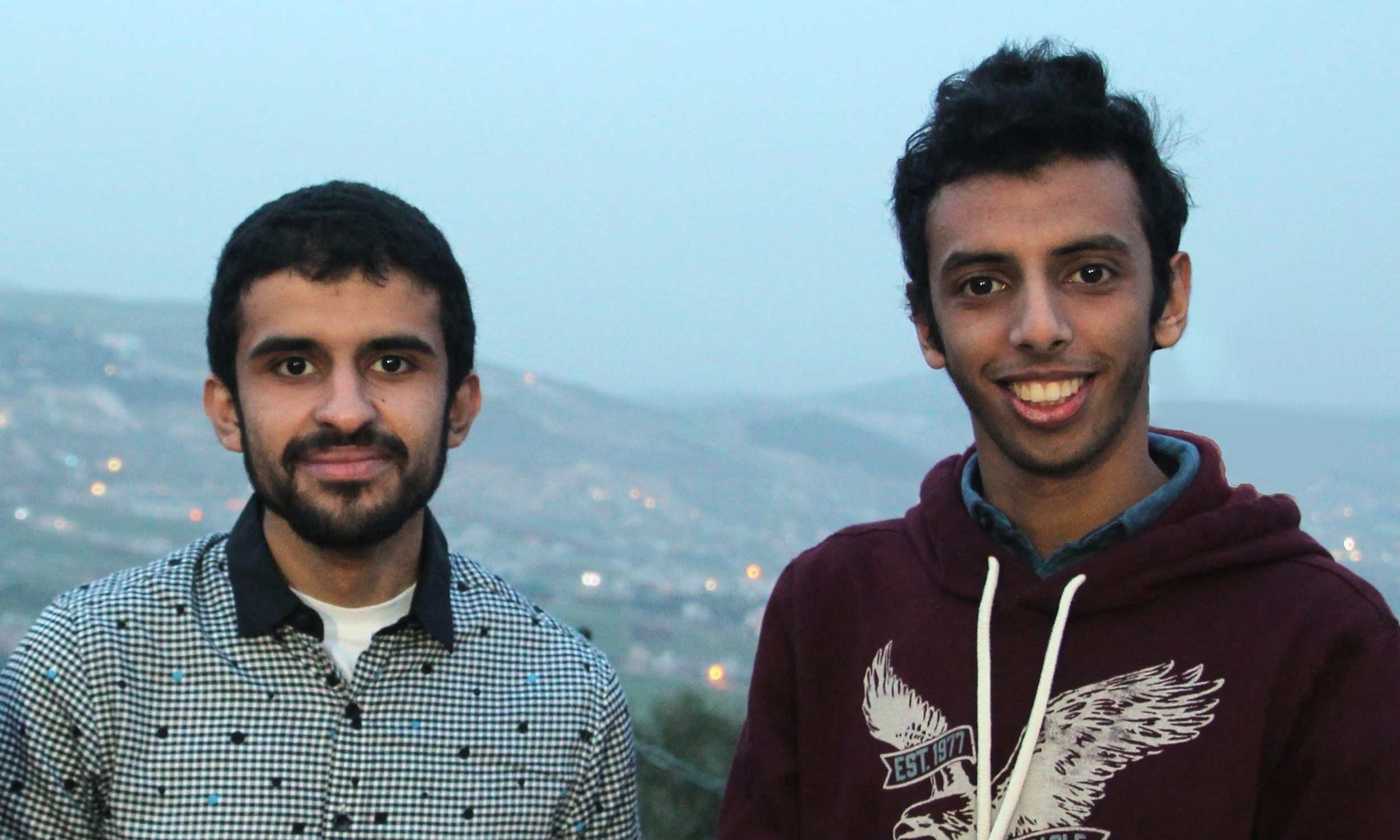
Osama Khalid (left) and Ziyad al-Sofiani (right), former administrators of the Arabic Wikipedia arrested by the Saudi Arabian government. Al-Sofiani was later released around 11 March 2025.

In September 2020, the Saudi Arabian government arrested Osama Khalid and Ziyad al-Sofiani, former administrators of the Arabic Wikipedia, on the same day, charging them with "dominating public opinion" and "violating public morals". The country's Specialized Criminal Court for prosecuting political prisoners sentenced them to five and eight years in prison, respectively, in Riyadh's Al-Ha'ir prison. In September 2022, the Specialized Criminal Court increased Khalid's sentence to 32 years on the same charges.

== Actions ==
The Wikimedia Foundation announced that, following an internal investigation that began in January 2022, 16 Wikipedians were globally banned across the board for conflict-of-interest editing since 14:50, December 6, 2022 (17:50 AST). The Wikimedia Foundation stated, "During that investigation, we were able to identify a number of users with close ties to external parties who were editing the platform in a coordinated manner to further the goals of those parties." In its January 9, 2023 statement, the Wikimedia Foundation denied that all 16 individuals were in Saudi Arabia, but did not make public any details of its findings and "conflict of interest editing". The Wikimedia Foundation added that prior to launching their investigation in January 2022, they suspected conflict-of-interest editing on Wikipedia projects in the MENA region.

Of the 16 banned users, at least 9 are from Saudi Arabia, including 7 administrators, all of whom are nationals of that country. One is Kuwaiti, but edits mainly pages related to Saudi Arabia. 10 users edit mainly on Arabic Wikipedia, 3 users edit mainly on Persian Wikipedia, and the remaining 3 users edit on both Persian and Arabic Wikipedia. All administrators based in Saudi Arabia have been banned by the Wikimedia Foundation.

Human rights groups have accused the blocked users of acting or being forced to act as agents of the Saudi Arabian government by "promoting positive content about the government and removing content critical of the government". Their edits included a softening of the tone on Jamal Khashoggi's murder, an entry promoting the Public Investment Fund, a profile of government minister Faisal Alibrahim, an entry on Crown Prince Mohammad bin Salman's "The Line" project, and an entry on the 2022 Iran–Greece naval incident. The Wikimedia Foundation, for its part, said it was "unlikely that this was the case" and found no evidence of infiltration, adding that some of the blocked users "may have been Saudi Arabian".

== Reactions ==
"The infiltration of Wikipedia is another example of the Saudi Arabian government's ongoing efforts to control online information and knowledge production in our region," said human rights activist Mohamed Najem. Another human rights activist, Sarah Leah Whitson, stated, "International organizations and corporations that think their subsidiaries can safely operate independently of the control of the Saudi Arabian government are deeply irresponsible."

The Arabic-speaking Wikipedia community expressed outrage at the action and called on the Wikimedia Foundation to create a more transparent model in which the community holds itself accountable.

== See also ==
- 2021 Wikimedia Foundation actions on the Chinese Wikipedia
