= Zhang Yiyi (author) =

Chinese novelist and reviewer (born 1981)

- 张一一
- Born: January 1, 1981 (age 45); Xiangyin County, Yueyang, Hunan, China
- Occupation: Novelist
- Writing career
- Language: Chinese
- Period: 2005–present
- Genre: Novel
- Notable works: I'm Not A Scum; Anti Dream of the Red Chamber; Seeing Countrymen with Three Eyes

Zhang Yiyi (simplified Chinese: 张一一; traditional Chinese: 張一一; pinyin: Zhāng Yīyī; born January 1, 1981) is a Chinese novelist and reviewer, who is famous for his hyping talent. In 2011, he was lampooned as the year's "top fool" in a list published by the China Internet Information Center after he compared himself to Confucius.

== Biography ==
Zhang was born in 1981 in Xiangyin County, Yueyang City, Hunan Province.

In 2005, Zhang's novel I'm Not A Scum (我不是人渣) was published.

In 2011, Zhang published his novels Anti Dream of the Red Chamber (反红楼梦) and The Lovely Chinese (可爱的中国人).

In 2012, Zhang wrote the book Seeing Countrymen with Three Eyes (带三只眼看国人).

In 2013, Zhang wrote a Fu The Chinese Communist Party (党赋) to celebrate the 92nd anniversary of the Chinese Communist Party.

== Works ==
- I'm Not Scum 我不是人渣 (in Chinese). Changjiang Publisher. 2005. ISBN 9787807080466.
- Be famous overnight 一夜成名 (in Chinese). Chinese Opera Publisher. 2006. ISBN 9787104023135.
- Anti Dream of the Red Chamber 反红楼梦 (in Chinese). 2011.
- The Lovely Chinese 可爱的中国人 (in Chinese). 2011.
- Seeing Countrymen with Three Eyes 带三只眼看国人 (in Chinese). Nanfang Publisher. 2012. ISBN 9787550106116.
