= Florian Schneider (professor) =

German academic

Florian Schneider is a German Sinologist, political scientist, and media studies scholar. He is Chair Professor of Modern China at Leiden University and academic director of the Leiden Asia Centre. His research interests include questions of governance and public administration in the PRC, Taiwan, and Hong Kong, political communication strategies and digital media politics in the Chinese-speaking world, as well as international relations in the East Asian region.

== Career & Scholarly Contributions ==
Florian Schneider studied Sinology, political science, and economics at Hamburg University until 2005, completed his PhD in Chinese Studies in 2009 at the University of Sheffield, and has worked at Leiden University since 2008.

Schneider has worked on numerous research projects that deal with politics, media, and digital technology in East Asia. He has published widely, in top-tier disciplinary journals such as Nations and Nationalism, New Media & Society, and The Review of International Studies, as well as in premier area studies journals such as The Journal of Asia Studies, the Journal of Contemporary China, and the Journal of Current Chinese Affairs.

His first book Visual Political Communication in Popular Chinese Television Series (2012) deals with the way in which "soap operas" contribute to political discourse in the People's Republic of China. This book was awarded the EastAsiaNet book award in 2014. The China Journal's review stressed the study's strong analysis of original audio-visual materials as well as its "in-depth ethnographic reflection upon the production end of popular TV series".

Schneider has continued this general interest in political communication in a follow-up projects that analyzed mass-media events like the 2008 Beijing Olympics and the 2010 Shanghai World Exposition, as well as the political relevance of such events in China; the monograph Staging China: The Politics of Mass Spectacle was published open-access with Leiden University Press in 2019 and was awarded the IBP 2021 Accolades in the Social Sciences. In The China Quarterly, Limin Liang described the book as "theoretically ambitious and empirically well-researched and written", but also asked for "a better summary of how cultural performances enter different alliances with 'social powers' – state, market or civil society – and in turn generate distinct trajectories". Susan Brownell called the book "the first comprehensive overview of mega events in China together with the discourses and cultural products that they have generated"; while she criticized the study's strong reliance on publicly available materials, commenting on the need to access behind-the-scenes accounts from China, she also stressed the book's "thought-provoking addition to existing theories of mega events".

Another of Schneider's projects examines how Chinese online networks affect official and popular nationalisms in the Chinese-speaking world. In 2012, his project to analyse this issue in the contest of Sino-Japanese relations received the prestigious VENI grant of the Dutch Research Council's talent programme. The subsequent book China's Digital Nationalism was published with Oxford University Press in 2018. Reviewers positively commented on the book's "rich first-hand data and innovative research tactics", its wide-reaching scope and "radically inclusive (.,..) interdisciplinary approach", and the "new theoretical concepts" that it develops. A central premise of the book has been that technological affordances shape community sentiments like nationalism; Christopher Hughes, while criticizing that Schneider could make more of the "oppositional politics" between state actors and online nationalists, has called this explorations of technological architectures its "most outstanding contribution". Schneider later expanded on and updated this work by conceptualizing how nationalist sentiments emerge from complex networked interactions, and by examining how specific social media environments create conformist pressures on nationalist discourses.

Aside from researching, Florian Schneider teaches undergraduate and graduate courses at Leiden University and supervises PhD projects on politics, media, and communication in contemporary China. In 2017, he was awarded Leiden University's Lecturer of the Year Award, for his innovative work as an educator.

Schneider is also one of the founders and the managing editor of Brill's academic journal Asiascape: Digital Asia, a member of the steering committee of the annual Chinese Internet Research Conference, and, since 2018, the academic director of the Leiden Asia Centre.
