= Aama, Nepal =

Place in Nepal

Aama आमा
- Village development committee
- Location in Nepal
- Coordinates: 27.42°N 83.26°E
- Country: Nepal
- Province: Lumbini Province
- District: Rupandehi District

Population (1991)
  - Total: 3,456
- Time zone: UTC+5:45 (Nepal Time)

Aama (Nepali: आमा) is a village development committee in Rupandehi District in Lumbini Province of southern Nepal. At the time of the 1991 Nepal census, it had a population of 3456 people living in 582 individual households. A farming village and community, Aama is located to the south of Lumbini.
