= China Computer Education =

Chinese weekly computer magazine

China Computer Education (Chinese: 中国电脑教育报; pinyin: Zhōngguó diànnǎo jiàoyù bào) is a 50-page weekly computer magazine published in mainland China.

== History and profile ==
China Computer Education was started in 1993. It is published by the China Center for Information Industry Development (中国电子信息产业发展研究院; CCID) and managed by the Ministry of Industry and Information Technology of the People's Republic of China. Commonly referred to as "CCE", the majority of its readers are teachers and students of information technology and computer science. The content of the magazine involves product testing, computer hardware, software applications, news and commentary, and the submission of student papers. The magazine has a single-issue circulation of 350,000 copies, and is the largest IT media publication in mass circulation within China.

From 20 May 2013 onwards, the magazine was renamed China Information Weekly (Chinese: 中国信息化周报).
