= Baidu Baike =

Chinese wiki-based online encyclopedia

Baidu Baike 百度百科
- Baidu Baike logo (top) and BaiduWiki logo (bottom)

- The main page, on 1 February 2016
- Website type: Online encyclopedia
- Available in: Standard Chinese
- Founded: 2006
- Headquarters: Beijing, China
- Owner: Baidu
- Creator: Robin Li
- Website: baike.baidu.com
- Commercial: Yes
- Registration: Optional (required to edit pages)
- Users: +8.03 million (2026)
- Current status: Active

Chinese name
- Chinese: 百度百科
Transcriptions
Standard Mandarin
- Hanyu Pinyin: Bǎidù Bǎikē
- IPA: [pàɪ.tû.pàɪ.kʰɤ́]
Yue: Cantonese
- Jyutping: baak^{3} dou^{6} baak^{3} fo^{1}

Baidu Baike (/ˈbaɪduː ˈbaɪkə/; Chinese: 百度百科; pinyin: Bǎidù Bǎikē; lit. 'Baidu Encyclopedia', also known as BaiduWiki internationally) is a semi-regulated Chinese-language collaborative online encyclopedia owned by the Chinese technology company Baidu. Modelled after Wikipedia, it was launched in April 2006. As of 2025, it claims more than 30 million entries and around 8.03 million editors – the largest number of entries of any Chinese-language online encyclopedia. Baidu Baike has been criticised for its censorship, copyright violations, commercialist practices and unsourced or inaccurate information.

== History ==
Baidu Baike was created by Baidu founder Robin Li, and was released to the public around 20 April 2006, following the Chinese government's decision to censor Wikipedia in 2005. After 20 days, it had more than 300,000 registered users and more than 100,000 articles, surpassing the number in Chinese Wikipedia.

During the conference WWW2008 of the World Wide Web Consortium, Baidu's William Chang said, "There is, in fact, no reason for China to use Wikipedia ... It's very natural for China to make its own products." When searching with the search engine Baidu, the link to the corresponding entry in Baidu Baike, if it exists, will be put as the first result or one of the first results. The Chinese government has, through the Great Firewall, blocked access to all editions of Wikipedia since 2019.

In 2015, the "Baike Youming" service was launched, a paid commercial service that allowed figures such as entrepreneurs and artists to control their biographies and provide personally verified information.

In March 2021, Chinese netizens claimed that South Korean netizens changed their entries related to Chinese history on a large scale through the historical version comparison function of Baidu Baike. Baidu Baike stipulates that the historical version function is only available to users of the "Baike Expert Group" with a level 4 encyclopedia and a pass rate of over 85% and professional users with a level 6 encyclopedia and a pass rate of over 85%. Open, ordinary users no longer have the right to view historical versions of entries and use the historical version comparison function. Baidu Encyclopedia officially claims that this is to "ensure that the majority of netizens obtain the accuracy of entry information and avoid interference from outdated information in various historical versions".

On 24 April 2024, Baidu posted an announcement on Baidu Baike that it would end support for the Baidu Baike dedicated mobile app on 30 June to focus on "better user experiences". Also in 2024, it was announced that AI features would be integrated into the platform.

As of 2024, Baidu Baike had over 27 million articles, with its homepage drawing 295 million views a month. Baidu Baike reached 30 million articles in 2025. In the mid 2020s, Baidu Baike faced challenges from large language model-based AI assistants supplanting the need for users to consult Baidu Baike for information, as part of a broader decline in traffic to text-based web content.

In February 2026, Baidu Baike launched BaiduWiki, an international version of Baidu Baike available in English, Japanese, French, Spanish, and Russian, with over 1 million articles available at launch, which had been translated from the original Chinese versions with the help of AI tools. The launch of BaiduWiki marks the expansion of Baidu's single-language version to a Chinese version and an international multilingual version.

== Features ==
Baidu has officially described Baidu Baike as an information repository provided by the company for internet users. The platform promotes the principles of "equality, collaboration, sharing, and freedom." Only registered users can edit the articles. Baidu Baike is integrated with Baidu's search engine, and when a searched term has a corresponding entry on Baidu Baike, the link to that entry is typically prioritized at the top of the search results. In April 2024, Baidu shut down the Baidu Baike mobile app, but not the encyclopedia itself.

Editing Baidu Baike articles requires registration of an account, and all edits are at least nominally reviewed prior to publication. A 2016 article in Securities Times suggested that the review process is for the most part machine automated.

In Baidu Baike's articles, headings, bolding text styles and hyperlinks to other entries are supported. Each heading can be listened to (播报; lit. 'broadcast') separately. The references that are used are listed at the bottom of each page. The site supports editing, commenting, printing articles and viewing an article's history.Users can access multiple editing functions, including:

- an image upload system where files weighing less than 2 MB can be added to encyclopedia articles;
- a categorization system called "open category", where an article can be categorized into up to 5 categories; and
- a separate edit box for notes, references and external links.

Topics referred to by multiple names have articles at the most common titles, with other names being redirected to the article. Words or phrases with multiple meanings often have only a single article which covers all of the topics. Many (but not all) articles have infoboxes containing important information, similar to Wikipedia.

Baidu Baike has a system of ranking articles as "high quality" after undergoing review.

Baidu does not allow the encyclopedia to update between 23:00 and 8:30 Beijing time, ostensibly for the health of the encyclopedia's volunteers, but this may actually be to ease management of the auditing process for edits.

Prior to 2018 Baidu Baike lacked an equivalent of Wikipedia talk pages for individual articles. Discussion pages for individual Baidu Baike articles was later implemented in November 2018. Prior to this (as well as after), discussion between Baidu Baike users took place on Baidu Tieba, another Baidu service.

By 2014, Baidu Baike was assigning QR codes to individual articles, allowing Baidu Baike articles to be linked from physical locations. By 2016, nearly 100,000 physical Baidu Baike QR codes had been placed in over 200 locations across China.

Around 2016 Baidu Baike allowed users to send virtual "flowers" on the biographies of celebrities, with the number of flowers being used to collate a ranking of their popularity. In 2016, Baidu Baike implemented "Miaodong Baike", a feature allowing users to create 1 minute long short-form videos for articles to summarise their contents. More than 50,000 videos were uploaded 100 days after launch, and the view count for Miaodong Baike had grown from 7 million daily views at the start of 2018 to 50 million views per day by the end of that year. In 2024, an AI chatbot was added allowing users to have simulated conversations with historical figures. As part of the 2020s AI boom, by 2026 AI began to be used in the drafting process for articles, particularly in certain topics such as medicine. It also launched "Dynamic Encyclopedia" (动态百科) which provided interactive elements, such as an interactive model of the Solar System with orbits that updated to match the current time.

=== Copyright ===
The copyright policy is outlined on the Help page in the terms of use section. In it, Baidu states that by adding content to the site, users agree to waive the copyright of their contributions to Baidu. It also states that the content must not violate intellectual property law and that content using the Creative Commons and/or GNU Free Documentation License (GFDL) must respect the limitations of such licenses. Despite this, Baidu has received criticism for violating the GFDL license when using content directly from Wikipedia, infringing copyright on Hudong.com and tending to plagiarize other sites.

=== Community ===
Like other online encyclopedias, a relatively small proportion of the users contribute the majority of the content. According to a survey published in 2011, the majority of responding editors (72.2%) were male, and 66.7% of the contributors were between the ages of 18 and 35, with only 4.8% over the age of 45. A survey published in 2017 found broadly similar demographics, with most editors reporting having a high level of income and at least a bachelor's degree. There are a few organized groups within the Baidu Baike community. The Baike Elite Team consists of about 340 core contributors that are directed by Baidu and serve as community liaisons. There is also a group of campus ambassadors made of students and an expert team with over 2,500 members, including university professors. Baidu Baike has a hierarchical structure, where users accrue "experience credits" via editing and creating articles, reaching a higher rank at certain experience point levels, with 15 ranks total as of 2014. Alongside experience points, users also accumulate "gift points" for the same actions, which allow users to acquire physical goods (ranging from cheap items like snacks and stationery, all the way up to electronic appliances like fridges, washing machines and smartphones) from Baidu with the accrued points. Users who have achieved 2,500 experience points and have the vast majority (>85%) of their edits approved by Baidu can be manually elevated by Baidu employees to the rank of "core" user, giving them special privileges (such as having a logo on their ID marking them as a core user), with groups of "core users", forming "tadpole teams". Members of "tadpole teams" are allowed to have their own workspaces, similar to Wikipedia user pages.

Like other wikis, participants of Baidu Baike become embroiled in edit wars due to conflicts over article content.

Baidu Baike allows expert editors such as academics to verify their real identity.

As of 2024, it has around 7.7 million registered users.

== Influence and partnerships ==
Baidu Baike ranks highly in the search results of Baidu's flagship search engine, the dominant search engine in the Chinese market, which contributes greatly to its popularity. Baidu Baike is widely used within China, often where people go first to look up information. It has been cited in thousands of academic papers, though considerably less so than Wikipedia or the Encyclopædia Britannica. Baidu Baike engages in partnerships with cultural institutions in China and abroad to digitize cultural heritage. In late 2017, Baidu signed an agreement in China to create "2,000 online digital museums" in the next three years. In early 2018, partnerships were expanded to cover 1,000 Spanish cities and tourist sites, including the Camino de Santiago, the Sagrada Família and the Prado Museum. In 2022, it collaborated with the Institute of Vertebrate Paleontology and Paleoanthropology and Chinese Academy of Sciences to create articles about several fossil fish species from China.

Baidu Baike has widely been used as training data for major large language models.

== Reception ==
Baidu Baike has been praised for the great quantity of information it contains, but it has been criticised for being censored (which is mandated by the Chinese government), copyright violations as well as a lack of accuracy and commercialisation.

=== Censorship ===
Critics of the encyclopedia note that it censors its content in accordance with the requirements of the Chinese government. Being in the jurisdiction of the Chinese government, Baidu is required to censor content on their encyclopedia in accordance to relevant laws and regulations such as the Cybersecurity Law of the People's Republic of China and the National Intelligence Law. All editors must register accounts using their real names before editing, and administrators review all edits before they become available to the public. As of 2013, entries about senior Chinese political leaders, as well as articles about Baidu and its CEO Robin Li (as well as some businesses affiliated with Baidu), are entirely locked and not allowed to be edited by ordinary volunteers. In 2013, articles about politically sensitive events, such as the Tiananmen Square protests of 1989, were entirely absent. Articles that contain certain blacklisted sensitive words will not be published, neither will any negative content about Chinese government officials. In articles about sensitive topics such as Chinese government officials or the military, only official government sources, such as CCP-operated newspapers, are allowed to be used. In 2013, Citizen Lab released a report saying that censorship is known to take place on Baidu Baike but "identifying outright instances or patterns in censorship can be difficult due to the (mostly) user-generated nature and oversight of the content."

More broadly, the review process has been criticised as opaque and arbitrary, with seemingly uncontentious edits being rejected by Baidu for unclear reasons.

=== Copyright infringement allegations ===
Baidu Baike users have copied significant numbers of articles from Wikipedia into Baidu Baike without properly attributing it to its original source, violating the terms of Wikipedia's license. In 2007, Florence Devouard, then chair of the Board of Trustees of the Wikimedia Foundation, said that "They [Baidu Baike] do not respect the license at all, [...] That might be the biggest copyright violation we have. We have others." Users of the Chinese Wikipedia created a list of entries allegedly infringing Wikipedia's copyright. The Wikimedia Foundation decided not to pursue any legal action. In response to criticism, Baidu stressed that Baike is a platform for user-generated content. In addition to copying Wikipedia, some Baidu Baike users plagiarise newspaper reporting or content from internet sites to create articles.

=== Unsourced and inaccurate information ===
In addition to copyright concerns, criticism of Baidu Baike mainly focuses on its academic merits and lack of neutrality. The former is manifested in the lack of detailed and clear source references for the entries it contains, leading to the accuracy of its content being questioned. The quality of Baidu Baike articles is considered to vary widely between entries. Baidu Baike has many entries on topics that would not be considered notable by Wikipedia standards, with an article in the People's Daily (the official newspaper of the Chinese Communist Party) from 2016 stating that the website had many "junk" entries. According to Zhang (2014), the fact that contributors receive monetarily valuable rewards merely for the act of editing and creating articles regardless of their actual quality incentivises the creation of low quality content. In a 2017 article in The Point, Chenxin Jiang unfavourably compared Baidu Baike's reliability to Wikipedia, stating that the website was a "virtual quagmire of arbitrary opinions and what one might call fake facts." and that "much of [Baidu Baike's content] is bizarre or just plain wrong", noting several instances of clear errors or dubious unsourced information (including a fake quote from Bill Clinton describing Obama as "the worst president in American history"), some of which were widely copied by other Chinese websites. As of 2013, the average article has been edited around 3.5 times. Like other online wiki-like encyclopedias, the contributors to Baidu Baike vary in their knowledge and the quality of their contributions. Students often treat the information contained in Baidu Baike uncritically, despite its issues with reliability, though its content is considered with skepticism by many members of the general public. Over time, Baidu Baike has attempted to improve the standards of encyclopedia entries.

Analyses of its coverage of history, as well as medical information, have considered its coverage generally inferior to that of the English Wikipedia. In a 2018 journal article, Florian Schneider considered the Baidu Baike article on the Nanjing Massacre better written than its Chinese Wikipedia counterpart, but noted that it displayed an overt nationalistic bias, and (in contrast to the Chinese Wikipedia entry) largely omitted the academic controversy over the number of casualties, supporting the higher casualty numbers preferred by the PRC government.

In 2012, a Chinese gynaecologist attempted to correct information on Baidu Baike's article about the medical condition cervical ectropion, but his edit was not approved by Baidu's auditors. After a media outcry, Baidu implemented a system allowing only licensed medical professionals to edit articles about medical topics.

Around 2012, a list was created for "10 prestigious schools in China", which became the subject of controversy and edit warring, with universities being added or removed by individual editors who wished to promote their alma mater. After 34 edit changes, the page was locked by Baidu around 2014 and deleted, citing no clear criteria exist for the listing.

In 2014, there was edit warring over the entry regarding paraxylene following an industrial accident involving the chemical, with users repeatedly changing the entry to inaccurately say the substance was "highly toxic" when it was only mildly toxic, with students from Tsinghua University collaborating to repeatedly correct the entry. In 2017, the article on aristolochic acid was criticised after it erroneously described the substance as having "anti-cancer" properties when it was actually carcinogenic (cancer-causing).

A 2016 article in the People's Daily criticised Baidu Baike for having articles that promoted pseudoscientific concepts, such as human levitation, with a 2017 Science and Technology Daily (the official newspaper of the Chinese government Ministry of Science and Technology) article noting that Baidu Baike described bioresonance therapy as effective, while Wikipedia correctly described it as pseudoscience. In 2017, Baidu Baike was criticised for having a long entry dedicated to the concept of "earthquake clouds" (a type of cloud that purportedly appears before earthquakes) treating the existence of these clouds as factual, which was only cited to a single false reference, when the concept is widely rejected among mainstream scientists. During the 2017 Jiuzhaigou earthquake, residents of the local area reported seeing "earthquake clouds", bringing the concept to wider attention. Following pressure from the Chinese Academy of Sciences and China Association for Science and Technology, the entry was corrected by experts.

Also in 2017, Baidu Baike was criticised for erroneously putting an image of fraudster Wu Ying illustrating the article about the unrelated fraudster Su Ye Nu.

People who are subjects of articles on Baidu Baike have complained that correcting errors in their entries is burdensome, requiring supporting documents and even facial recognition to verify their identity, and that Baidu Baike contains articles on low-profile individuals that can be perceived as privacy violations by their subjects, and that such entries are difficult to get deleted.

Following the public release of large language model (LLM) based-AI text generation software in 2022, Baidu Baike users began to complain about the widespread insertion of AI-generated text into Baidu Baike articles which contained factual errors.

==== Hoaxes ====
Baidu 10 Mythical Creatures was a humorous hoax and internet meme originating from Baidu Baike in 2009, where users created articles about fictional creatures that were homonyms of Chinese profanities (Grass Mud Horse (cǎo ní mǎ) for example being a homophone for "fuck your mother" (cào nǐ mā)). According to Zhang (2014), Baidu Baike suffers from having a large number of hoax articles, which are often disguised spoofs of political events. These have on occasion been repeated in the Chinese media. A notable example is the "High Speed Rail" hoax from 2010, in which a fictitious Chinese professor was claimed to oppose China's high-speed-rail using the same speech style as a prominent real opponent of the Three Gorges Dam project, claiming that a fictitious "Xiaerxiefu force" and "Steven King effect" made high-speed rail extremely dangerous. After the hoax went viral elsewhere on the Chinese internet, it was quickly incorporated in the Baidu Baike's high speed rail article. Despite being debunked at the time (with the author admitting to the hoax), the hoax remained in Baidu Baike until July 2011, when it was quoted by a newspaper, following which the entry was deleted. In 2013, China Central Television erroneously claimed in a documentary that the Soviet campaign during the Prague Spring was called "Yuri's revenge", which a hoaxster had added to Baidu Baike in reference to the video game Command & Conquer: Yuri's Revenge. According to Zhang, outside of political topics, the auditing for content is lax, meaning that non-explicitly political hoaxes often go undetected.

In 2015, Southern Metropolis Daily reported that a security guard had pretended to be the bodyguard portrayed by Jet Li in the 1994 film The Bodyguard from Beijing, creating a Baidu Baike page to support his claims. He had used the Baidu Baike entry, which was regarded as authoritative, to allegedly defraud people. He later claimed that he merely used the name of the bodyguard in the film as a stage name. In 2021, The Paper reported that a scammer had a Baidu Baike entry that falsely described him as "head of the Office of the Leading Group for the Development of the Guangdong-Hong Kong-Macao Greater Bay Area" among other various fictitious positions sourced to press releases from a company operated by the scammer. The "National Development and Reform Commission" subsequently put out a warning that the information was fake and that the individual did not hold the positions claimed. In 2022, a hoax article about a fictitious entertainer "Wang Junyi" was deleted from Baidu Baike. The hoax had been circulating on the Chinese internet since 2016, and several other Chinese websites had entries dedicated to him.

=== Paid and promotional editing ===
According to Zhang (2014) Baidu Baike suffers from problems with promotional editing, with overt promotional and advertising material regularly inserted into articles despite pre-publication auditing. Zhang recounted that in the entries regarding cervical ectropion, lupus erythematosus and genital warts, editors affiliated with hospitals regularly added advertisements to their own services and deleted those of rival hospitals. Following the implementation of the restriction of only allowing medical professionals to edit medicine-related articles, Baidu's partners inserted their own promotional content into relevant articles. Black market paid editing companies exist to add promotional content to Baidu Baike on behalf of clients, including editing existing articles as well as creating new articles. Some of these companies fraudulently claim to have a relationship with Baidu. Baidu has launched repeated crackdowns on paid editing, removing articles and getting Taobao to remove listings on its website offering paid editing services. In 2016, in response to complaints that SEO and third-party vendors were soliciting payments to fix errors on Baidu Baike or promote certain rankings, Baidu Baike clarified that it is not officially affiliated with such services.

In 2016, it was reported that businesses were complaining about the slow rate of approval for requested changes to their articles such as updates to company information and revenue, with businesses reportedly pressured to upgrade to the 6,000 yuan per year "Baidu Enterprise" service to expedite the processes, which was seen as an indirect way of forcing them to pay to update their entries.

The Baidu Baike entry of the peer-to-peer lending company Ezubao, which eventually was revealed to be a Ponzi scheme, was repeatedly edited to remove negative information, presenting the company as a low-risk investment.

== Litigation ==
Baidu Baike has been the subject of a number of legal cases.

=== Legal action brought by Baidu ===
In 2010, the head of Hudong Baike (a rival wiki-like encyclopedia, also known as Baike.com) Pan Haidong made a post to Weibo entitled "Three Questions to [Baidu CEO] Robin Li", questioning the high search ranking that Baidu (the dominant search engine in China) gave to its own services, including Baidu Baike over those of rival companies. Baidu sued Pan in response, with Baidu eventually winning the resulting court case, with the court ordering Pan to pay 120,000 yuan to Baidu. In 2025, ByteDance subsidiary Douyin Baike (formerly Hudong Baike, which had been purchased by ByteDance in 2019 and subsequently renamed) was found guilty in a Beijing court of illegally copying 600,000 entries from Baidu Baike, creating fabricated user data to make it seem that this action had been done by ordinary users, and was ordered to pay 8 million yuan (the equivalent of around $1 million USD) in damages.

=== Legal action against Baidu ===
In 2011, Baidu was sued by Hudong Baike for monopolistic practices, alleging that Baidu Search downranked results for Baike.com in favour of Baidu Baike. Also in 2011, Baidu was sued by writer Zhang Yiyi for his Baidu Baike entry containing what he considered outdated, incorrect and defamatory content, including claiming that he was "good at self-hype in a shameless way that makes things out of nothing and attracts disdain, in order to achieve the purpose of attracting people's attention". In 2017, Zhang Yiyi again sued Baidu over the lack of the inclusion of his novels in his encyclopedia entry. In 2015 Baidu was sued after a Chinese woman lost nearly 500,000 yuan to a scammer after calling a fake customer support number listed on Baidu Baike. Prior to 2015, it had been successfully sued several times for privacy violations. Also in 2015, Chinese comedian Xu Deliang sued over allegations that he "never graduated from college and did not write his own material" being repeatedly inserted into his biography. He demanded that Baidu Baike remove the biography and disallow one from being created again. In 2019, Baidu was found guilty of defamation after a word meaning "traitor to one's culture" was inserted into the Baidu Baike biography of late "playwright, screenwriter, and composer" Zhao Zhong in 2013 which was left unaltered on the page for five years.

== See also ==
- BaiduWiki
- Chinese encyclopedias
- List of online encyclopedias
- Ruwiki (Wikipedia fork), a fork of the Russian Wikipedia
- Chinese Wikipedia
