= Asia America Multitechnology Association =

US non-profit organization

The Asia America Multitechnology Association (AAMA) is a non-profit organization committed to the Asia American high-tech community. It was founded in 1979. It is based in Silicon Valley and represents more than 1,100 members from about 800 companies. It holds meetings on the 4th Tuesday of every month for its members to network and promote business ties between Asia and Silicon Valley. The current President is William A. Chen.
