= Baike.com =

For-profit user-generated encyclopedia in China

Douyin Baike 抖音百科

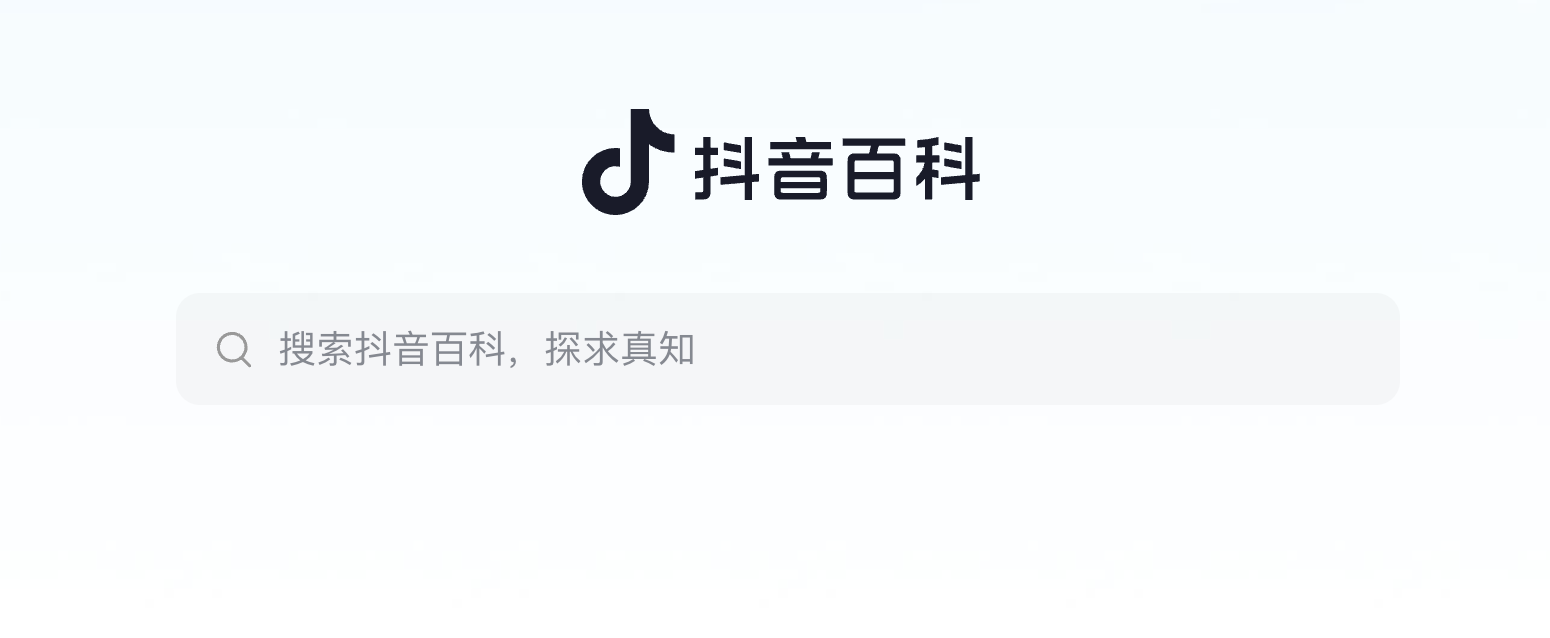
- Website type: Social network with wiki-based encyclopedia, chat forums, and bulletin boards
- Available in: Chinese
- Headquarters: Beijing
- Owner: ByteDance
- Creator: Pan Haidong (CEO)
- Website: baike.com
- Commercial: Yes
- Registration: Optional (required to edit pages)
- Launched: 19 June 2005; 21 years ago
- Current status: Perpetual work-in-progress

Douyin Baike (Chinese: 抖音百科; pinyin: dǒu yīn bǎi kē), formerly known as Hudong Baike (Chinese: 互动百科, also sometimes spelled Hoodong and also known as Baike.com), is a for-profit Chinese-language user-editable online encyclopedia and social network owned by ByteDance. Founded in 2005 in emulation of Wikipedia, it is one of the two largest wikis in China, along with its more prominent rival, Baidu Baike.

== Features and business model ==
Baike.com is a wiki and lets its users edit and contribute material. Frequent users may accumulate credits redeemable for gifts. It has also included features of social networking sites, including chat forums and fan groups. Baike.com is a for-profit business partially supported by advertising and paid support services.

Hudong Baike developed its own wiki software platform, called HDWiki, as a rival to MediaWiki. It also released YELLOWIKI, a classifieds platform.

The HDWiki software is free for non-commercial use, has been downloaded 200,000 times and currently supports over 1,000 other web sites in China (as of December 2007), consisting mostly of tech researchers, software groups, government, universities, and high school students.

Although Hudong Baike tried to branch out into software as a service, it was primarily reliant on advertising for revenue.

== History ==
Baike.com was founded in 2005 by CEO Pan Haidong who had moved back to China after earning a PhD in systems engineering from Boston University in 2002. Haidong acknowledged that the project was inspired by Wikipedia, stating in 2009 "Of course we are a copycat of Wikipedia", though arguing that the encyclopedia had its own distinct innovations. In 2006, it obtained $3 million in funding in a financing round. During the late 2000s Hudong Baike grew significantly while Chinese Wikipedia (which was founded earlier in 2002) suffered being intermittently blocked, sometimes for years at a time, by the Chinese government. In 2009, Hudong Baike boasted of having 2 million articles and 1.7 million active users.

In 2010, Pan Haidong made a post to Weibo entitled "Three Questions to [Baidu CEO] Robin Li", questioning the high search ranking that Baidu (the dominant search engine in China) gave to its own services, including Baidu Baike, (another user-generated Wikipedia-like encyclopedia founded in 2006), over those of rival companies. Baidu sued Pan in response, with Baidu eventually winning the resulting court case, with the court ordering Pan to pay 120,000 yuan to Baidu. On 22 February 2011, Baike.com submitted a complaint to the State Administration for Industry and Commerce asking for a review of the behavior of Baidu, accusing it of being monopolistic.

In 2011, it was announced that Draper Fisher Jurvetson had invested $15 million into Hudong Baike. In December 2012, the company changed its English name from Hudong to Baike.com. In 2012, in an attempt to improve article quality, Hudong Baike convened a "Scientific Advisory Group," including several university professors among others. In an attempt to increase user retention, Hudong Baike became less focused on written encyclopedia content, with its homepage increasingly featuring portals to video and picture content. Hudong Baike had several controversies related to plagiarism, including in 2011 the founder of technology portal Guokr.com complaining that an article featured on Hudong Baike's front page was essentially taken wholesale without permission from an article on Guokr.com.

At the end of the 2000s and during the 2010s, Hudong Baike struggled to compete with Baidu Baike (as well to a lesser extent Sogou Baike, another Chinese wiki encyclopedia) because it lacked search engine integration, resulting in it falling behind in users and content creation. Baike.com began offering small payments to college students to write entries. As the Chinese internet became more dependent on walled garden app ecosystems throughout the 2010s, Baike.com declined further.

Between 2013 and 2015, the annual operating revenue of the company grew from 47.77 million yuan to 60.27 million yuan. In 2015, Samsung invested 16.8 million yuan into Hudong Baike. That year, the company had around 150 employees, most of which were in sales. In 2016, the shares of the company became listed on the National Equities Exchange and Quotations (NEEQ).

In 2017, the company became the subject of major controversy as a result of an investigation on the China Central Television (CCTV, a Chinese government-run broadcaster) consumer rights programme "The 3.15 Show", which found that the encyclopedia had a "pay for creation" system that allowed users who paid a fee to create articles with effectively no oversight, including one advertisement-like article on an unregulated supplement which claimed to cure cancer. This exposé severely damaged the credibility of Hudong Baike, causing its annual profits to plummet from 10.2805 million yuan to only 3.96 million yuan.

In 2019, the company was acquired by Chinese technology conglomerate ByteDance. The encyclopedia was subsequently renamed several times, being renamed to Douyin Baike in 2024 (Douyin is the Chinese version of the short-term video platform TikTok). By the time of its acquisition by ByteDance, Baike.com was far less popular than Baidu Baike, having only around 7% of Baidu Baike's daily viewership (8.6 million vs 130 million daily views). In 2025, Douyin Baike was found guilty in a Beijing court of illegally copying 600,000 entries from Baidu Baike, creating fabricated user data to make it seem that this action had been done by ordinary users, and was ordered to pay 8 million yuan (the equivalent of around US$1 million) in damages.

== See also ==
- Chinese Wikipedia
