= Wikimedia censorship in mainland China =

The censorship of Wikimedia in mainland China means that the government of the People's Republic of China and network operators in mainland China have used technical means since June 2004 to prevent netizens in mainland China from accessing some or all project websites under the Wikimedia Foundation, such as the Chinese Wikipedia. There was no warning from any department before these blockings and no explanation was given after the occurrence. The reason behind the blocking is believed to be the Chinese government's crackdown on sensitive content in Wikimedia Foundation projects.

== Blockade history ==
=== 2004–2008: Several blockades and reversals ===
On June 3, 2004, Wikipedia was blocked in some cities in mainland China (such as Beijing), but Wiktionary was still available. On June 11, other Wikimedia projects were blocked. On June 17, the IP address block appeared to have been lifted, but the website was still inaccessible to some. On June 18, all of Wikipedia except the Chinese version was unblocked, and the status of the Chinese version was unknown. On June 20, Beijing's access to Chinese Wikipedia still seemed abnormal. The blockade was lifted on June 21. On September 23, Wikipedia was partially blocked.

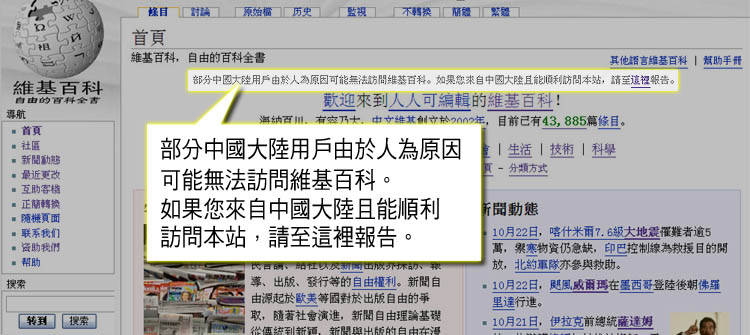
The Chinese Wikipedia added a notice that the Chinese government had blocked it to the welcome message on its homepage (October 2005).

On November 9, 2006, many users reported that the Chinese Wikipedia had been unblocked, which was the first time users in mainland China could re-access it since the blockade lasted for over a year on October 19, 2005.

In April 2008, all language versions except Chinese Wikipedia were unblocked.

=== 2010–2013: Blocking of Chinese-language Wikimedia projects and encrypted connections ===
On November 28, 2010, the Chinese version of Wikisurvey plaintext (HTTP) was blocked by the HTTP connection reset, but the encrypted version (HTTPS) can still be viewed commonly. In early 2012, Chinese Wikinews was blocked by HTTP connection reset and DNS contamination, which has yet to be lifted.

At the end of May 2013, the encrypted version (HTTPS) of Wikipedia in various languages became inaccessible in mainland China, while the plaintext version (HTTP) pages of Wikipedia, which do not contain sensitive words, were unaffected.

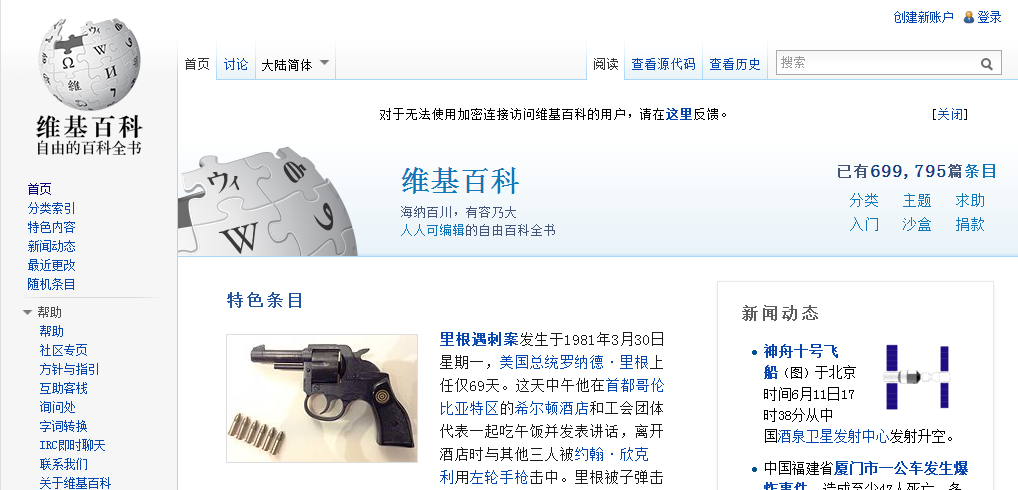
In June 2013, when the Chinese Wikipedia was blocked, a notice was added to the welcome message on its homepage. (June 12, 2013)

On December 19, 2013, due to the adjustment of the CNAME record of the domain name of Wikipedia in each language, users in mainland China could directly access the encrypted version (HTTPS) of Wikipedia in each language and the plaintext version (HTTP) pages without sensitive words.

=== 2015–2019: Blocking of Chinese Wikipedia ===
On the afternoon of May 19, 2015, Chinese Wikipedia became inaccessible in mainland China due to an HTTP connection reset and DNS contamination of zh.wikipedia.org. Users can get around this by modifying the local host's file or changing the DNS server and accessing the encrypted version of Wikipedia (HTTPS). Still, the Wikimedia Foundation cannot change the IP address of Wikipedia. The block did not affect Wikimedia's other projects (except Chinese Wikinews, which DNS contaminated) and foreign language Wikipedia. In mid-June that year, the Wikimedia Foundation implemented mandatory encryption (HTTPS) for its projects. Later in the same year, the Cantonese (desktop version only; mobile version was blocked at the same time as other language versions on April 23, 2019), Wu (same as Cantonese), and Uyghur versions of Wikipedia were soon blocked using the same means as the Chinese Wikipedia.

In December 2015, after Wikimedia switched to mandatory encryption throughout the site, rendering keyword filtering ineffective, all language versions of Wikipedia were briefly made inaccessible in mainland China via the blocking of its IP address. The block was lifted shortly after, and most items were again directly accessible.

On August 24, 2018, the Great Firewall adopted SNI detection to block Chinese, Japanese, and Uyghur Wikipedia domain names, which made it invalid to bypass the network blockade by modifying the host's file or changing the DNS.

=== After 2019: Wikipedia blocked in all languages ===
Since April 23, 2019, the entire Wikipedia site (*.wikipedia.org) has been completely blocked in mainland China, and its home page and all language versions cannot be accessed commonly. The blocking method is DNS pollution, among which the Chinese, Japanese, and Uyghur Wikipedia also have HTTP connection reset and SNI blocking. On the next day, the entire Wikipedia site was blocked by SNI blocking mode based on being contaminated by DNS the previous day. On May 14, the Wikimedia Foundation confirmed that the Chinese government had blocked all Wikipedia sites since April. On May 17, the Wikimedia Foundation issued a statement urging the Chinese government to unblock Wikipedia.

On May 8, 2019, other major Wikimedia projects (such as Wikimedia Commons, meta-wiki, Wiktionary, etc.) were temporarily inaccessible due to DNS contamination. Since June 10, 2019, the mobile version of Wiki Commons has been blocked, and the DNS parsing query found that the parsing result was abnormal. After verification, it was contaminated by DNS, and the desktop version of Wiki Commons had not been blocked for the time being (it was later blocked in December of the same year).

Since July 2019, the English version of Wikinews and the Chinese version of Wikiquote have been blocked. After verification, the English Wikinews were contaminated by DNS, while DNS tainted the Chinese Wikiquote and the SNI-based HTTPS connection reset. Since November 2019, the mobile version of the Chinese Wiki Academy has been blocked. The DNS parsing query found that the parsing result was abnormal. Since December 2019, the IPv4 address (198.35.26.96) of the San Francisco-based Wikimedia Foundation server has been blocked, which makes other parts of the Wikimedia Foundation's projects (such as Japanese Wikinews) inaccessible in mainland China.

During the two sessions in China in May 2020, the IPv4 addresses of the Wikimedia Foundation's servers in Singapore (103.102.166.224) and Ashburn (208.80.154.224) were officially blocked. IPv4 access to all Wikimedia Foundation projects in mainland China is almost completely blocked. In addition, the IPv4 addresses of the Wikimedia Foundation's media server upload.wikimedia.org in San Francisco and Ashburn (198.35.26.112 and 208.80.154.240) were stopped for an unspecified period. As a result, the Wikimedia Foundation's media servers are not directly accessible in mainland China.

On October 24, 2020, a man was issued a warning and ordered to stop accessing the global internet by police in Zhoushan City in East China's Zhejiang province. Authorities said he used the wall-turning software Lantern (Chinese: 蓝灯) to search for information on Wikipedia and was visited by police to "check the water meter." This is the first case in mainland China where someone has been explicitly punished for browsing Wikipedia. The official website of the Zhejiang Provincial Party Committee announced that from the first half of 2019 to October 2020, the man repeatedly used the software to "illegally access Wikipedia to obtain information". The official announcement also listed the man's name and address of his apartment complex.

== Reactions ==
In July 2004, Jimmy Wales, the founder of the Wikipedia Project, said in an interview:

To block Wikipedia would be a great irony to the censors because we are not subject to any of the censorship they claim; Censoring Wikipedia is an admission that it is precisely neutral factual information that frightens it. We are not a propaganda machine; we are not online gambling; we are not pornography. We are an encyclopedia.

After Wikimedia was blocked for the third time in October 2005, Wales summarized the arguments he made in his speech at the World Summit on the Information Society in Tunis:

1. Wikipedia is neither critical nor supportive of the Chinese government. We are not a website for dissidents nor for government supporters. We are neutral. NPOV is non-negotiable. It is impossible to portray Wikipedia as anti-Chinese government unless the Chinese government wants to argue that neutral information is anti-Chinese government, and I don't think that's what they intend to say at all.

2. It isn't *just* that Chinese people cannot read any of Wikipedia, most of which is not about political or sensitive topics at all. It is that Chinese people are unable to *express* their views and culture in the Chinese Wikipedia or English Wikipedia or anywhere else, so long as Wikipedia is blocked. Since, I am told, the Chinese wikipedians tend to have more of a "mainland" view of things, as compared to Chinese living in Taiwan or Hong Kong, the ironic effect of the Chinese censorship is to censor the mainland perspective on world affairs.

It is fine to criticize the Chinese government for censorship of criticism. But my argument was not about that at all, since we are not critics of the Chinese government. My argument was that censoring Wikipedia in China is ironically censoring *the rest of the world* from hearing the voice of the Chinese people.

On December 2, 2015, Wales announced at the Leadership Energy Summit Asia 2015 conference in Kuala Lumpur that he would fly to Beijing in two weeks to lobby the Chinese government to unblock the Chinese Wikipedia. Later, at the second World Internet Conference held by the Cyberspace Administration of China in Wuzhen, he said:

I believe as a result of this, the idea that any one government can control the flow of information of what people know in their territory will become completely antiquated and no longer possible.

However, the interpreter at the meeting translated his words as "also, the government can do a good analysis of the communication between people in their respective fields."

On July 19, 2018, Wales attended the Asia-Pacific Economic Cooperation Digital Innovation Forum (APEC DIF) in Taiwan and introduced his new website, Wikitribune. Jimmy Wales said in an interview with the media that he would continue communicating with the Chinese government to lift the block on Wikipedia in mainland China as soon as possible. Wales reiterated that he would not give up long-held principles to enter the Chinese market and cited the example of a Taiwanese Wikipedia volunteer's exchange with Chinese users.
