= Chinese Wikipedia =

Written vernacular Chinese-language edition of Wikipedia

- Website logos in Traditional Chinese (left) and simplified Chinese (right)

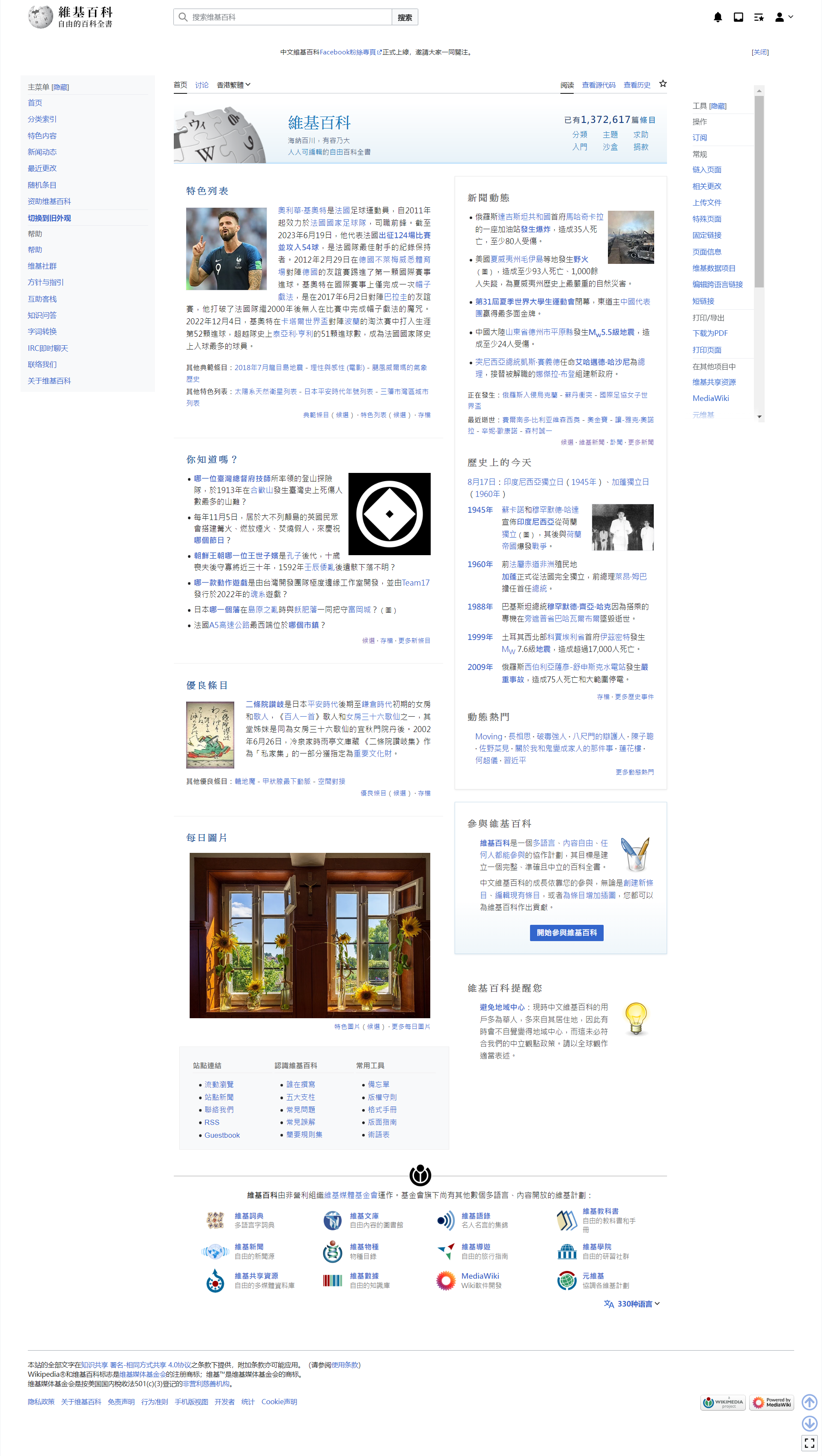
- Screenshot Main page of the Chinese Wikipedia
- Native name: 維基百科 / 维基百科
- Website type: Online encyclopedia
- Available in: Written vernacular Chinese, both traditional and simplified writing systems are available. Articles can be written in both of these systems, and displayed results are always in one of these, as it has a built-in character converter.
- Owner: Wikimedia Foundation
- Website: zh.wikipedia.org
- Commercial: No
- Registration: Optional
- Users: 4.26 million (as of 10 November 2026)
- Launched: 11 May 2001; 25 years ago
- Current status: Active but banned in mainland China
- Content license: Creative Commons Attribution/ Share-Alike 4.0 (most text also dual-licensed under GFDL); Media licensing varies

Chinese name
- Traditional Chinese: 中文維基百科
- Simplified Chinese: 中文维基百科
- Literal meaning: Chinese-language Wiki-encyclopedia
Transcriptions
Standard Mandarin
- Hanyu Pinyin: Zhōngwén Wéijī Bǎikē
- Bopomofo: ㄓㄨㄥ ㄨㄣˊ ㄨㄟˊ ㄐㄧ ㄅㄞˇ ㄎㄜ
- Gwoyeu Romatzyh: Jongwen Weiji Baeke
- Wade–Giles: Chung^{1}-wen^{2} Wei^{2}-chi^{1} Pai^{3}-k'o^{1}
- Tongyong Pinyin: Jhong-wún Wéi-ji Bǎi-ke
- IPA: [ʈʂʊ́ŋwə̌n wěɪtɕí pàɪkʰɤ́]
Hakka
- Romanization: Chûng-vùn Vì-kî Pak-khô
Yue: Cantonese
- Yale Romanization: Jūngmàhn Wàihgēi Baakfō
- Jyutping: Zung1man4 Wai4gei1 Baak3fo1
- Canton Romanization: Zung¹men⁴ Wei⁴géi¹ Bag³fo¹
- IPA: [tsɔŋ˥.mɐn˩ wɐj˩.kej˥ pak̚˧.fɔ˥]

The Chinese Wikipedia (traditional Chinese: 中文維基百科; simplified Chinese: 中文维基百科; pinyin: Zhōngwén Wéijī Bǎikē) is the written vernacular Chinese edition of Wikipedia. It was created on 11 May 2001. It is one of multiple projects supported by the Wikimedia Foundation.

The Chinese Wikipedia has been blocked in mainland China since May 2015. Nonetheless, the Chinese Wikipedia is still one of the top ten most active versions of Wikipedia by number of edits and number of editors, due to contributions from users from Taiwan, Hong Kong, Macau, Singapore, Malaysia, and the Chinese diaspora. Readers from Taiwan and Hong Kong contribute most of the page views of the Chinese Wikipedia.

Despite being censored in mainland China, and as VPNs are normally not allowed to edit Wikipedia, Wikipedia administrators from China have permitted IP block exemption for a select number of mainland users. Such users are recruited to change the editorial content on Wikipedia in support of China's viewpoint and/or to support the election of pro-Chinese government administrators on Wikipedia, with the aim of gaining control of Wikipedia as part of the Chinese Communist Party's coordinated efforts to push their preferred narrative on platforms that have respected worldwide credibility. There has also been an exodus of volunteer editors leaving Baidu Baike, a domestic competitor beset by problems of self-censorship and commercialization, to join Chinese Wikipedia because the "contributors wanted the privilege of working on a higher-quality internet encyclopedia" that also "carries a great deal of international power". Observers have suggested that such moves are not just due to patriotic mainlanders but a "larger structural coordinated strategy the government has to manipulate these platforms" beside Wikipedia, such as Twitter and Facebook.

The resulting pro-Beijing Wikipedia community, the Wikimedians of Mainland China (WMC), has clashed with Wikipedia editors from Taiwan and Hong Kong, not only over content disputes on Wikipedia articles, but also made death threats against their Wikimedian communities. In particular, the WMC has threatened to report Wikipedia editors to Hong Kong's national security police hotline over the disputed article "2019–2020 Hong Kong protests" characterized by edit warring. The Foundation's investigation also found that "infiltrators had tried to promote "the aims of China, as interpreted through whatever filters they may bring to bear" and that the WMC had been involved in vote-stacking and manipulation of administrative elections.

Due to such threats to volunteer safety, as well as the manipulation of administrative elections by Mainland editors, Wikimedia revoked access of seven editors and downgraded the privileges of 12 Mainland-based administrators on 16 September 2021 over "infiltration concerns." The affair caused significant controversy on Chinese Wikipedia, and also drew critical commentary from Chinese media, where Wikipedia is rarely discussed.

== Statistics ==
Chinese Wikipedia has 1,565,438 articles (the twelfth-largest Wikipedia), 4,264,623 registered users, and 13,286 active editors, of whom 60 have administrative privileges. In 2016 Chinese Wikipedia had 4.9 billion page views, and in 2026, Chinese Wikipedia ranked eighth in all-time page views.

== History ==
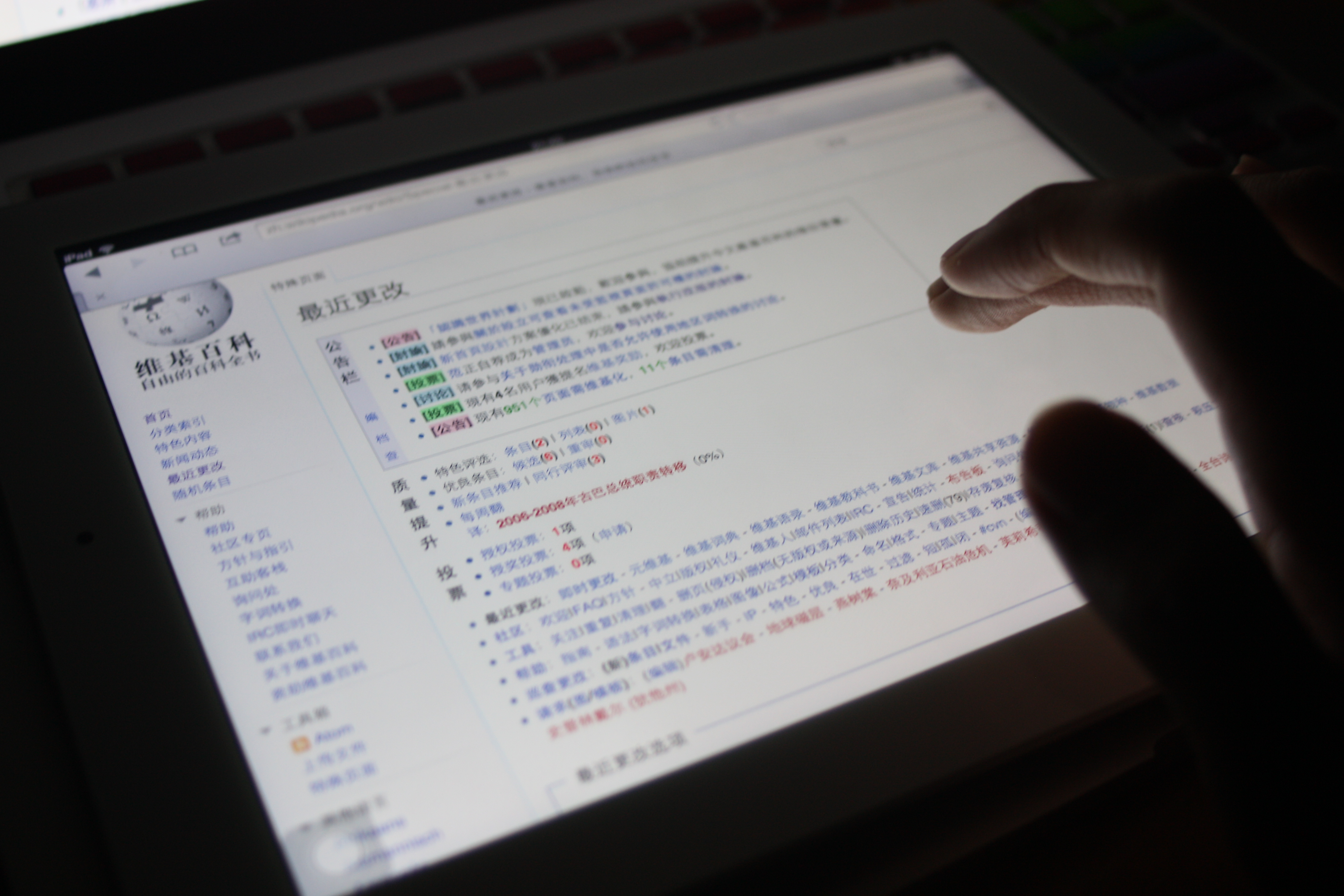
Browsing the Chinese Wikipedia on an iPad

The first article was created on 1 November 2002 by user Ghyll.

In order to accommodate the orthographic differences between simplified Chinese characters and traditional Chinese characters (or orthodox Chinese), from 2002 to 2003, the Chinese Wikipedia community gradually decided to combine the two originally separate versions of the Chinese Wikipedia. The first running automatic conversion between the two orthographic representations started on 23 December 2004, with the MediaWiki 1.4 release. The needs from Hong Kong and Singapore were taken into account in the MediaWiki 1.4.2 release, which made the conversion table for zh-sg default to zh-cn, and zh-hk default to zh-tw.

In its early days, most articles on the Chinese Wikipedia were translated from the English version. The first five sysops, or administrators, were promoted on 14 June 2003.

Wikipedia was first introduced by the mainland Chinese media in the newspaper China Computer Education on 20 October 2003, in the article, "I'll write an encyclopedia too" (我也来写百科全书).

On 16 May 2004, Wikipedia was first reported by Taiwanese media in the newspaper China Times. Since then, many newspapers have published articles about the Chinese Wikipedia, and several sysops have been interviewed by journalists.

Ivan Zhai of the South China Morning Post wrote that the blocks from the mainland authorities in the 2000s stifled the growth of the Chinese Wikipedia, and that by 2013 there was a new generation of users originating from the Mainland who were taking efforts to make the Chinese Wikipedia grow. In 2024, there were 3.6 million registered users on the Chinese Wikipedia, and in July 2013 7,500 of these users were active, with most of them originating from Hong Kong and Taiwan.

== Naming ==
Opening the Chinese Wikipedia main page with Mozilla Firefox on Ubuntu 20.04

The Chinese name of Wikipedia was decided on 21 October 2003, following a vote.

The name (Chinese: 維基百科; pinyin: Wéijī Bǎikē) means "Wiki Encyclopedia". The Chinese transcription of "Wiki" is composed of two characters: 維, whose ancient sense refers to 'ropes or webs connecting objects', and alludes to the 'Internet'; and 基, meaning the 'foundations of a building', or 'fundamental aspects of things in general'. The name can be interpreted as 'the encyclopedia that connects the fundamental knowledge of humanity'.

The most common Chinese translation for wiki technology is 維基; however, it can be 維客 (literally "dimension visitor" or similar) or 圍紀 (literally "circle/enclose period/record" or similar), which are also transcriptions of the word "wiki". As a result, the term 維基 has become associated exclusively with Wikimedia projects.

The Chinese Wikipedia has a subtitle: "海納百川，有容乃大", which means, "The ocean is vast because it admits all rivers." This was written by Qing official Lin Zexu, and the full sentence is "海納百川，有容乃大；壁立千仞，無欲則剛".

== Community ==
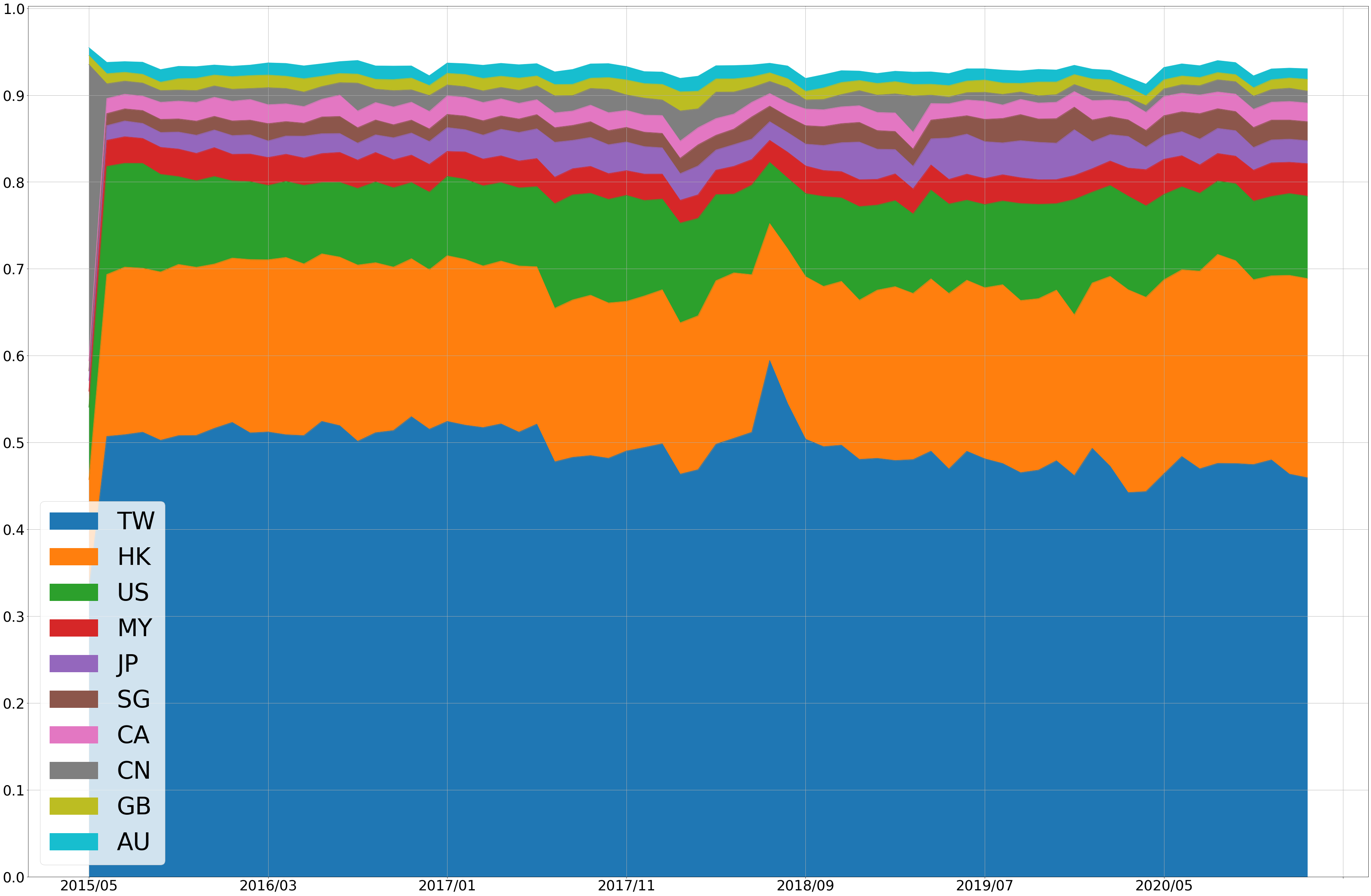
Origin of viewers by country over time on the Chinese Wikipedia

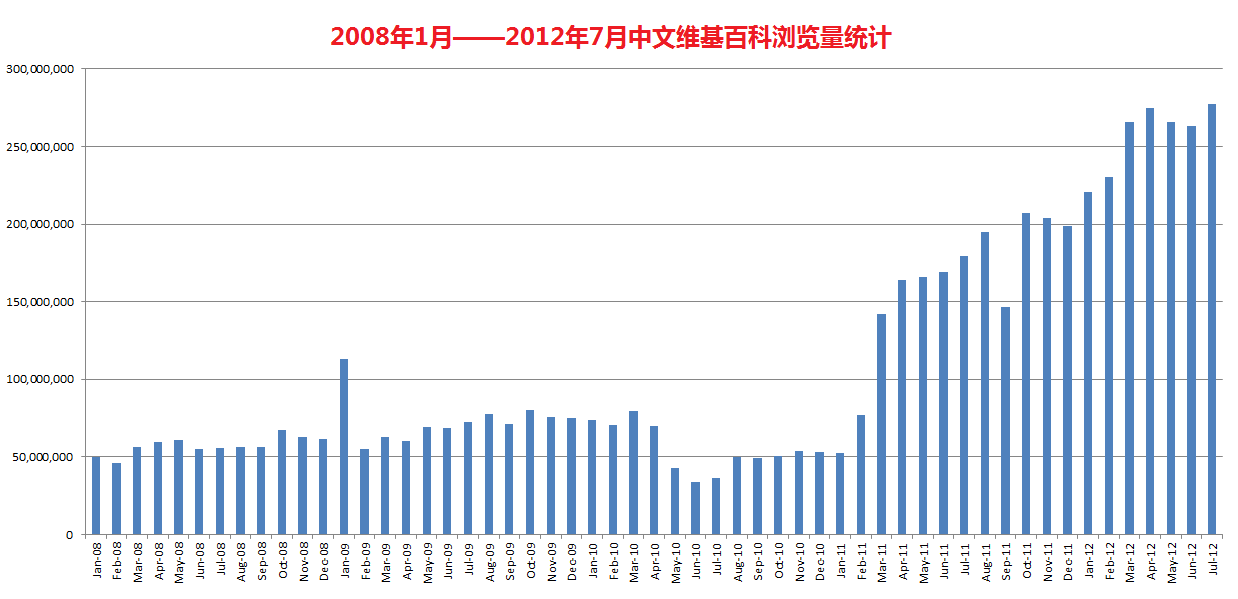
Page view statistics as of July 2012

According to Wikimedia Statistics, in January 2021, the majority of viewers and editors on the Chinese Wikipedia were from Taiwan and Hong Kong.

Wikipedians from China, Taiwan, and other regions have engaged in editing conflicts over political topics related to Cross-Straits relations. Due to the censorship in mainland China, Chinese Wikipedia's audience comes primarily from Taiwan, Hong Kong, Macau, Singapore and the diasporas in Malaysia, the United States, Canada, Australia, and South Korea (including Koreans from China), totaling approximately 60 million people. Chinese Wikipedia has more than 9,100 active editors as of July 2021, and this number is increasing.

=== Administrators ===
There are 63 administrators on Chinese Wikipedia in 2026.

=== Meetings ===
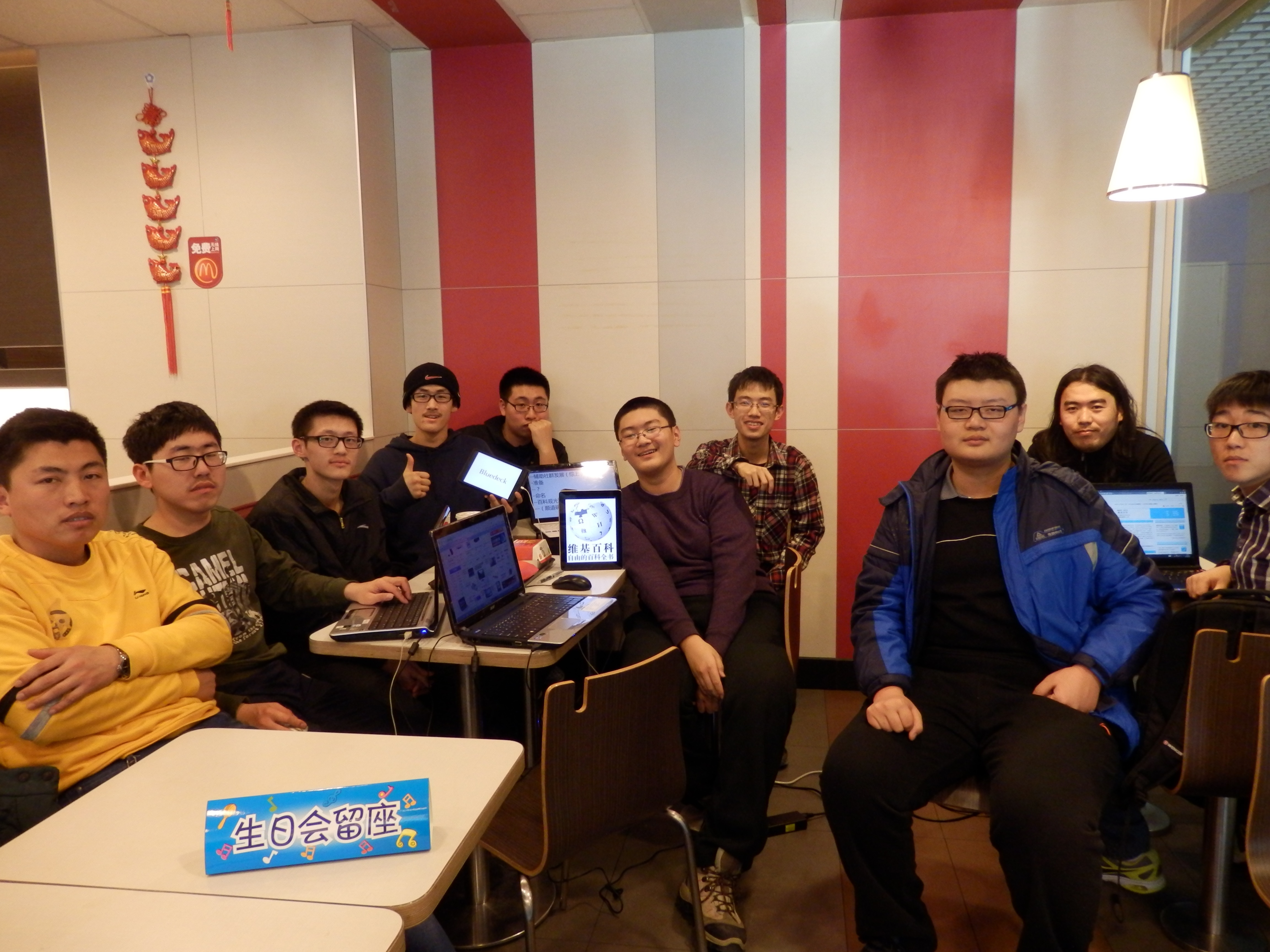
2013 Winter-Break-Meetup in Dalian, Liaoning, China

The first Chinese Wikipedian meeting was held in Beijing on 25 July 2004. Since then, Chinese Wikipedians from different regions have held many gatherings in Beijing, Shanghai, Dalian, Shenyang, Guangdong, Hong Kong, and Taiwan. Currently, a regular meetup is held once every two weeks in Shanghai, Taipei and Hong Kong, and once every month in Tainan City, Taiwan. In July 2006, Taiwanese Wikipedians also held a "travelling meetup", travelling by train through four Taiwanese cities over a period of two days. In August 2006, Hong Kong hosted the first annual Chinese Wikimedia Conference.

=== State persecution of volunteers ===
Chinese Wikipedia volunteers who edit topics that state authorities consider controversial, such as the Hong Kong protests, can face harassment and persecution.

== Automatic conversion between traditional and simplified Chinese characters ==
=== Original situation ===
Originally, there were virtually two Chinese Wikipedias under the names of "zh" (or "zh-cn") and "zh-tw". Generally, users from regions that used traditional Chinese characters (such as Taiwan, Hong Kong, and Macau) wrote and edited articles using traditional Chinese characters whereas those from regions that used simplified Chinese characters (such as mainland China, Singapore, and Malaysia) wrote using simplified Chinese characters. Many articles had two uncoordinated versions; for example, there was both a traditional (法國) and simplified (法国) article on France. Further exacerbating the problem were differences in vocabulary (particularly nouns) and writing systems between mainland China, Taiwan, Hong Kong, and Singapore. For example, a pineapple is called 菠萝 in mainland China and 菠蘿 in Hong Kong and Macau, but 黄梨 in Singapore and Malaysia and 鳳梨 in Taiwan.

=== Solution ===
To avoid this near-forking of the project, starting around January 2005, the Chinese Wikipedia began providing a server-side mechanism to automatically convert different characters and vocabulary items into the user's local ones, according to the user's preference settings, which may be set to one of two settings that convert the script only, or one of six settings that also take into account regional vocabulary differences:

| Variant's name | Chinese name | ISO |
|---|---|---|
| Simplified | 简体 | zh-Hans |
| Traditional | 繁體 | zh-Hant |
| Simplified and using mainland Chinese terms | 大陆简体 | zh-CN |
| Traditional and using Taiwanese terms | 臺灣正體 | zh-TW |
| Simplified and using Singaporean (and until mid 2018, Malaysian) terms | 新加坡简体 (马新简体 until mid 2018) | zh-SG |
| Simplified and using Malaysian terms (added in mid 2018) | 大马简体 | zh-MY |
| Traditional and using Hong Kong (and until mid 2013, Macau) terms | 香港繁體 (港澳繁體 until mid 2013) | zh-HK |
| Traditional and using Macau terms (added in mid 2013) | 澳門繁體 | zh-MO |
No conversion (displaying the unnormalized article as originally written by contributors)
For more information, see: meta:automatic conversion between simplified and traditional Chinese.

Conversion is done through conversion tables. The main tables are edited by administrators. When these are insufficient, editors can write page-specific conversion rules or use markup for one-time conversion of a single phrase.

Furthermore, page title conversion is used for automatic page redirection. Those articles previously named in different characters or different translations have been merged, and can be reached by means of both traditional and simplified Chinese titles.

== Differences with other versions of Wikipedia ==
According to a survey conducted between April 2010 and March 2011, edits to the Chinese Wikipedia were 37.8% from Taiwan, 26.2% from Hong Kong, 17.7% from mainland China, 6.1% from United States, and 2.3% from Canada.

Many editing controversies arise from current and historical political events in Chinese-speaking regions, such as the political status of Taiwan, the independence movement and autonomy movement of Hong Kong, the Hong Kong anti-extradition bill protests, the 1989 Tiananmen Square protests and massacre, and issues of the Chinese Communist Party and Kuomintang.

== Wikipedia in other varieties of Chinese ==
The countries and territories in which the Chinese Wikipedia is the most popular language version of Wikipedia are shown in light green.

The Chinese Wikipedia is based on written vernacular Chinese, the official Chinese written language in all Chinese-speaking regions, including mainland China, Taiwan, Hong Kong, Macau, and Singapore. This register is largely associated with the grammar and vocabulary of Standard Chinese, the official spoken language of mainland China, Taiwan, and Singapore (but not exclusively of Hong Kong and Macau, which largely use Cantonese).

The varieties of Chinese are a diverse group encompassing many regional topolects, most of which are mutually unintelligible and often divided up into several larger dialect groups, such as Wu (including Shanghainese and Suzhounese), Min Nan (of which Taiwanese is a notable dialect), and Cantonese. In regions that speak non-Mandarin languages or regional Mandarin dialects, the Vernacular Chinese standard largely corresponding to Standard Chinese is nevertheless used exclusively as the Chinese written standard; this written standard differs sharply from the local dialects in vocabulary and grammar, and is often read in local pronunciation but preserving the vocabulary and grammar of Standard Chinese. After the founding of Wikipedia, many users of non-Mandarin Chinese varieties began to ask for the right to have Wikipedia editions in non-Mandarin varieties as well. However, they also met with significant opposition, based on the fact that Mandarin-based Vernacular Chinese is the only form used in scholarly or academic contexts. Some also proposed the implementation of an automatic conversion program similar to that between simplified and traditional Chinese; however, others pointed out that although conversion between simplified and traditional Chinese consists mainly of glyph and sometimes vocabulary substitutions, different regional varieties of Chinese differ so sharply in grammar, syntax, and semantics that it was unrealistic to implement an automatic conversion program.

Objections notwithstanding, it was determined that these Chinese varieties were sufficiently different from Standard Chinese and had a sufficiently large number of followers to justify the creation of six Wikipedias for different varieties.

| Edition name | WP code | Variety | Writing system |
|---|---|---|---|
| Cantonese Wikipedia | zh-yue: | Yue, using Cantonese (i.e. the Guangzhou/Hong Kong/Macau dialect) as its standard. | Traditional |
| Minnan Wikipedia | zh-min-nan: | Southern Min, using Taiwanese as its standard. | Latin (Pe̍h-ōe-jī) and traditional |
| Mindong Wikipedia | cdo: | Eastern Min, using Fuzhounese as its standard. | Latin (Bàng-uâ-cê) and traditional |
| Wu Wikipedia | wuu: | Wu, using the Shanghainese, Suzhounese and classical literary Wu as its standards. | Simplified |
| Hakka Wikipedia | hak: | Hakka, using the Siyen dialect as its standard. | Latin (Pha̍k-fa-sṳ) and traditional |
| Gan Wikipedia | gan: | Gan, using the Nanchang dialect as its standard. | Traditional and simplified |

Finally, requests were also made, and granted, to create a Classical Chinese Wikipedia (zh-classical:), based on Classical Chinese, an archaic register of Chinese with grammar and vocabulary drawn from classical works and used in all official contexts until the early 20th century, when it was displaced by the Vernacular Chinese standard.

All of the above Wikipedias have sidestepped the traditional/simplified Chinese issue. The Wu Wikipedia uses simplified Chinese exclusively, and the Classical Chinese Wikipedia uses traditional Chinese exclusively (the Gan and Cantonese Wikipedias default to traditional, but have a conversion function similar to the Chinese Wikipedia). The Min Nan Wikipedia uses Pe̍h-ōe-jī. The Mindong Wikipedia and Hakka Wikipedias currently use Bàng-uâ-cê and Pha̍k-fa-sṳ respectively, which can be converted to traditional Chinese characters, thus avoiding the issue completely.

=== Eastern Min ===
Eastern Min Wikipedia
- Website type: Internet encyclopedia project
- Available in: Fuzhou dialect
- Owner: Wikimedia Foundation
- Website: cdo.wikipedia.org
- Commercial: No
- Registration: Optional
- Launched: September 30, 2006; 20 years ago

The Eastern Min Wikipedia (Foochow Romanized: Bànguâpedia) is the Mindong Chinese edition of Wikipedia, run by the Wikimedia Foundation. The project was started on 30 September 2006. The writing system used in the Mindong Wikipedia is Foochow Romanized, a romanized orthography based on the standard Fuzhou dialect that was introduced by Western missionaries in the 19th century, and Chinese characters although most articles are in Foochow.

The Eastern Min Wikipedia was originally written using only Fuzhou romanization characters. On 23 June 2013, influenced by the establishment of a Chinese character version of the Hakka Wikipedia, the Eastern Min Wikipedia began to set up a Chinese character homepage, and since then, Chinese character version entries have gradually appeared. This project is also the second project in the Chinese Wikipedia to use both the Latin alphabet and the Chinese character writing system.

As of the end of November 2014, there were a total of 1,496 entries in the East Min Wikipedia, with one administrator and one active editor (one who registered and edited more than five times a month), and ranked 202nd among all Wikipedia languages in terms of number of entries.

=== Hakka ===
Hakka Wikipedia
- Website type: Internet encyclopedia project
- Available in: Hakka
- Headquarters: Miami, Florida
- Owner: Wikimedia Foundation
- Website: hak.wikipedia.org
- Commercial: No
- Registration: Optional
- Launched: 27 May 2007; 19 years ago

The Hakka Wikipedia (Pha̍k-fa-sṳ: Hak-kâ-ngî Wikipedia) is the Hakka language version of Wikipedia. As of September 2025, it contains 10,366 articles and has 35,210 registered users, including 30 active contributors and 1 administrator.

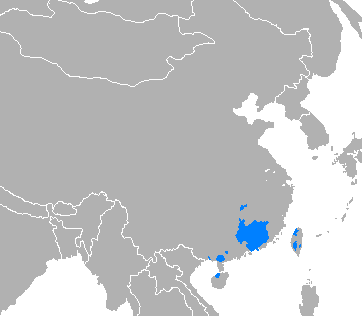
Areas where Hakka is spoken

The Hakka Wikipedia was originally written only in Pha̍k-fa-sṳ. For users who are not familiar with vernacular characters, a Hakka dictionary and a simple comparison table are provided on the homepage. The vernacular part is mainly based on the Sixian dialect of Taiwanese Hakka (i.e. the Roman pinyin of Taiwan Hakka). There are also many entries written in the vernacular of mainland Hakka, and even written in Hagfa Pinyim.

On 10 March 2015, the Hakka edition had 4,512 articles and 13,485 registered users, making it the 155th language edition of Wikipedia by number of articles and the 161st by number of registered users among the 287 active language editions at the time.

== Blocking of Wikipedia ==
The People's Republic of China and internet service providers in mainland China have adopted a practice of blocking contentious Internet sites in mainland China, and Wikimedia sites have been blocked at least three times in its history.

On 19 May 2015, Chinese Wikipedia was blocked again within mainland China. Because all Wikipedias rely on HTTPS links, Chinese censors cannot see what page an individual is viewing; this also makes it more difficult to block a specific set of pages.

=== First block ===
The first block lasted from 2 to 21 June 2004. It began when access to the Chinese Wikipedia from Beijing was blocked on the 15th anniversary of the 1989 Tiananmen Square protests and massacre.

Possibly related to this, on 31 May an article from the IDG News Service was published, discussing the Chinese Wikipedia's treatment of the protests. The Chinese Wikipedia also has articles related to Taiwan independence, written by contributors from Taiwan and elsewhere. A few days after the initial block of the Chinese Wikipedia, all Wikimedia Foundation sites were blocked in mainland China. In response to the blocks, two moderators prepared an appeal to lift the block and asked their regional internet service provider to submit it. All Wikimedia sites were unblocked between 17 and 21 June 2004. One month later, the first Chinese Wikipedian moderators' meeting was held in Beijing on 25 July 2004.

The first block had an effect on the vitality of the Chinese Wikipedia, which suffered sharp dips in various indicators, such as the number of new users, the number of new articles, and the number of edits. In some cases, it took anywhere from 6 to 12 months in order to regain the stats from May 2004. On the other hand, on today's site, some of the articles are put under protection which may last for a month or more without any actions.

=== Second block ===
The second and less serious outage lasted between 23 and 27 September 2004. During this four-day period, access to Wikipedia was erratic or unavailable to some users in mainland China – this block was not comprehensive and some users in mainland China were never affected. The exact reason for the block is a mystery. Chinese Wikipedians once again prepared a written appeal to regional ISPs, but the block was lifted before the appeal was actually sent, for an unknown reason.

=== Third block and temporary unblocks ===
The third block began on 19 October 2005, and there was no indication as to whether this block was temporary or permanent, or what the reasons or causes for this block were. According to the status page currently maintained on the Chinese Wikipedia, the Florida and Korea servers were blocked, whereas the Paris and Amsterdam servers were not. Dozens of editors from across mainland China reported that they could only access Wikipedia using proxy servers, although there were isolated reports that some users could access Wikipedia without using a proxy. Most Chinese people were not able to connect to the site at all.

During October and November 2006, it first appeared that the site was unblocked again. Many conflicting reports came from news outlets, bloggers, and Wikipedians, reporting a possible partial or full unblocking of Wikipedia. Some reports indicated a complete unblock; others suggested that some sensitive topics remained blocked, and yet others suggested that the Chinese Wikipedia was blocked whereas other-language versions were not. From 17 November onwards, the complete block was once again in place.

On 15 June 2007, China lifted the block for several articles, only to then block an increasing number of articles. On 30 August 2007, all blocks were lifted, but then a block was placed on Wikipedia for all languages on 31 August 2007. As of 26 January 2008, all languages of Wikipedia were blocked, and as of 2 April 2008, the block was lifted.

By 5 April 2008, the Chinese Wikipedia became difficult to access from the Sun Yat-Sen University in Guangzhou. Connections to the Chinese Wikipedia were completely blocked as of 6 April 2008. Any attempt to access the Chinese Wikipedia resulted in a 60-second ban on all Wikimedia websites. However, users were able to log on to the Chinese Wikipedia using https. All other languages were accessible, but politically sensitive searches such as Tibet were still blocked.

On 3 July 2008, the government lifted the ban on accessing the Chinese Wikipedia. However, some parts were still inaccessible. On 31 July 2008, the BBC reported that the Chinese Wikipedia had been unblocked that day in China; it had still been blocked the previous day. This came within the context of foreign journalists arriving in Beijing to report on the upcoming Olympic Games, and websites like the Chinese edition of the BBC were being unblocked following talks between the International Olympic Committee and the Games' Chinese organizers.

=== Fourth block ===
On 19 May 2015, both the encrypted and unencrypted Chinese-language versions of Wikipedia were blocked.

=== Fifth block ===
On 23 April 2019, all versions of Wikipedia were blocked in China.

== Controversy and criticism ==
=== 2010 administrator controversy ===
In April 2010, Hong Kong newspaper Ming Pao reported the large-scale censorship of contents about the 1989 Tiananmen Square protests and massacre and Hong Kong related contents in which an administrator named "Shizhao" ("百無一用是書生" a.k.a. "時昭") was involved. The report also mentioned the failed recall of the administrator.

In a follow-up, Ming Pao interviewed Shizhao, who stated that he was not a member of the 50 Cent Party. He added that for controversial topics such as the 1989 protests, he should be a little more cautious. Shizhao denied that he had attempted to delete an article about the Concert For Democracy in China, and stated that he merely questioned the notability of the concert by adding a template to the article. However, he had started a vote to delete an article about a song criticizing the Hong Kong government (Chinese: 福佳始終有你; pinyin: Fú jiā shǐzhōng yǒu nǐ) in 2007, enraging many Hong Kong netizens. Shizhao added that, at the time, he had already edited more than 50,000 times, deleting several articles including Manual for Librarians. He joked about the incident, saying, "some may consider that is a kind of hate to libraries and hence is not suitable for monitoring Wikipedia."

=== Allegations of bias against the Chinese government ===
Some Chinese officials and scholars have accused Chinese Wikipedia of having serious anti-Chinese government bias. Chinese academics Li-hao Gan and Bin-Ting Weng published a paper titled "Opportunities And Challenges Of China's Foreign Communication in the Wikipedia", in which they argue that "due to the influence by foreign media, Wikipedia entries have a large number of prejudiced words against the Chinese government". Jie Ding, an official from the China International Publishing Group, also published an article stating that "there is a lack of systematic ordering and maintenance of contents about China's major political discourse on Wikipedia". He also urged Wikipedia to reflect the voices and views of the Chinese government in an objective way. Lokman Tsui, an assistant professor at the School of Journalism and Communication at the Chinese University of Hong Kong, said in an interview with the BBC that "there a lot of misunderstandings about China abroad".

In October 2021, the Wikimedia Foundation's application to become an observer at the World Intellectual Property Organization (WIPO) was blocked by the government of China over the existence of a Wikimedia Foundation affiliate in Taiwan and accusation of "Anti-China false information".

Enming Yan, a former administrator of the Chinese Wikipedia, said in an interview with the BBC that "You're removing pro-Beijing voices and so the balance is going to tilt towards anti-Beijing forces within Wikipedia." However, Wikipedia's founder, Jimmy Wales, notes that the principles of freedom of expression and neutrality apply globally to Wikipedia. Wales said "I have deep experience of talking to people all over the world, and the idea that people in China, for example, are so brainwashed that they can't see that neutrality is just false."

=== Bad writing ===
A report by the Hong Kong University of Science and Technology found that:

Most Chinese articles suffer from content incoherence and lack of details compared to their English counterparts. Some of these articles are human-authored translation of the English version with varying degrees of accuracy and completeness, and others are illarranged combinations of excerpts directly adapted from external sources. The former takes considerable human effort and the latter tends to produce fragmented and incomplete texts. The intuitive solution of machine translation is also not feasible because it hardly provides satisfactory readability.

— Chen Yuncong & Pascale Fung

== State-sponsored editors/administrators ==
Despite being censored in mainland China, and as VPNs are normally not allowed to edit Wikipedia, Wikipedia administrators from China have permitted IP block exemption for a select number of mainland users. Such users are recruited to change the editorial content on Wikipedia in support of China's viewpoint and/or to support the election of pro-Chinese government administrators on Wikipedia, with the aim of gaining control of Wikipedia.

Academics suggested that "China urgently needs to encourage and train Chinese netizens to become Wikipedia platform opinion leaders and administrators ... [who] can adhere to socialist values and form some core editorial teams." This is seen as part of the Chinese Communist Party's coordinated efforts to push their preferred narrative on platforms that have respected worldwide credibility, as Wikipedia's domestic equivalent in China, Baidu Baike, lacks credibility due to self-censorship and commercialization. The resulting pro-Beijing Wikipedia community, known as the Wikimedians of Mainland China (WMC), was never formally recognized by the Wikimedia Foundation, as they had not signed legal documents provided by the foundation agreeing to protect the anonymity of its members.

=== Clashes with Taiwan and Hong Kong editors ===
Editors from Wikimedians of Mainland China have clashed with Wikipedia editors from Taiwan, not only over Wikipedia's content, but also making death threats made against Taiwan's community of Wikipedians. One Taiwanese editor suggested that it was not just patriotic mainlanders, but a "larger structural coordinated strategy the government has to manipulate these platforms" beside Wikipedia, such as Twitter and Facebook.

The Wikimedians of Mainland China has threatened to report Wikipedia editors to Hong Kong’s national security police hotline over the disputed article "2019–2020 Hong Kong protests" characterized by edit warring. A Hong Kong-based editor, who remains anonymous because of fears of intimidation, noted that "Pro-Beijing people often remove content that is sympathetic to protests, such as tear gas being fired and images of barricades. They also add their own content". Acknowledging that "edit wars" happen on both sides, the anonymous editor stated that "Pro-democracy editors tend to add content to shift the balance or the tone of the article, but in my experience, the pro-Beijing editors are a lot more aggressive in churning out disinformation. It's now unfixable without external interference. Someone is trying to rewrite history."

=== Bans on state-sponsored admins/editors ===
At 16:13 GMT, 13 September 2021 (00:13, 14 September 2021 Beijing Time), the Wikimedia Foundation globally banned seven Wikipedia users and removed administrator privileges from twelve users that were part of Wikimedians of Mainland China. Maggie Dennis, the foundation’s vice present of community resilience and sustainability, said that there had been a yearlong investigation into "infiltration concerns" that threatened the "very foundations of Wikipedia". Dennis observed that the infiltrators had tried to promote "the aims of China, as interpreted through whatever filters they may bring to bear". The investigation had also found that an unrecognized group of Mainland China editors, with approximately three hundred members, had been involved in vote-stacking and manipulation of administrative elections. Suggesting possible links to the Chinese Communist Party, Dennis said "We needed to act based on credible information that some members (not all) of that group [WMC] have harassed, intimidated, and threatened other members of our community, including in some cases physically harming others, in order to secure their own power and subvert the collaborative nature of our projects".

After the Wikimedia Foundation took action against the WMC editors, the Taiwanese Wikipedia community noted that such an action was long overdue and released a statement saying “We need to rebuild an inclusive wiki that welcomes everyone from all places who wants to contribute to Chinese language Wikipedia in good faith...Many people have felt unsafe for years, so restoring a shared sense of comfort is likely to take some time”.

== Competitors ==
On 20 April 2006, the online Chinese search engine company Baidu created Baidu Baike, an online encyclopedia that registered users can edit, pending administrator reviews. The content of the encyclopedia is self-censored in accordance with the regulations of the People's Republic of China government.

Baidu Baike and Hudong are both commercial products. Whereas the Chinese Wikipedia is released under the GNU Free Documentation License, Baidu Baike and Hudong are fully copyrighted by their ownership; contributors forfeit all rights upon submission. Within weeks, the number of articles in Baidu Baike had surpassed that of the Chinese Wikipedia. As of October 2009, Hudong Wiki surpassed Baidu Baike as China's largest online encyclopedia in terms of number of articles it owns. Baidu Baike's growth is mainly due to "widespread copyright infringement" by mass-copying Wikipedia pages and incorporating them into Baidu Baike pages since 2007.

Due to self-censorship and commercialization, Baidu Baike lacks credibility. Baidu Baike has been criticized as it "hawks opportunities for 'content collaboration' with celebrities" and monetarization. Baidu's "commercialization of misinformation" led to the death of student Wei Zexi in 2016, as Baidu search rankings promoted an experimental treatment recommended by a Baidu health care page in return for receiving payments, even though chemotherapy and surgery were more effective treatments for the disease. Most observers also found that Baidu Baike "publishes a lot of garbage...as Baidu Baike does not limit entries to notable topics or require that its information be supported by reliable sources". In recent years there has been an exodus of volunteer editors leaving Baidu Baike to join Chinese Wikipedia because the "contributors wanted the privilege of working on a higher-quality internet encyclopedia" that also "carries a great deal of international power".

== See also ==
- Censorship of Wikipedia § China
- Internet censorship in the People's Republic of China
- Politics of the People's Republic of China
- Golden Shield Project
- Chinese encyclopedias
- List of Wikipedias
- The Signpost, 26 September 2021
- Zhemao hoaxes
