= Mobile phone industry in China =

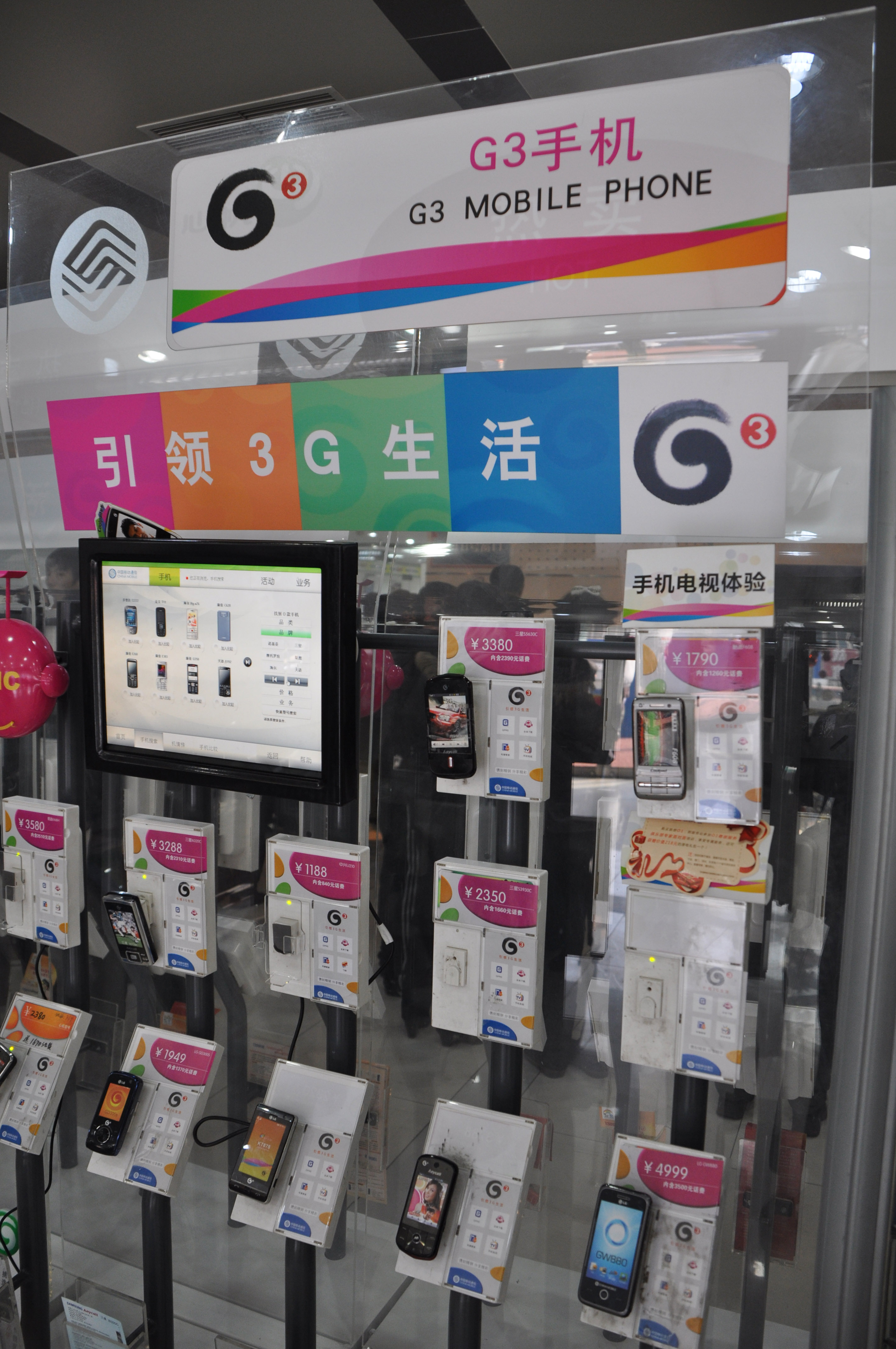
3G TD-SCDMA mobile phones on display at a China Mobile's branch (Photo taken in February, 2010, in Dalian, China

Meizu MX sold in China

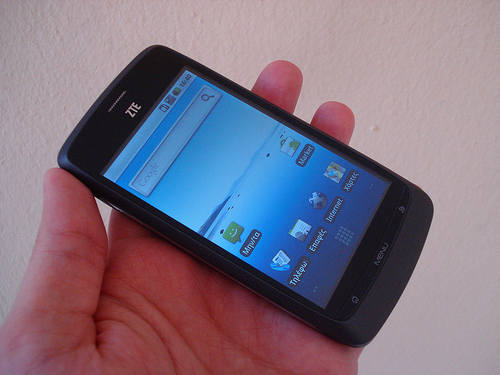
ZTE Blade and various models are popular in China.

China's mobile phone industry or cell phone industry has high growth rate, raising its share on the global mobile phone market. During 2007, 600 million mobile phones were made in China which accounted for over 25 percent of the global production. China is the largest market in terms of mobile phone subscribers.

== History ==
- In 1987, wireless telephone communication in the modern sense started by the Ministry of Posts and Telecommunications of China, using TACS technology. A nationwide network was completed in the following year.
- In 1994, the fixed telephone company (China Telecom) and two mobile phone telephone companies (China Mobile and China Unicom) were spun off from the Ministry of Posts and Telecommunications.
- In 2002, the fixed telephone company was split into two: China Netcom for North China and China Telecom for South China
- Until 2008, China's mobile phone service was provided by the three companies:
  - GSM service from China Mobile
  - GSM and CDMA service (begun in 2002) from China Unicom.
  - PHS service from the two fixed phone companies: China Netcom and China Telecom
- In 2008, another reorganization of the telecommunications industry was made a year before the 3G service was granted.
- In 2015, China recorded 1.3 billion mobile subscribers in its domestic market. Nearly everyone in the country has a mobile phone. Nearly 29.6 percent of mobile consumers or 386 million users are on the LTE 4G network.

== Mobile phone service providers ==
After the 2008 reorganization of China's telecommunication industry, there are now four mobile phone service providers.

=== China Mobile ===
China Mobile (Chinese: 中国移动) continues the old China Mobile's service, absorbed China Railway Communications, and began 3G service using TD-SCDMA, China's disputed own technology.

=== China Unicom ===
China Unicom (Chinese: 中国联通) continues the old China Unicom's GSM service, absorbed the old China Netcom's network of fixed telephones in the north of the Yangtze River in China, and started 3G service using W-CDMA technology.

=== China Telecom ===
China Telecom (Chinese: 中国电信) continues PHS service of the old China Netcom and China Telecom, continues the old China Telecom's network of fixed telephones in the south of the Yangtze River, and began 3G service using CDMA2000 technology.

=== China Broadnet ===
China Broadnet (Chinese: 中国广电) On March 3, 2022, China Broadcasting Network Corp Ltd invested 20 billion yuan to establish China Broadnet. It will subsequently launch its 5G network services and issue mobile phone numbers in the 192 segment to the public, marking the official announcement of China Broadnet as the fourth largest telecommunications operator in China. Now China Broadnet is providing 5G and LTE network by China Mobile's base station.

== Mobile Phone Industry ==
Wireless communication is regulated by the Ministry of Industry and Information Technology. The mobile phone industry in China has grown to become a large industry, including research of new technology, manufacturing of mobile phones and building of communications networks, contributed by the domestic companies and also foreign companies, such as:

- Datang Telecom (Research and development of China's 3G TD-SCDMA technology)
- Huawei Technologies
- ZTE
- Alcatel-Lucent
- Ericsson
- Nokia-Siemens Networks

Huawei Technologies is expected to surpass Nokia-Siemens Networks and Alcatel-Lucent to become the second largest manufacturer of telecommunications equipment, after Ericsson, in 2009.

ZTE and China Mobile have done turnkey mobile phone network projects in Pakistan, Ethiopia, etc.

== Mobile Phones ==
=== Major mobile phone manufacturers ===
==== Mainland China-based companies ====
- Haier
- Hisense
- Huawei
- LeTV
- Lenovo (Vibe lineup)
- Meizu
- Oppo
- OnePlus
- Realme
- TCL (including Palm)
- Vivo
- ZTE
- Infinix Mobile
- Tecno
- Itel
- Xiaomi
- POCO
- Black Shark
- Iqoo
- Coolpad
- Hotway
- Honor

==== International companies ====
- Asus
- HTC
- Motorola Mobility (subsidiary of Lenovo)
- Foxconn
- Samsung
- LG
- Apple
- Google

=== Domestics sales ===
The domestic sales of mobile phone made a breakthrough of 100 million in China in 2006.

In 2007, the domestic sales of mobile phone in china were 190 million, increased by 74 percent as compared with 2007. The impetus mainly came from the rapid growth of new mobile phone users and old customers' upgrading demands. Of 190 million mobile phones, 140 million were made through formal channels, while the rest were made through informal channels such as smuggling, counterfeiting and renovating.

=== Export volume ===
The export volume of China's mobile phones added up to a record high of 385 million in 2006, increased by 69.3 percent as compared with 2005. In 2007, this figure reached 483 million, increased by 125.45 percent as compared with 2006. As far as 2006, the export volume had reached US$31.214 billion, increased by 52.47 percent as compared with 2005. The export volume of 2007 was 35.6 billion dollars, increased by 114.01 percent as compared with 2006.

=== Development trend ===
Since 2011 smartphones, especially running the open source Android operating system, have become increasingly popular in the Chinese mobile market. By 2016 smart-phones have become the dominant seller in the Chinese market. This is due to the Android system providing the possibility for factories to produce smartphones with increasing ease, which in turn has allowed prices to decrease even to below RMB 1,000 Yuan. These cheap smartphones are also exported to every corner of the world thanks to Chinese internet sales platforms such as aliexpresss.com and DHGate.com, and overseas online sales platforms such as eBay.com and Amazon.com.

=== Pricing ===
China's mobile phone market is dominated by products with price under 2000 RMB yuan (about 300 dollars). Products at this price have accounted for 60 percent of the whole mobile phone market, competing with China's local brands, informal mobile phones and international brands.

== Features of China's mobile phones ==
- Most mobile phone services are prepaid. Pre-payment can be made by buying a card (50 or 100 yuan) and calling the mobile phone provider, or through commercial banks. Users can top-up the account via WeChat, top-up voucher, Alipay, or credit card online everywhere.
- There is a clear distinction of mobile phone and mobile phone service in China, unlike some countries such as Japan where the mobile phone is sold by and locked to the mobile phone service companies. This tradition was broken by the 2009 introduction of the iPhone.
- Stealing of mobile phones and therefore SIM cards is quite common. When a mobile phone is stolen, the owner must visit the mobile phone service provider to cancel the previous card, in order to retain the previous phone number and pre-payment.
- A short message (SMS) or duanxin (Chinese: 短信), usually 0.10 yuan per message (up to 160 alphabetic or 70 Chinese characters), can be sent to any other cell phones across different cell phone service companies, GSM, CDMA or PHS.
- Multimedia Messaging Service (MMS) or caixin (Chinese: 彩信) is also available, usually 0.3 yuan per message (up to 50 kilobytes).
- A custom ringback tone ("calling", Chinese: 彩铃), usually 5 yuan per month, is an additional service. It is when the called party can send a ringback tone to the calling party music (or any kind of sound) that the called party likes.

== Privacy ==
Android phones sold in China come with many more pre-installed apps that transmit privacy-sensitive data to third-parties without notice or consent.

== See also ==
- Communications in China
- Telecommunications industry in China
