= Telecommunications industry in China =

Chinese industry segment

The telecommunications industry in China (Note: This article discusses the telecommunications industry in mainland China. For Hong Kong and Macau, see Communications in Hong Kong and Communications in Macau) is dominated by three state-run businesses: China Telecom, China Unicom and China Mobile. The three companies were formed by restructuring launched in May 2008, directed by the Ministry of Information Industry (MII), National Development and Reform Commission (NDRC) and the Minister of Finance. Since then, all three companies gained nationwide fixed-line and cellular mobile telecom licenses in China. In 2019, all three telecoms were issued 5G national licenses.

As a result of China's entry to the World Trade Organization (WTO) in 2001, a new regulatory regime was established and foreign firms were allowed to access the market under restrictions.

In 2012, Huawei Technologies overtook Sweden's Ericsson to become the world's largest telecom equipment vendor. In that same year, there were over 284.3 million fixed-line telephone subscribers and 1.01 billion mobile phone subscribers in China.

As of 2021, China is the only country known to work towards a single-stack IPv6 network. The country announced plans in 2017 to lead globally in IPV6 adoption by 2025, and achieve full nationwide rollout by 2030. Experts believe that such a plan to widely adopt IPv6 for the country's internet infrastructure, can help China to increase its leadership in 5G and Internet of Things across multiple varying industries.

== Historical overview ==
Before 1994, the Ministry of Posts and Telecommunications (MTP) provided telecom services through its operational arm, China Telecom. Pressured by other ministries and dissenting customers, the Chinese government officially started the telecom industry reforms in 1994 by introducing a new competitor: China Unicom. China Unicom could hardly compete with the giant China Telecom.

In 1998, due to a ministerial reorganization, the MTP was replaced by the new Ministry of Information Industry (MII). The MII took two large scale reshuffling actions targeting the inefficient state-monopoly.

In 1999 the first restructuring split China Telecom's business into three parts (fixed-line, mobile and satellite). China Mobile and China Satcom were created to run, respectively, the mobile and satellite sectors but China Telecom continued to be a monopoly of fixed-line services.

The second restructuring in 2002 split China Telecom geographically into north and south: China Telecom - North kept 30% of the network resources and formed China Netcom (CNC) and 70% of the resources were retained by China Telecom - South or simply the new China Telecom. Parallel to this double fission, the telecommunications division of the Ministry of Railways (MOR) established a new actor in 2000: China TieTong.

These resources consisted of a 2,200,000 km long nationwide optical network, based on Asynchronous Transfer Mode (ATM), Synchronous Digital Hierarchy (SDH) and Dense Wavelength Division Multiplexing (DWDM) technologies and several submarine cables, in particular with the US, Japan, Germany, and Russia.

To sum up, the Chinese telecom industry has changed from a state-run monopolistic structure to a state-run oligopolistic structure.

In May 2008, MII, NDRC and Minister of Finance announced the third restructuring proposal and also launched three 3G licenses. With the rapid development and serious competition, Chinese telecom operators face challenges on shrinking landline users, too rapid of a growth in mobile businesses, low profit services and great gaps among the carriers. The third revolution was to combine six main telecom operators into three, aiming to develop 3G businesses and full telecom services, and avoiding monopolistic and over competition.

== Regulatory environment ==
The MII is responsible, among other duties, for elaborating regulations, allocating resources, granting licenses, supervising the competition, promoting research and development and service quality as well as for developing tariff rates. The MII has built up a nationwide regulatory system composed of Provincial Telecommunications Administrations (PTA) with regulatory functions within their respective provinces. A number of other significant institutions also influence the industry, such as the State Development and Reform Commission (SDRC).

Since 2014, the Cyberspace Administration of China is responsible for setting policy and the regulatory framework for user content generated in online social activities on Internet portals.

== Foreign participation ==
Before China's membership of the WTO in 2001, China protected its emerging national telecom industry which was and still is regarded as a national priority sector. Only foreign equipment vendors were allowed to invest in China. Authorization for the investments was conditioned on technology transfer. International telecom carriers were banned from accessing the market.

As part of its commitments to the WTO, the Chinese government is gradually opening the carrier market to foreign investors. There are some geographical limits to this opening which will be progressively relaxed. In 2005, foreign investors were authorized to form joint ventures, investing up to 50% in Internet services in the whole country, up to 49% in the mobile sector in 17 major Chinese cities and up to 25% in fixed-line basic services in Beijing, Shanghai, and Guangzhou (Canton). Finding a Chinese partner to form a joint venture with, preferably a major carrier, is mandatory for a foreign company wishing to access the Chinese market.

Foreign investments have come, in order of importance, from the United States, Canada, Sweden, Finland, Germany, France, Japan, and South Korea. Many companies from these countries have established one or more joint ventures, not all of which have been successful.

== Market overview ==
As of March 2012, China has 284.3 million fixed-line subscribers and 1.01 billion mobile customers. Chinese telecom operators focus their effort on voice. Revenues from data only account 5%. New technologies are being deployed to provide differential services. These technologies include ADSL, wireless LAN technology, IP (Internet Protocol) telephony and services associated with mobile communications such as Short Messaging Service (SMS), Multimedia Messaging Service (MMS), ring tone download etc. Premium SMS connectivity is allowing entrepreneurs and established businesses to profit from revenue taken directly from users' monthly phone bills or pre-paid credit. One of the first companies to offer such Chinese Premium SMS connectivity to the world market and to advise on the regulations and requirements involved are mBILL. Chinese operators are often cautious in purchasing cutting-edge technologies. Mobile communication, especially Global System for Mobile (GSM) is the most profitable sub sector and reports 46% of all total revenues.

Halfway between mobile and fixed, Xiaolingtong is a limited mobility service based on Personal Access System (PAS)/Personal Handy Phone System (PHS) technology. It consists of a wireless local loop that provides access to the fixed-line network. With over 50 million users, PAS/PHS competes in big cities head to head with traditional mobile services since prices are typically far cheaper.

== Telecom operators ==
As of 2009, the telecom operators in China are exclusively Chinese: two fixed-line operators with nationwide licenses - China Telecom and China Unicom, three mobile carriers - China Telecom (CDMA and CDMA2000), China Mobile (GSM and TD-SCDMA) and China Unicom (GSM and WCDMA). The State has control and majority ownership of all of them. Most of them are financed in Hong Kong.

- China Telecom is one of the largest telecommunication SOEs in China, including 31 semi-autonomous provincial enterprises in mainland China. It runs land-line and mobile phone networks, operates a PAS system and provides telecom network-based voice, data, multimedia and information services. In 2008, the company acquired CDMA network from China Unicom. A second focus point is broadband based on Ethernet and ADSL. In Jan 2009, China Telcom was one of the three companies having a 3G license, CDMA2000.
- China Mobile operates basic GSM services and value-added services such as General Packet Radio Service (GPRS) data transfer, a TD-SCDMA 3G network, IP telephony and multimedia. It ranks the first in the world in terms of network scale and customer base.
- China Unicom merged with China Netcom in October 2008 and obtained a WCDMA license in January 2009. The company offers mobile phone services, operates domestic and international landline networks, and provides broadband multimedia services, IP telephony, and value-added services.
- China Netcom was acquired by China Unicom in October 2008.
- China Satcom was licensed to engage in all kinds of satellite related services such as transponder lease, domestic television broadcasting, public very-small-aperture terminal (VSAT) communications, video conferencing, data broadcasting, IP telephony, and satellite-based high-speed Internet access. In March 2009, the company announced its basic telephone services (excluding satellite transponder lease and sales) were merged with China Telecom. The rest of the assets including the company would be acquired by China Aerospace Science and Technology Corporation.
- China TieTong, formerly affiliated with the national rail network, is a smaller operator that merged with China Mobile in May 2008.
- China Voice Holdings Corp is also licensed to engage in video conferencing, data broadcasting, IP telephony, and satellite-based high-speed Internet access and is the largest corporation in conjunction with foreign owned corporations which hold many of the state-run contracts for the Chinese government.

== Network equipment suppliers in China ==
A large number of Chinese companies compete now with foreign corporations not only in the Chinese market but also in other countries. Datang is the main TD-SCDMA manufacturer, and UTStarcom, the main PAS/PHS manufacturer. Huawei leads the SMS market and Great Wall stands out in the broadband sector. Other recognized Chinese equipment suppliers are Shanghai Bell (subsidiary of Nokia) and Zhongxing Telecommunications Equipment (ZTE). Furthermore, Amoi, Konka Group, Ningbo Bird and Kejan are the most representative Chinese mobile phone manufacturers.

== Online and mobile gaming ==
Chinese fixed line telecom operators will work with their business partners, online gaming operators and ISPs/ICPs, to provide online games and mobile games in 2005. This can be a market of billions of U.S. dollars. Online gaming/mobile gaming developers work with the telecom operators directly or work with gaming operators and ISPs/ICPs to market their games in China.

== Wireless LAN ==
Chinese fixed line telecom operators, China Telecom, China Netcom and China Tie Tong (formally China Railcom), may increase their efforts in building wireless LAN networks to provide their customers with fast and easy wireless access to the internet. The fixed-line telecom operators will continue to promote ADSL and other broadband access technologies in China.

== Public safety system ==
With increasing awareness of the importance of the government's ability to deal with critical situations, there is a growing demand for emergency response systems in China. Without an organization like the National Emergency Number Association (NENA) in the United States, China has not yet developed a national technical standard for its emergency response system. Large and economically well-off cities in China like Beijing, Tianjin, Nanning and Chengdu have started building public safety networks by introducing TETRA-based digital trunking systems that integrate with their existing analogue systems. More Chinese cities followed in 2005. There has been development of database software, interoperability consoles and data management systems.

There has been an increasing use of Internet of Things (IoT) to install wireless intelligent fire, smoke and gas detection systems nationwide and China Mobile has installed over 100,000 NB-IoT intelligent fire alarm systems, including smoke, gas and temperature sensors, and fire alarms across the country.

== See also ==
- Mobile phone industry in China
- Communications in China
- Digital divide in China
- Electronic information industry in China
- Economy of China
- List of telecommunications regulatory bodies
