= China Telecommunications Corporation =

State-owned long-distance data transmission company

- Trade name: China Telecom
- Native name: 中国电信集团有限公司
- Formerly: Directorate General of Telecommunications
- Type: State-owned enterprise
- Industry: Holding company
- Founded: 27 April 1995; 31 years ago
- Founder: Ministry of Post and Telecommunications
- Headquarters: Beijing, China; Shanghai, China
- Areas served: China, Philippines
- Revenue: US$ 87.9 billion (2023)
- Net income: US$ 2.2 billion (2023)
- Total assets: US$ 151.9 billion (2023)
- Owner: Chinese Government (100%)
- Number of employees: 391,691 (2023)
- Subsidiaries: Besttone Holding; China Communications Services; China Telecom; Dito Telecommunity (40%)
- Website: chinatelecom.com.cn

China Telecommunications Corporation (中国电信集团有限公司) is a Chinese state-owned telecommunication conglomerate. It is the principal landline telecommunication provider of China and the second-largest mobile telecommunication provider in China.

The corporation has three listed companies: China Telecom Corporation Limited (中国电信股份有限公司), China Communications Services Corporation Limited (中国通信服务股份有限公司), and Besttone Holding (号百控股股份有限公司).

== History ==
The company originated as a government agency of the Ministry of Posts and Telecommunications. On 27 April 1995, it was registered as a separate legal entity as Directorate General of Telecommunications, P&T, China, using "China Telecom" as brand name. On 17 May 2000 it was registered as China Telecommunications Corporation. In May 2002, China Netcom Corporation was spun off as a separate company that was also supervised by the State-owned Assets Supervision and Administration Commission of the State Council directly. It also owned subsidiaries in Beijing, Tianjin, Hebei, Shanxi, Inner Mongolia, Liaoning, Jilin, Heilongjiang, Henan and Shandong that formerly belonged to China Telecommunications Corporation. According to the United States Department of Defense, the company has links to the People's Liberation Army.

On 10 September 2002, a subsidiary, China Telecom, was listed. The listed company gradually acquired the assets from China Telecommunications Corporation. As of 31 December 2016, however, China Telecommunications Corporation still owned the controlling stake in the company, for 70.89%.

In 2009 China Telecommunications Corporation received some of the assets of China Satellite Communications.

The company provides fixed-line and Xiaolingtong (Personal Handy-phone System) telephone services to 216 million people as of April 2008, and broadband internet access to over 38 million subscribers, providing approximately 62% (46 Gbit/s) of China's internet bandwidth. On 2 June 2008, China Telecommunications Corporation announced that it would purchase China Unicom's nationwide CDMA business and assets for CN¥110 billion, giving it 43 million mobile subscribers. According to the company, the listed portion of China Telecom Group (China Telecom Corp., Ltd.) paid CN¥43.8 billion, the unlisted portion of China Telecom Group (China Telecommunications Corporation) paid CN¥66.2 billion.

On 7 January 2009, China Telecommunications Corporation was awarded CDMA 2000 license to expand its business to 3G telecommunication.

=== U.S. sanctions ===
In November 2020, U.S. President Donald Trump issued an executive order prohibiting U.S. companies and individuals from owning shares in companies that the United States Department of Defense has listed as having links to the People's Liberation Army, which included China Telecom. In consequence of the executive order, the New York Stock Exchange delisted China Telecom in January 2021.

In December 2020, the United States Federal Communications Commission (FCC) initiated proceedings to revoke China Telecom's authorization to operate in the U.S. due to national security concerns. In October 2021, the FCC revoked China Telecom's operating license in the U.S. In March 2022, the FCC designated a U.S. subsidiary of the company, China Telecom (Americas) Corp, a national security threat. In December 2024, the United States Department of Commerce moved to crack down on China Telecom's cloud and internet routing business in the U.S.

== Consolidation and expansion ==
On 2 June 2008, the company announced it would acquire China Unicom's CDMA business and network for CN¥110 billion in cash, a series of transactions aimed at transforming the company into a fully integrated telecommunications operator.

Such shifts mark a new era for the telecommunications industry in China in which analyst have further commented that these changes are aimed at promoting a more fair and competitive industry environment.

China Telecom was chosen by the Chinese Government as an investor in the Philippines for providing telecom services. They were later chosen as 'provisional' telecommunications provider of the country after a bidding led by the Philippine government on November 7, 2018. As current laws restrict foreign ownership to 40%, China Telecom (through its parent company) forms a venture with local companies Udenna Corporation (owner of Phoenix Petroleum) and Chelsea Logistics under the franchise of Mindanao Islamic Telephone Company, Inc (or the Mislatel consortium). The selection was formalized on 20 November after the Philippine National Telecommunications Commission junked petitions from its rival bids. On 8 July 2019, Mislatel was renamed to Dito Telecommunity and at the same time, was granted its permit to operate. The firm began its commercial operations on 8 March 2021.

=== Subsidiaries ===
As of 9 July 2019

- Besttone Holding (58.45%, excluding shares held by China Telecom)
- China Communications Services
- China Telecom
- Dito Telecommunity (40% stake)

== Allegations of rerouted Internet traffic ==
On 8 April 2010, China Telecom rerouted about 15% of foreign Internet traffic through Chinese servers for 18 minutes. The traffic included the commercial websites of Dell, IBM, Microsoft, and Yahoo! as well as U.S. government and military sites. China Telecom denied hijacking any Internet traffic.

== See also ==
- Communications in China
- Telecommunications industry in China
- List of largest companies by revenue
- List of telephone operating companies
- List of telecommunications regulatory bodies
