= Digital divide in China =

Differences in access to information technologies

Over the past decade, there has been an increase in the use of information and communications technologies (ICTs) in China. As the largest developing country in the world, China faces a severe digital divide, which exists not only between mainland China and the developed countries, but also among its own regions and social groups.

== Overview ==
China's telecommunication sector has been growing at an annual rate of between 30% and 50% in the past ten years due to rapid political, economic, and social changes. However, like most developing countries, the national telephone density and the Internet- user rate remain relatively low, only 23% and 2.18% respectively in 2001. Moreover, the digital divide among regions and social groups inside China is severe.

The term digital divide refers to the gap between those with regular, effective access to Digital and information technology, and those without. It encompasses both physical access to technology hardware and skills and resources which allow for its use. It can refer to both international as well as domestic disparities in the access to information technology.

Since the implementation of China's Tenth Five Year Plan (2001-2005), the PRC has stressed the importance of information technology in its economic development. There is an optimism within the government that the "Internet and information technology (IT) are crucial factors for building international economic competitiveness and overcoming inter-regional development gaps at home." The plan classifies the building of an information society as key to China's economic development and modernization, with the belief that the development of IT will naturally pull the impoverished areas' economy out of poverty.

Statistics show that many parts of rural China are being left behind while the urban areas reap the benefits of the internet and IT. The China Internet Network Information Center (CNNIC) has released statistics showing continuous annual growth in internet users, yet such growth has been a predominantly urban phenomenon as the majority of China's internet users are located almost exclusively in China's big cities. Furthermore, there is little economic incentive for Internet Service Providers (ISPs) to expand into regions with low purchasing power and/or population densities. It is left to the Chinese government to bridge the ever-expanding gap of the digital divide.

== Statistics ==
The tables and pictures below show the geographical distribution of internet access in China. Internet density ranges from a high of 30.4% in Beijing to as low as 3.8% in the province of Guizhou. Just as startling as the differences in penetration rates is the vast disparity in the number of websites per person (table 2). Finally, the image of worldwideweb users in China portrays a graphic representation of the digital divide. We can infer from these statistics that users come from a relatively privileged strata of the population, dwelling in highly urbanized settings and concentrated in the prosperous Eastern regions.

=== Regional distribution of Internet access ===
The current situation of telephone application and Internet use indicates the severity of the digital divide among regions in Mainland China. Traditionally, Mainland China's regions have been divided into three categories according to their geographical location and administrative divisions: Eastern, Central, and Western. The Eastern region possessed the largest segment of total Internet users, and the Central and Western region possessed the smallest fraction respectively, more than two times lower than the Eastern region.

Most researchers found that there is a close linkage between geographic features and telecommunication application; this linkage shows that geographic accessibility relates significantly to telecommunication access. Generally, the geographic feature of each region from East to Central to West is marked by plain, hill and mountain respectively. The second factors are demographic indicators; the population density of these regions appears inversely opposite their geographical elevation: the Eastern region has the highest population density, followed by the Central region, while the West, the most geographically elevated, has the lowest population density. The third factor is the level of economic development in these regions, which paints a similar picture: the level of economic development is closely related to Internet access.

In particular, Internet users concentrate largely in metropolitan areas. The latest statistics by the China Internet Center show that Internet users in Beijing account for 12. 39 percent of the national total; Shanghai accounts for 8.98 percent, while the corresponding figures for Tibet and Qinghai Province in northwestern China are 0.0 percent and 0.31 percent, respectively.

Anhui	Internet Penetration rate by Year
Anhui	4.3% (2006)
Anhui	5.5%(2007)
Anhui	9.6%(2008)
Anhui	11.8%(2009)
Anhui	17.4%(2010)
Anhui	22.7%(2011)
Anhui	26.6%(2012)
Anhui	31.3%(2013)
Anhui	35.9%(2014)
Anhui	39.4% (2015)
Anhui	44.3%(2016)

Beijing	Internet Penetration rate by Year
Beijing	28.7%(2006)
Beijing	30.4%(2007)
Beijing	46.6%(2008)
Beijing	60%(2009)
Beijing	65.1%(2010)
Beijing	69.4%(2011)
Beijing	70.3%(2012)
Beijing	72.2%(2013)
Beijing	75.2%(2014)
Beijing	75.3%(2015)
Beijing	76.5%(2016)
Beijing	77.8%(2017)

Chongqing	Internet Penetration rate by Year
Chongqing	6.1%(2006)
Chongqing	7.9%(2007)
Chongqing	12.7%(2008)
Chongqing	21.2%(2009)
Chongqing	28.3%(2010)
Chongqing	34.6%(2011)
Chongqing	37%(2012)
Chongqing	40.9%(2013)
Chongqing	43.9%(2014)
Chongqing	45.7%(2015)
Chongqing	48.3%(2016)
Chongqing	51.6%(2017)

Fujian	Internet Penetration rate by Year
Fujian	11.3%(2006)
Fujian	14.6%(2007)
Fujian	24.3%(2008)
Fujian	38.5%(2009)
Fujian	45.2%(2010)
Fujian	50.9%(2011)
Fujian	57%(2012)
Fujian	61.3%(2013)
Fujian	64.1%(2014)
Fujian	65.5%(2015)
Fujian	69.6%(2016)
Fujian	69.7%(2017)

Gansu	Internet Penetration rate by Year
Gansu	4.8%(2006)
Gansu	5.9%(2007)
Gansu	8.4%(2008)
Gansu	12.5%(2009)
Gansu	20.4%(2010)
Gansu	24.8%(2011)
Gansu	27.4%(2012)
Gansu	31%(2013)
Gansu	34.7%(2014)
Gansu	36.8%(2015)
Gansu	38.8%(2016)
Gansu	42.4%(2017)

Region	Internet Penetration rate(2007)
Guangdong	19.9%
Shandong	12.2%
Jiangsu	13.7%
Zhejiang	19.9%
Sichuan	8.4%
Hebei	9.2%
Hubei	9.3%
Henan	5.5%
Shanghai	28.7%
Liaoning	11.4%
Hunan	6.4%
Shaanxi	10.6%
Shanxi	11.3%
Guangxi	8.0%
Heilongjiang	9.6%
Jiangxi	6.6%
Yunnan	6.2%
Jilin	10.0%
Tianjin	24.9%
Chongqing	7.9%
Inner Mongolia	6.7%
Xinjiang	7.7%
Guizhou	3.8%
Hainan	14.1%
Ningxia	7.0%
Qinghai	6.8%
Tibet	5.8%

==== Comparison of East/Middle/West in China internet development ====
	Penetration Rate	Domain Name Number/10,000 People	Website Number/10,000 People
East	14.0%	44.5	12.2
Middle	6.5%	7.9	2.0
West	6.9%	8.2	1.8
Nation	9.4%	22.0	5.9

=== Concentration of World Wide Web Users in Mainland China ===
We concentrate on China's digital divide as their country's population is huge. Nevertheless, they are also known as a fast-growing technology country which is also a new industrialized country.

==== Urban-rural areas ====
One of the main factors of the digital divide in China is location. Chinese citizens that reside in urban areas are much more likely to have access to the Internet than those who live in rural areas. More specifically, there is an Internet penetration rate of 50% in urban areas of China, but only 18.5% in rural areas of China.

China's telecommunication development is severely imbalanced between its rural and urban areas. Due to low population density and geographical disadvantages, rural areas experience a comparatively extremely high cost of investment in ICT infrastructure. By the end of 1998, China's rural areas had about 70 percent of the national population but only 20 percent of its total number of telephones. Compared to an urban telephone density of 27.7 percent, the rural telephone density of 2.85 percent is 10 times lower than urban telephone density in 1998.

Nevertheless, the situation of ICT development in rural China has improved gradually, thanks to general economic development and to the influx of ICT investment in rural areas. In 1998, the number of new telephone subscribers reached 6.913 million in rural areas, a 38.7 percent increase over 1997. The growth rate was two times more than that in urban areas. By the end of 1998, total telephone subscribers in rural area had reached 24.78 million; among them were 20.62 million rural household subscribers. The majority of the rural areas are in a digital divide as the government haven't developed the technology infrastructure here

==== Income levels ====
According to the OECD, income is a key factor in PC and Internet access. Access rates between the lowest and highest brackets range from country to country within the OECD –from 3 times more likely to 10 times more likely. The latest CNNIC survey indicates that 65 percent of China's Internet users earn an annual income of more than 6000 yuan; in contrast, the users who earn less than 6000 Yuan annually only share 15 percent of total Internet use. Although the non-income users do share 20 percent of Internet use, this fact may not undermine the importance of income because this 20 percent is more likely to represent students who usually receive a high living subsidy from their parents. Study of telephone subscription of farm households in rural China also proves that farm households with higher annual incomes are more likely to subscribe to a telephone than are low-income-level farm households.

==== Education levels ====
Differences in education levels are also highly correlated to PC and Internet access: those with higher levels of education are more likely to have ICTs at home and/or at work. Education is closely correlated to income, which obviously facilitates the purchase of ICTs and inclusion in the work environment. However, when income levels are taken into account, those with higher educational attainment will have higher rates of access. 91 percent of Chinese Internet users have a high school or above degree. A ZEF study on telephone access in rural China shows that heads of farm households with a primary level of education were more likely to subscribe to telephones than those without any level of education.

==== Gender divide ====
In China, a gender-based digital divide appears to be much smaller than education- and income-based divides. According to CNNIC's report from July 2011, 44.9% of Chinese Internet users are women.

== Factors contributing to the increase in the divide ==
Important structural changes in post-Mao China after Reform and Opening, beginning under Deng Xiaoping's leadership, must be considered in relation to the digital divide. The current urban-rural dual structure—or market-driven versus government-centered—is the underlying cause of the urban-rural divide. The digital divide between the two sectors could potentially intensify the current economic differences, causing more inequalities between the rural and urban sectors. It is also important to consider technology domestication or domestication theory.

In addition, China is facing the problem of digital divide due to imbalance of diffusion of ICTs infrastructure, high online charges, insufficiently trained staff, imperfect network legation, and information resource shortage in the Chinese language.

Insufficient infrastructure is a huge problem for achieving connectivity in rural areas, especially in the Western regions. There is currently a lack of incentive for telecommunication providers to invest in broadening their Western networks, mainly due to a lack of purchasing power and low population densities in these areas. The work of market forces push Internet Service Providers to "shy away from investing in these regions that show little promise of short-term profits."

Even if a rural area achieves the infrastructure for connectivity, high costs of internet-compatible computers remains a problem in rural areas. CNNIC touts that 26.6% of internet users have a monthly income of less than RMB 500, which is close to the average urban income of RMB 523. However, the average real income for the rural population is as low as RMB 187, deeming it impossibly expensive for the average rural person to access the internet.

The cost of internet usage in China is much higher than other nations. Many minimum wage workers in China cannot afford access to internet because the cost of having the internet is about 10 percent of their wage. The cost of internet usage in China as a percentage of income is 18 times the cost in South Korea and 51.5 times the cost in Japan. This data shows that because the cost of the internet is so high in China, many Chinese citizens cannot afford the internet. The digital divide in China is directly related to income.

For those who cannot afford computers, inadequate funding and geographical coverage for public libraries which could provide shared internet access is another factor. Those without computers are also facing a new limited access to Internet cafés. The Ministry of Culture and the Ministry of Information Industry have both issued a notice forbidding the opening of any new internet bars for the year 2007.

Illiteracy is a major problem that contributes to the digital divide between the rural and urban areas. It is "not unusual to find districts and towns with 20% of the population not being able to read or write properly, and less than 5% of children attending school". It is necessary that the government undertake efforts to improve education in the Western regions if it wants to build its information society and bridge the digital divide.

== Factors contributing to the reduction in the divide ==
The United Nations Development Programme (UNDP) in China is running a 2.5 million dollar project for taking internet access to rural areas of China. Also, the 'Go West' project in the Tenth Five-Year Plan (2001–2005) calls for the improvement of infrastructure in Western regions. Although it mainly aims at improving transportation infrastructure, approximately one million kilometers of new fibre-optic were laid alongside the installation of satellite telecommunications facilities between the years 2001 and 2005.

== Telecommunications policies and reforms ==
Under its unique macro-economic and political environment, the China has adopted a special telecommunications policy and strategy for telecommunications reform. As a fundamental and strategic industry, the Ministry of Posts and Telecommunications (MPT) of China has monopolized telecommunication operations for more than four decades. Recognizing its incapability of monopolizing the huge market and of meeting increasing demand, China launched a telecommunications reform that has been aimed at full competition. As the result, the basic telecommunication market advanced from a monopoly to a duopoly, and it is now being extended to pluralistic competition. In 1994, China Unicom was formed and allowed to build and to operate nationwide cellular networks. To promote fair competition in the paging service, the paging sector of China Telecom was split in 1998 to form Guoxin Paging Ltd.

Aiming at a deep reform, a new round of reform was launched in 1998. The basic idea was to form a fair market by breaking up CT and at the same time to strengthen Unicom through market restructuring. China Telecom Hong Kong, China Mobile Group, Jitong, and China Net Communication were formed. Competition has taken place among state-owned institutions.

With the goal of completely separating government and enterprise functions, the Ministry of Information Industry was established in 1998. MII became a neutral regulator by taking over the regulatory functions of MPT, while ceding the functions of enterprise. MII was organized into departments responsible for policymaking, administration, market regulation, and internal affairs.

In parallel with reform and reorganization, the China also gave high priority to the legislature work and industrial supervision of telecommunications. In 2000, Regulations of Telecommunications of the People's Republic of China and the Administrative Methods of Internet Services were promulgated, a centralized telecommunication regulatory body was created, and the development of China's telecommunications and industrial administration were put on the track of the rule of law.

To further accelerate the ICT development, the national Ninth Five-Year Plan established an information and telecommunication industry as one of the crucial industry. With the reform as the driving force, China's telecommunications developed steadily and rapidly throughout the Ninth Five-Year Plan period. The Tenth Five-Year Plan period will continue to make it a basic national policy to further China through science and technology, to push industrialization by virtue of the IT development and to explore a path for IT development suited to the national conditions.

In addition, the China's accession to WTO is generally recognized as an external drive force to deepen and accelerate the telecommunication reform, because the domestic telecommunication market has gradually opened up to foreign investors and competitors.

== DOT Force ==
According to the Okinawa Charter on the Global Information Society, the Digital Opportunity Task Force (DOT Force) looked into activities aimed at eliminating this threat to global development. Although China did not take a part in the G8 conference, China formed its own DOT Force strategy. Generally speaking, the DOT Force was a comprehensive systems engineering project. All of the stakeholders including the Chinese government, state-owned enterprises, private companies, research institutes and universities have played a role in trying to bridge the national digital divide.

First it created a national strategy of informatization. China has formulated the policy of national informatization construction to promote upgrading and optimizing of Chinese industries while realizing industrialization and modernization. In the ninth and tenth five-plan, China gives priority attention to the important role of the information and communication industry. Meanwhile, a series of important informatization application projects represented by Golden Card, Golden Bridge and Golden Gate have been initiated one after another, which have strongly promoted the informatization construction. Social informatization was drawn up as the strategic initiative underlying the whole modernization drive to achieve leap-frogging social and economic development.

Second is the online and enterprise online program that was initiated in the mid-1990s to mobilize the governments at all level online to facilitate information access for all citizens. The aim of the program was that 30%, 60%, and 80% of all levels of government would be online by 1998, 1999, and 2000; 100 large conglomerates, 10,000 midsize firms, and 1,000,000 small firms to be wired within 2000. These e-government program not only allow people to promptly obtain information on government policies, regulations, law and enterprise services, but also is a crucial initiative drive to bridge the domestic digital divide between the information "haves" and "have nots" nationwide.

Third is a special expenditure for bridging the digital divide among regions. It was clear that bridging the digital divide was difficult without special expenditure from national budgets. China has not only invested heavily in the creation of the telecommunication infrastructure, but also the universal telecommunication access in rural and remote areas. To bridge the widening Internet-connection gap between rural and urban areas, China has recently launched the "Every Village has a Phone" and "Gold Farm Engineering" project, which promoted telephone access and Internet application in rural areas. 5,000 networked telephones have been installed in rural areas, and more than 200 agricultural websites have been created. In particular, great efforts have been made to accelerate the construction and improvement of the IT infrastructure to satisfy the socio-economic needs of western regions of the country. China has drawn up a series of favorite policies to encourage the domestic and foreign investors participate in the investment and building of the information industry in the western regions. Moreover, especial efforts have been made by the government to cultivate a number of promising IT industries in the western regions.

Fourth is the action to narrow down the digital divide that caused by the difference in education and gender. China supported colleges and universities to educate people how to use ICTs and how to benefit from the ICT application. After networked universities and important institutes, China initiated long distance education facilities in less developing region, in particular, the rural and west regions. For instance, under support from Australia and the World Bank, Ningxia launched a distance learning center (DLC) recently, which will help promote development and poverty reduction in this western province of China by introducing the use of information and communication technology to promote distance learning as well as information and knowledge dissemination. Using state-of-the art distance learning technology, the DLC allows participants from across China, and other East Asian countries, and even other continents, to share information and learn together without leaving their hometowns.

Fifth is the state allowed the private sectors to provide information services. This policy significantly helped the spread of Website development and Internet cafés throughout the country. As a result, the severe competition from the private sectors undermined the monopoly of state-owned Internet service providers and brought the cost of Internet access down to an affordable level for a large proportion of the population and a rapid increase in the number of Internet users.

== See also ==
- Internet in China
- Education in China
- E-readiness
- Telecommunications industry in China

== External links and further reading ==
=== Organizations ===
- Internet Society of China
- China Education and Research Network Center
- China Internet Network Information Center
- EU-China Information Society

=== Further reading ===
- The Digital Divide: Lessons from the People's Republic of China Dr. Jonathan Harrington; Troy State University
- Bridging the Within-Country Digital Divide in Education: Improving Education in Western China through Innovative Use of ICTs Zhou Nan-zhao; Chief of APEID, UNESCO
- Distance learning project bridges the digital divide in China Rong Jiaojiao; UNICEF - China
