= First International (disambiguation) =

The First International is an alternate name for the International Workingmen's Association, an international organisation of left-wing radicals founded in 1864.

First International may also refer to:

- IWA–AIT or International Workers' Association, an anarcho-syndicalist federation of trade unions founded in 1922
- First International Syndicalist Congress, a meeting of European and Latin American syndicalists in London in 1913
- First International Conference of American States
- First International Eugenics Conference, a conference of eugenicists in London in 1912.
- International Peace Congress, an 1848 peace convention

In business:

- First International Computer, a Taiwanese computer company
- First International Telecom, a Taiwanese mobile phone operator

In religion:

- First International Congress on World Evangelization
- International Bahá'í Council

In banking:

- First International Bank, an American bank founded in 1910
- First International Bank of Israel, an Israeli bank founded in 1972
  - First International Bank Tower, the building which houses the Israeli bank
