= Pepsi P1 =

Smartphone model

Pepsi P1 and P1S
- Brand: PepsiCo
- Manufacturer: Shenzhen Koobee Communication Equipment Co., Ltd
- Type: Smartphone
- First released: November 2015; 10 years ago (China)
- Compatible networks: 4G LTE (Pepsi P1); China Unicom FDD-LTE (Pepsi P1S)
- Form factor: Phablet
- Dimensions: 152.2 mm (5.99 in) × 76.2 mm (3.00 in) × 7.7 mm (0.30 in)
- Weight: 158 g (5.6 oz)
- Operating system: dido OS 6.1 (based on Android 5.1 Lollipop)
- System-on-chip: MediaTek MT6592
- GPU: Mali 450-MP4
- Memory: 2GB RAM
- Storage: 16GB
- Removable storage: Micro SD card (can't be used alongside a second SIM card)
- Battery: 3,000mAh
- Rear camera: 13MP with LED flash
- Front camera: 5MP
- Display: 5.5 in (140 mm) 1080p 2.5D display
- Connectivity: 4G LTE / 3G, WiFi 802.1 b/g/n, Bluetooth 4.0, GPS, Micro USB

The Pepsi P1 and Pepsi P1S are Android smartphones manufactured by Koobee, an OEM, under licence from PepsiCo. They were only available through a crowdfunding campaign on Chinese crowdfunding site JD.com in 2015.

== Software ==
The phone runs dido OS, which is a fork of Android that also ships preloaded on a number of Doogee phones (including the Y6 Max), but the P1 and P1S includes a Pepsi-themed skin by default instead of the standard dido OS skin that ships on Doogee phones.
