= China Mobile Tietong =

Chinese state-owned telecommunications operator

- Native name: 中移铁通有限公司
- Formerly: China Tietong Telecommunications Corporation; China Railway Communication Corporation, Limited
- Company type: Private subsidiary of China Mobile
- Industry: Telecommunications
- Founded: December 20, 2000; 25 years ago
- Fate: Acquired by China Mobile in 2008
- Headquarters: Beijing, China
- Area served: Mainland China
- Products: ADSL, fixed line, Internet backhaul network
- Website: chinatietong.com

China Mobile Tietong (Chinese: 中移铁通有限公司) is a major state-owned basic telecommunications operator in China. Its former name was China Tietong Telecommunications Corporation (abbr. CTT; Chinese: "中国铁通集团有限公司", or abbr. "中国铁通") and also China Railcom (China Railway Communication Corporation, Limited).

== History ==
Founded on December 20, 2000, on January 20, 2004 it was shifted from the Ministry of Railways of the People's Republic of China to the administration of the State-owned Assets Supervision and Administration Commission of the State Council, while it was renamed CTT.

On May 23, 2008, China Tietong was acquired by China Mobile Communications Corp, the state-owned parent company of listed company China Mobile. According to China Mobile, Tietong "will remain relatively independent for the time being".

== Business ==
China Mobile Tietong's main areas of business are providing ADSL and dial-up internet services and selling backhaul on their nationwide backbone network, and the company also has a number of fixed-line telephone subscribers. Lacking access to each home, they work very closely with the cable television provider of each major city and usually offer lower price compared to its competitors. China Mobile Tietong is the third largest fixed-line internet service provider in China, after China Telecom and China Netcom.

== See also ==
- Communications in China
- Telecommunications industry in China
