= China Communications Services =

Communication Service Corporation

- Native name: 中国通信服务股份有限公司
- Company type: public
- Traded as: SEHK: 552
- Industry: Telecommunication vendor
- Founded: 2006
- Headquarters: Beijing, China, People's Republic of China
- Area served: People's Republic of China
- Key people: Chairman: Mr. Wang Xiaochu
- Products: telecommunication infrastructure services and outsourcing services
- Parent: China Telecommunications Corporation
- Website: chinaccs.com.hk

China Communications Services Corporation Limited
- Simplified Chinese: 中国通信服务股份有限公司
Transcriptions

China Communications Services
- Simplified Chinese: 中国通信服务
Transcriptions

China Communications Services Corporation Limited, doing business as China Comservice, is a subsidiary of China Telecommunications Corporation. It is engaged in providing telecommunication infrastructure services and outsourcing services to telecommunication operators and government organizations in China.

CCS was incorporated in the People's Republic of China in 2006. As a part of the restructuring, China Telecom Group transferred its telecommunication support businesses in Shanghai, Zhejiang, Fujian, Hubei, Guangdong and Hainan to CSS.CCS's H shares were listed on the Hong Kong Stock Exchange in 2006 and they were admitted to the Hang Seng China Enterprises Index from 2007 to 2010.

== See also ==
- List of telephone operating companies
