= Wang Jianzhou =

Chinese businessman

- 王建宙
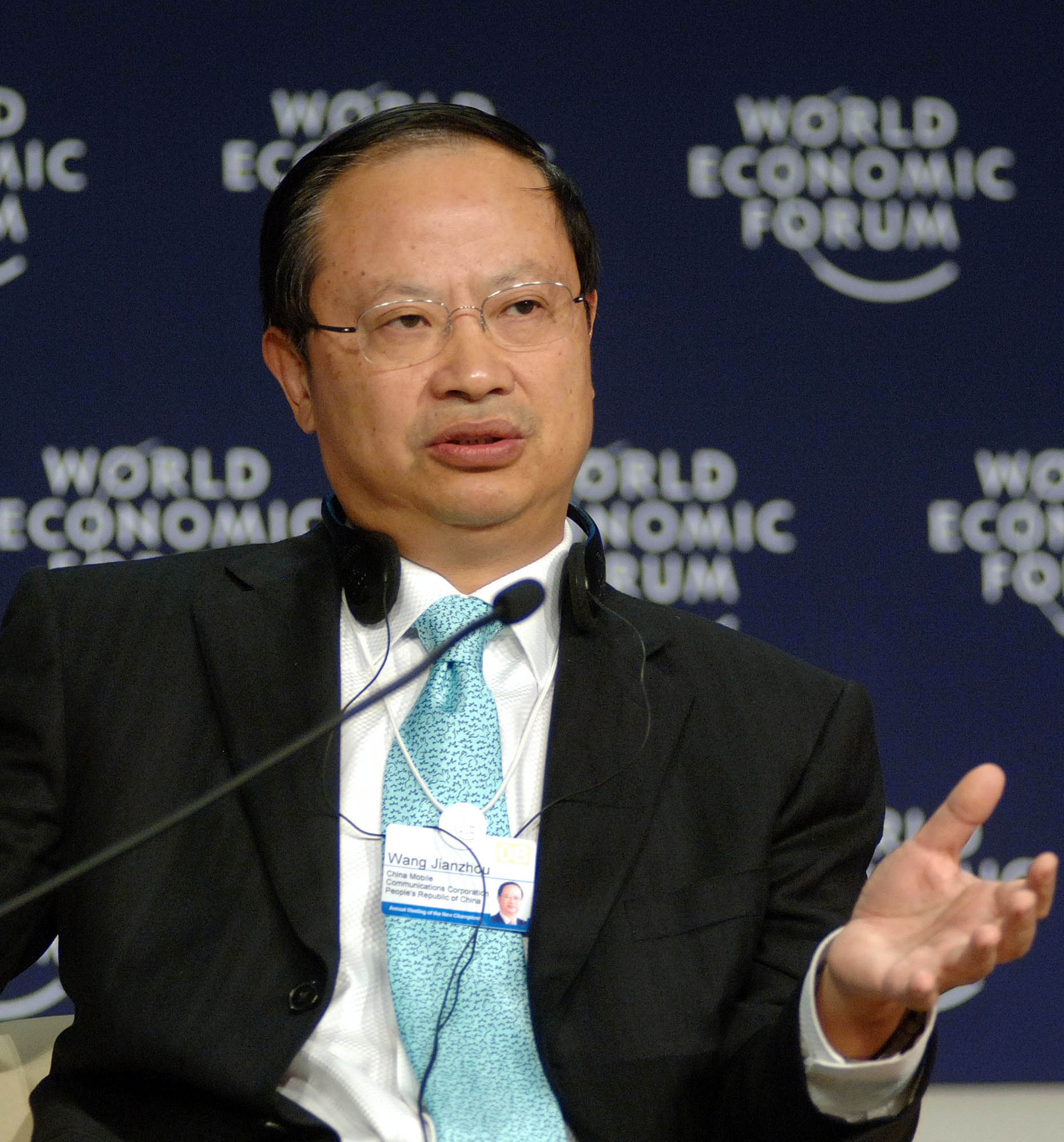
- Wang in 2008
- Education: Hong Kong Polytechnic University; Zhejiang University
- Known for: Chairman of China Mobile; President of the China Mobile Communications Corporation

Wang Jianzhou (Chinese: 王建宙; pinyin: Wáng Jiànzhòu; born December 1948 in Wenzhou, Zhejiang), is Chinese business executive. His roles included being the former chairman of China Mobile.

== Biography ==
Wang did his undergraduate and postgraduate studies both at Zhejiang University (ZJU). Wang received a master's degree of industrial management from ZJU in 1985. Wang also obtained a doctorate in business administration from the Hong Kong Polytechnic University.

Wang was the Chief Director of the Posts and Telecommunications Bureau of Zhejiang Province in Hangzhou. In 1996, Wang became a director in the Ministry of Posts and Telecommunications of People's Republic of China.

In 2001, Wang was appointed to be the president of the China Mobile Communications Corporation. In 2012, Wang stepped down "by reason of age".

In January 2013, The GSMA announced that it had appointed Jianzhou as a senior advisor to the firm.

== See also ==
- China Mobile
