= China Mobile =

Chinese state-owned telecommunications company

China Mobile Limited 中国移动通信集团公司

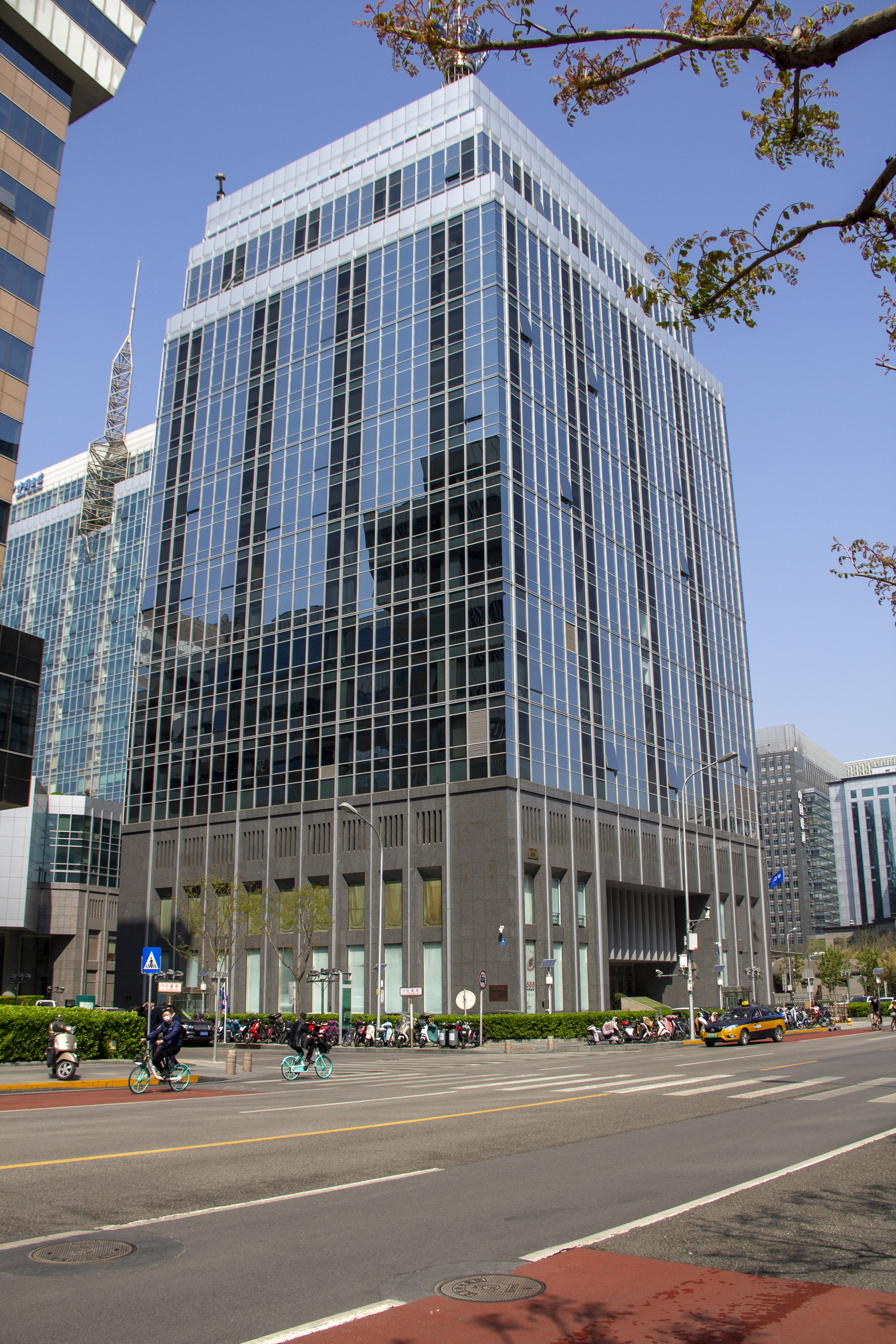
- Headquarters in Beijing
- Type: Public; State-owned enterprise
- Traded as: SSE: 600941 (A-share); SEHK: 941 (H share); Hang Seng Index component; CSI A50
- ISIN: HK0941009539
- Industry: Telecommunications
- Predecessor: China Telecom (Hong Kong) Limited
- Founded: 3 September 1997; 29 years ago
- Headquarters: Beijing, China; Shanghai, China
- Areas served: China; Hong Kong (as CMHK); Pakistan (as Zong); Japan, Thailand, United Kingdom, Singapore, Italy and Canada (as CMLink)
- Key people: Chen Zhongyue (Chairman)
- Products: Telecommunications equipment; SIM cards; Smart home devices
- Services: Fixed-line telephony; Mobile telephony; Broadband Internet access; Digital television; Internet television / IPTV; Cloud computing; IoT services; Artificial intelligence & computing services; 5G DICT solutions
- Revenue: ▲CN¥1,050.2 billion (2025)
- Operating income: ▲CN¥148.9 billion (2025)
- Net income: ▼CN¥137.1 billion (2025)
- Total assets: ▲CN¥2.13 trillion (2025)
- Total equity: ▲CN¥1.43 trillion (2025)
- Owner: Government of China (72.72%)
- Number of employees: 461,345 (2025)
- Parent: China Mobile Communications Group
Subsidiaries
CMHK	(100%)
Zong
CMLink
- ASNs: 9808 (China); 58453 (International)
- Traffic Levels: 10-20 Tbit/s
- Website: www.10086.cn www.chinamobileltd.com

China Mobile Limited
- Simplified Chinese: 中国移动有限公司
- Traditional Chinese: 中國移動有限公司
Transcriptions
Standard Mandarin
- Hanyu Pinyin: Zhōngguó Yídòng Yǒu Xiàn Gōngsī

China Mobile Communications Group Co., Ltd.
- Simplified Chinese: 中国移动通信集团有限公司
- Traditional Chinese: 中國移動通信集團有限公司
Transcriptions
Standard Mandarin
- Hanyu Pinyin: Zhōngguó yídòng tōngxìn jítuán yǒuxiàn gōngsī

Second alternative Chinese name
- Simplified Chinese: 中国移动
- Traditional Chinese: 中國移動
- Literal meaning: China Mobile
Transcriptions
Standard Mandarin
- Hanyu Pinyin: Zhōngguó Yídòng

China Mobile is the trade name of both China Mobile Limited, and its ultimate controlling shareholder, China Mobile Communications Group Co., Ltd., a Chinese state-owned telecommunications company. It provides mobile voice and multimedia services through its nationwide mobile telecommunications network across mainland China and Hong Kong. China Mobile is the largest wireless carrier in China, with 945.50 million subscribers as of June 2021. China Mobile was ranked #25 in Forbes' Global 2000 in 2023.

China Mobile is listed on the Shanghai Stock Exchange as A-shares and the Hong Kong Stock Exchange as H shares. It is the world's largest mobile network operator by total number of subscribers, and the world's largest telecommunications company by revenue.

As of 8 July 2025, China Mobile Limited's total market value stood at US$240 billion.

== History ==
Incorporated in 1997 as China Telecom (Hong Kong) Limited, China Mobile was born from the 1999 break-up of China Telecommunications Corporation. This company continues to provide mobile services, however.

In May 2008, the company took over China Tietong, a fixed-line telecom and the then third-largest broadband Internet service provider in China adding Internet services to its core business of mobile services.

In October 2014, Nokia and China Mobile signed a $970 million framework deal for delivery between 2014 and 2015.

China Mobile is among the state entities which contribute to the China Integrated Circuit Industry Investment Fund, which was established in an effort to decrease China's reliance on foreign semiconductor companies. The fund was established in 2014.

In December 2021, China Mobile announced that its international arm would cease operations in Canada due to national security concerns by the Canadian government.

=== U.S. sanctions ===
In November 2020, President Donald Trump issued an executive order prohibiting any American company or individual from owning shares in companies that the United States Department of Defense has listed as having links to the People's Liberation Army, which included China Mobile. On 31 December 2020, the New York Stock Exchange announced that it would suspend trading in China Mobile, China Telecom, and China Unicom from 7 to 11 January 2021 and start the delisting process, causing stock values to drop. On 4 January the decision to delist was suddenly reversed; two days later, the NYSE said that the delistings would proceed. In the aftermath of the delisting, the company announced its decision to raise up to US$8.8 billion ahead of the Shanghai stock exchange listing, according to an official Weibo post by the company.

In March 2022, the Federal Communications Commission designated China Mobile's U.S. subsidiary, China Mobile International USA, a national security threat. In March 2025, the United States House Select Committee on Strategic Competition between the United States and the Chinese Communist Party initiated an inquiry into China Mobile and issued subpoenas for company records in April 2025 over security concerns. In June 2025, the FCC stated that China Mobile had failed to cooperate with its probe to determine whether it had evaded sanctions.

=== Operations in Russia ===
China Mobile has, like other major Chinese firms, maintained business in Russia amid the ongoing international sanctions during the Russian invasion of Ukraine. It is also alleged to have supported Russian propaganda during the invasion.

According to Ukraine's State Security Service (SBU), Hikvision and Dahua (of which China Mobile is a shareholder) hacked surveillance cameras have been used to gather intelligence on critical infrastructure and military movements such as during the 2 January 2024 Russian strikes in Kyiv, where two compromised outdoor cameras are said to have been used to guide the strikes.

== Ownership and control ==
A state-owned enterprise directly controlled by the government of the People's Republic of China and also a public company which is listed on the NYSE and the Hong Kong stock exchanges, China Mobile has dominated Chinese mobile services since its inception for civilian and military purposes. According to the United States Department of Defense, the company has links to the People's Liberation Army. As of 2010, China Mobile controls the vast majority of its domestic mobile services market with a 70% market share. China Unicom and China Telecom have 20% and 10% shares, respectively.

The company likely enjoys substantial protectionist benefits from China's government but also experiences frequent government intervention in its business affairs. Government control is maintained through a presumably government-owned holding company, China Mobile Communications Group Co., Ltd. (formerly: China Mobile Communications Corporation; CMCC), that owns 100 percent ownership of China Mobile (HK) Group Limited, which in turn holds over seventy percent ownership of China Mobile–the remainder being controlled by public investors. Established in 2000, CMCC is China Mobile Ltd's current parent company as of 2019.

China Mobile is one of the "core" central SOEs overseen by State-owned Assets Supervision and Administration Commission of the State Council (SASAC).

== Finances ==
The key trends for China Mobile are (as of the financial year ending 31 December):

	Revenue (HKD billions)	Net income (HKD billions)	Total assets (HKD billions)	Employees (thousands)
2018	873	140	1,752	459
2019	846	121	1,822	456
2020	863	121	2,049	454
2021	1,022	140	2,252	450
2022	1,090	146	2,173	451
2023	1,115	146	2,193	452
2024	1,128	150	2,243	455

== Services ==
=== Rural services ===
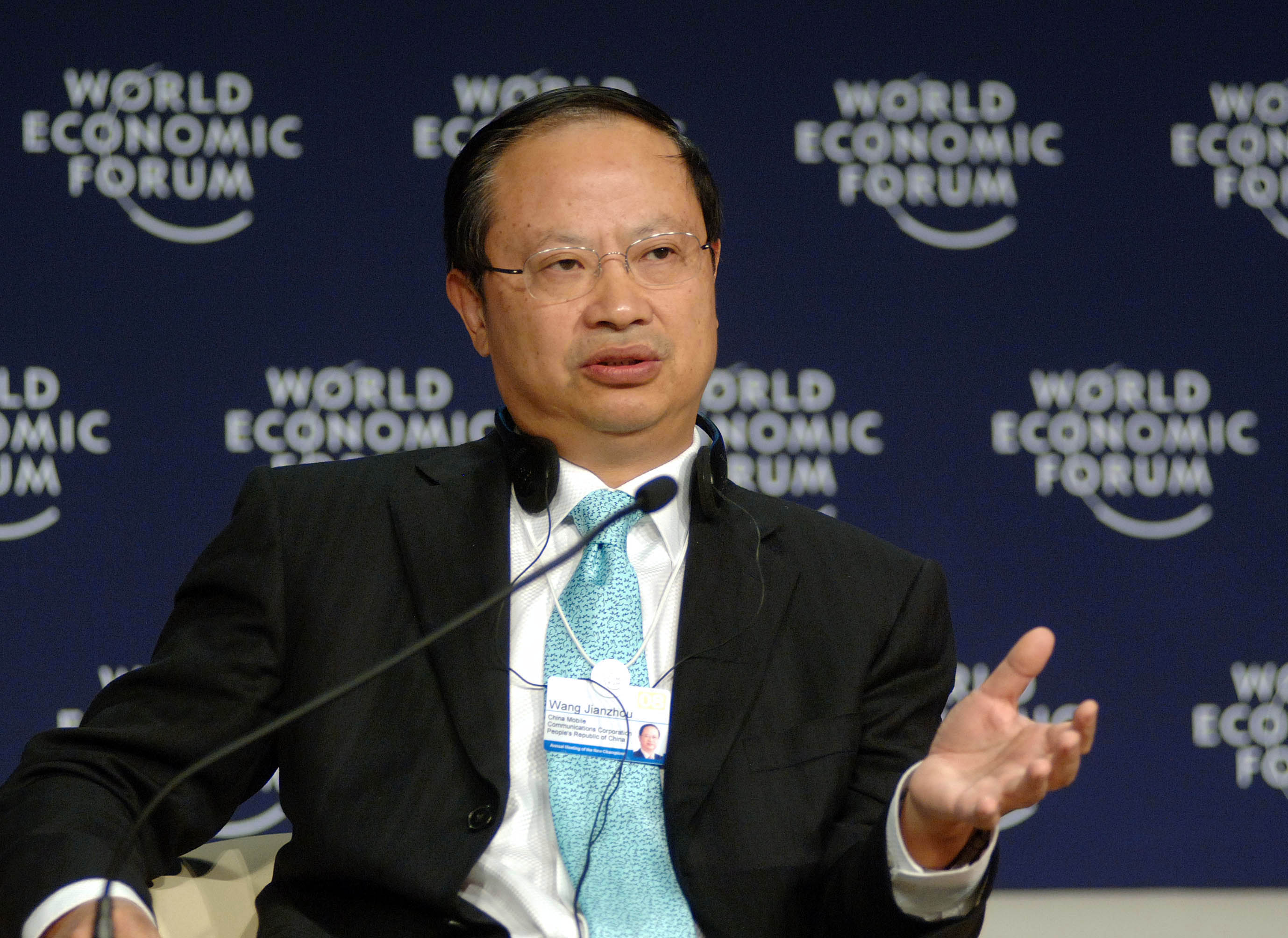
Wang Jianzhou, chairman and CEO during the Market Insight: Frontier Markets plenary session in Tianjin, China, 28 September 2008

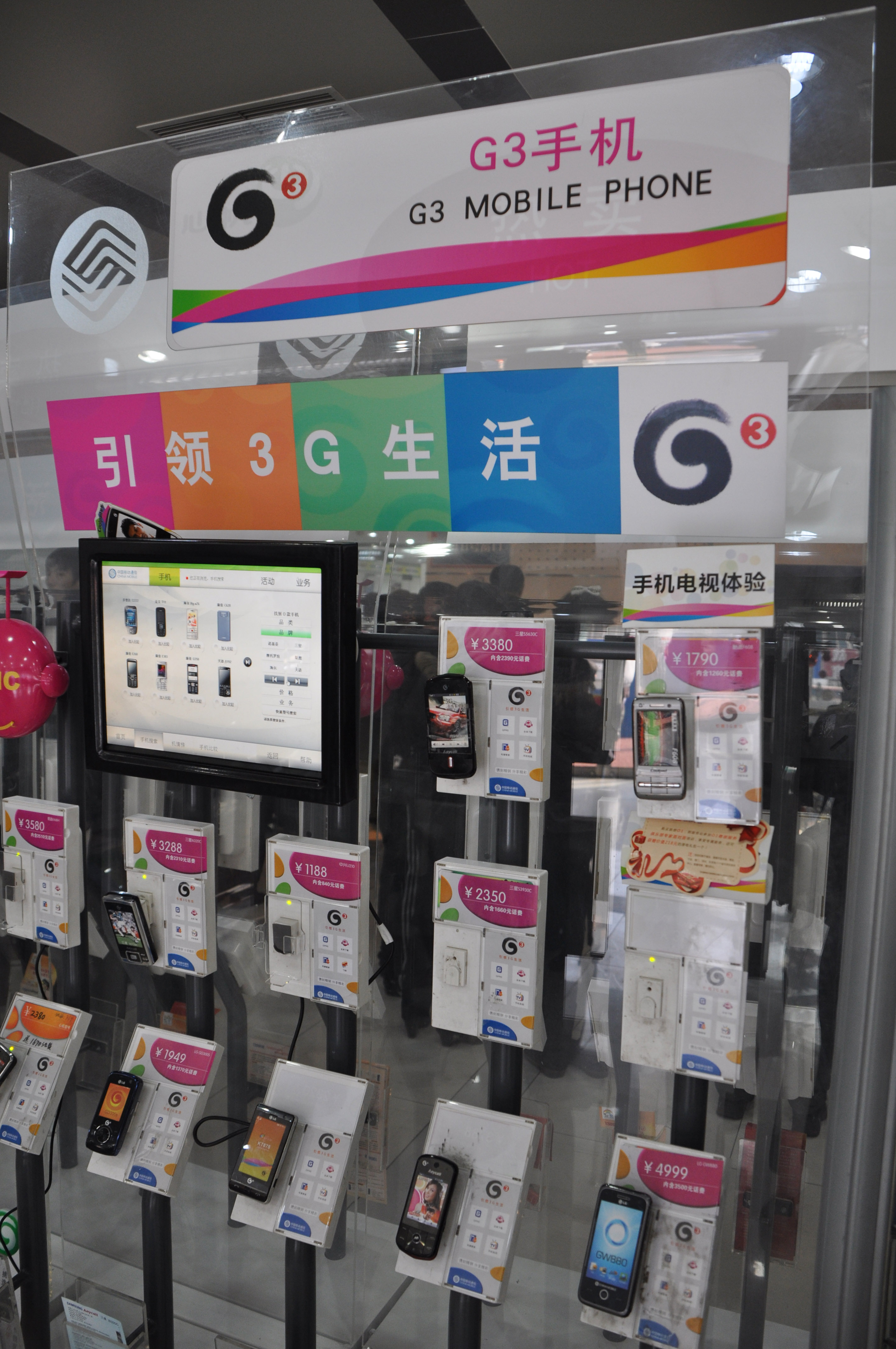
Display of China Mobile phones, 2010

China Mobile was one of six state-owned companies that implemented the Connecting Every Village Project, which the Ministry of Industry and Information Technology began in 2004 to promote universal access to telecommunication and internet services in rural China. The MIIT required that China Mobile and the other state-owned companies build the communications infrastructure and assist in financing the project. As of December 2019, 135 million rural households had used broadband internet. The program successfully extended internet infrastructure throughout rural China and promoted development of the internet.

China Mobile has historically held a greater share of the rural market than competitors. By 2006, its network had expanded to provide reception to 97% of the Chinese population, and the company has since seen a sustained stream of new, rural mobile customers.

It also offers services targeted at the rural market including an agricultural information service, which facilitates a variety of activities such as the sale and purchase of agricultural products, access to market prices for produce and crops, wire transfers, bank withdrawals, and payments, etc.

=== Overseas activities ===
The company branched out in 2007 with the purchase of Paktel in Pakistan launching the Zong brand there a year later.

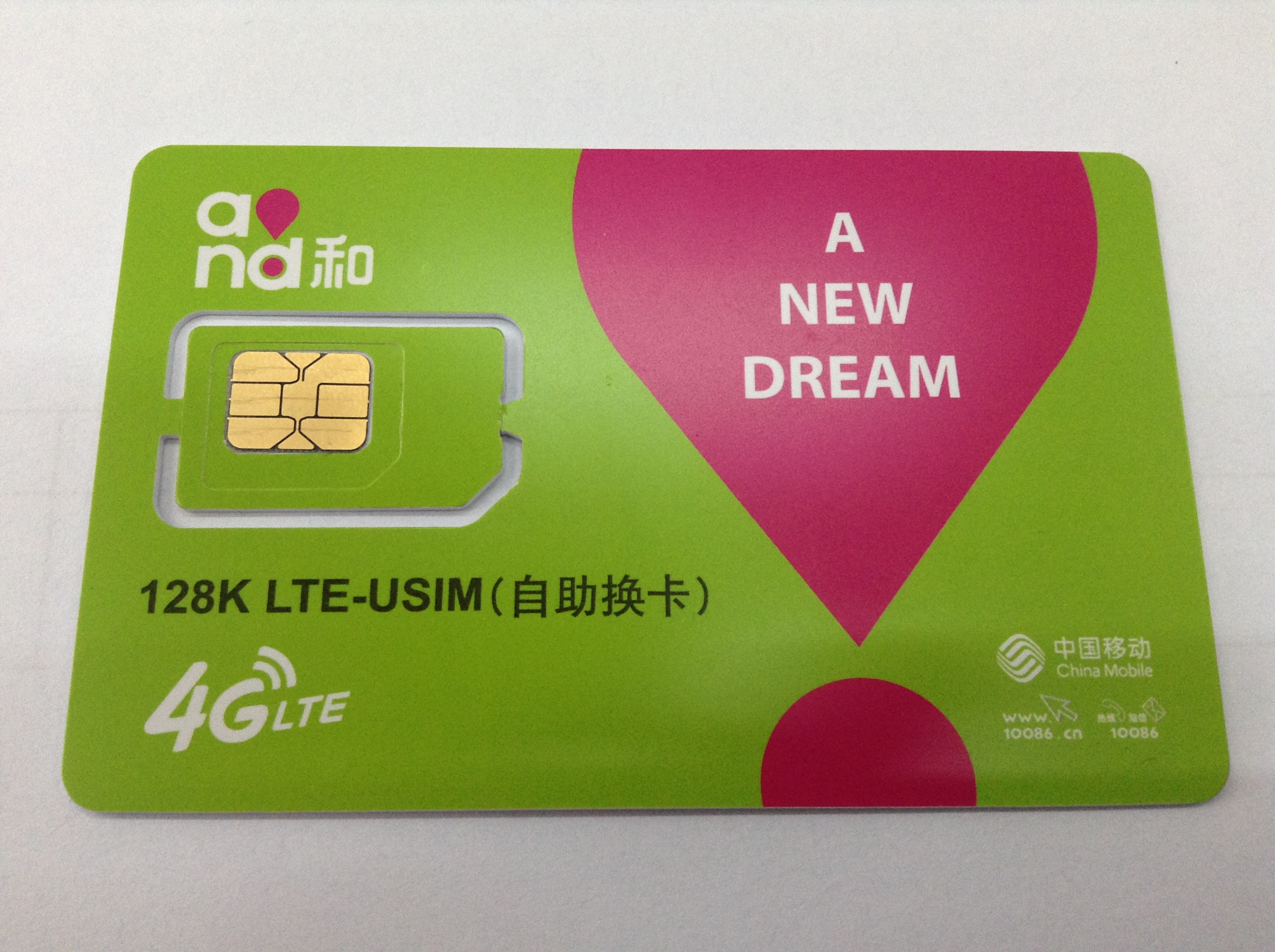
China Mobile SIM card

In 2013, China Mobile eyed expansion into Myanmar expressing interest in bidding for one of two licences on offer in a partnership with Vodafone although this plan ultimately fell through.

=== Digital barrier removal ===
In 2023, China Mobile's digital wallet users were able to make payments by scanning WeChat QR codes as part of a program to remove barriers between the ecosystems of technology companies in China.

=== Qianliyan ===
In 2020, China Mobile launched its Qianliyan ("Clairvoyance" or literally, "thousand-mile eyes") smart video products. This line includes networked cameras and a cloud platform to provide remote viewing, video storage, and analytics. With offerings geared towards private consumers and institutional users, the Qianliyan product line includes products like "Peaceful Village" (video monitoring geared towards rural roads, homes, farms, and fields), "Online Baby" (child monitoring), and "Bright Kitchen, Shining Stove" (food quality and safety monitoring).

== Brands ==
=== Mainland China ===
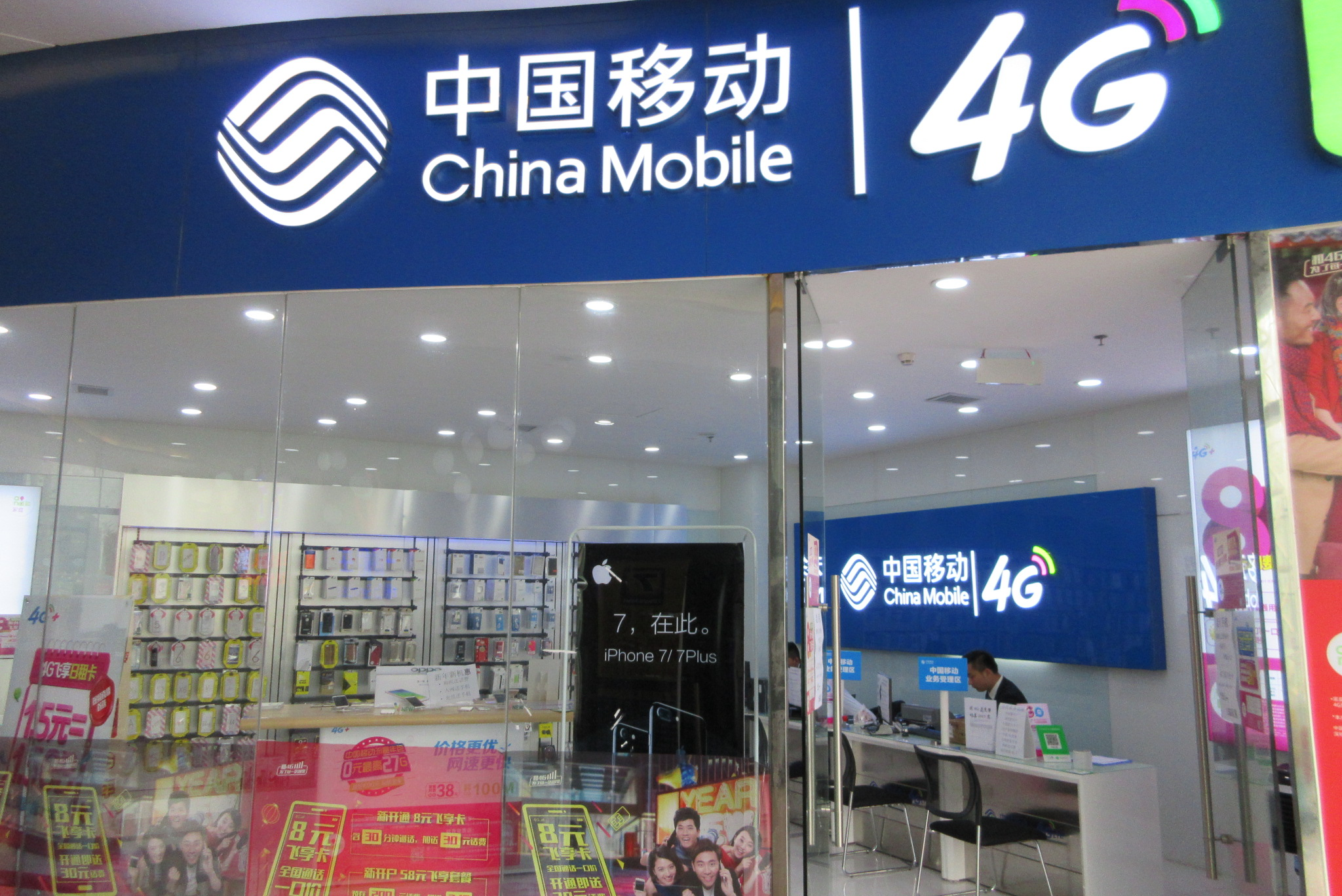
A China Mobile store in Shenzhen

Mobile services are available in Mainland China under several brands as of 2007. As of 2013, the below brands are scheduled to be slowly phased out and replaced by an all-encompassing new brand name—And—whose logo combines an exclamation point, the Chinese character for "peace" (和; Hé), as well as the English word "and".

GoTone

Chinese: 全球通; pinyin: Quánqiútōng (lit. "Global Connect"): a subscription flagship brand.

M-zone

Chinese: 动感地带; pinyin: Dònggǎndìdài (lit. "Dynamic Area"): a premium prepaid service popular with youths.

Easyown

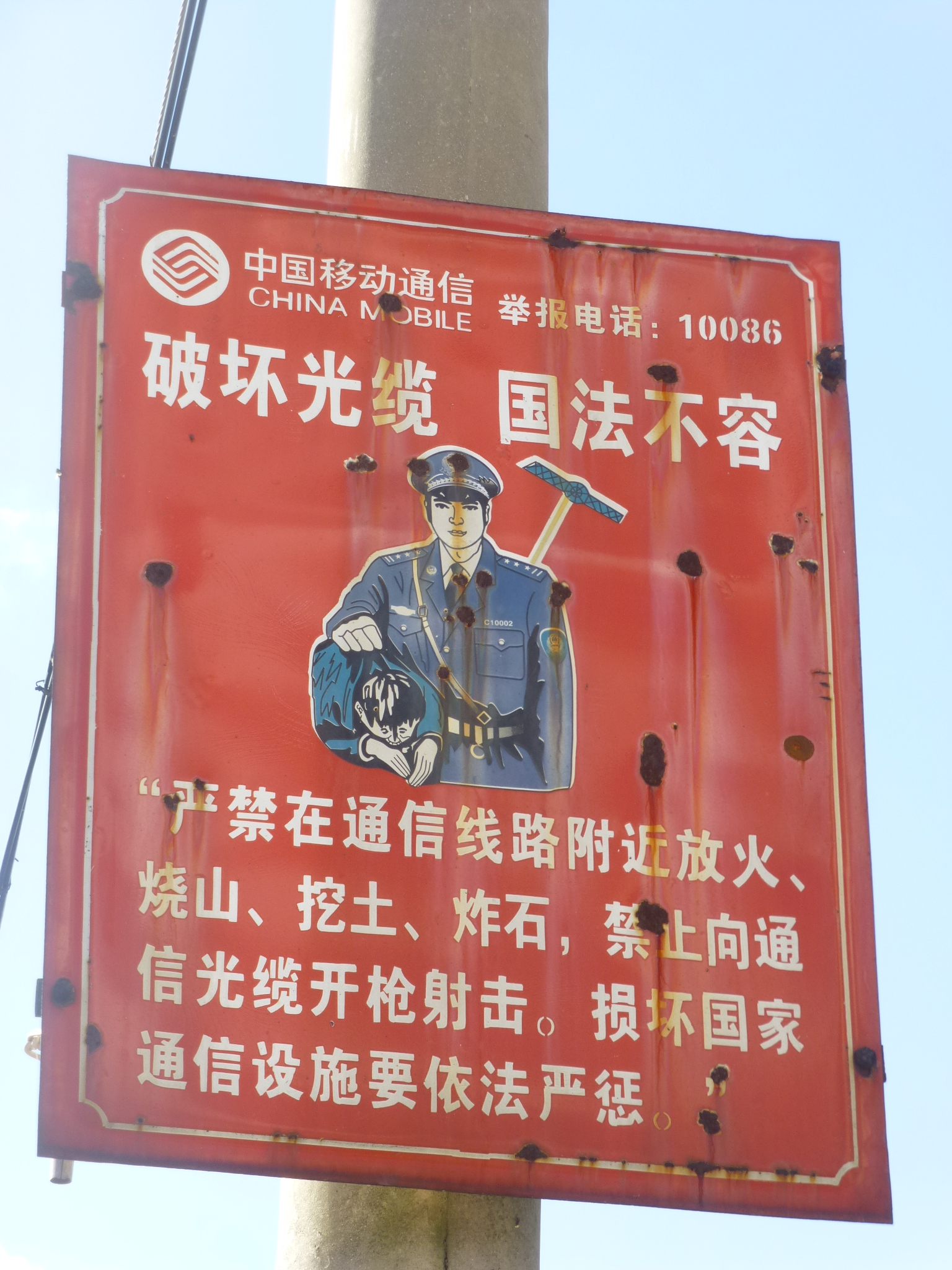
A sign near a China Mobile fiber-optic cable reminds of the legal responsibility for damaging telecommunication cables.

Chinese: 神州行; pinyin: Shénzhōuxíng (lit. "Travel across China"): a basic prepaid mobile phone service more heavily marketed in rural areas.

G3

A 3G service brand using TD-SCDMA.

=== Hong Kong ===
CMHK is a wholly owned subsidiary of China Mobile. It offers GSM, GPRS, EDGE, HSPA+ (MVNO), FD-LTE and TD-LTE technologies to customers in the Hong Kong Special Administrative Region.

=== Pakistan ===
Zong is China Mobile's brand in Pakistan and is operated by China Mobile Pakistan (CMPak), a subsidiary.

=== United Kingdom ===
In December 2017, China Mobile launched a MVNO service in the UK called CMLink. CMLink is aimed at the Chinese population living in the UK and Chinese visitors and students. Plans include free calls to China Mobile phones in China.

=== Singapore ===
In June 2020, China Mobile launched a MVNO service called CMLink. It uses Singtel networks, which is one of Singapore's largest mobile network operator.

CMLink is aimed at the Chinese population living in the Singapore and Chinese visitors and students. Plans include free calls to China Mobile phones in China.

== Network ==
China Mobile operates a GSM network, which encompasses all 31 provinces, autonomous regions, and directly administered municipalities in mainland China and includes Hong Kong, too. GPRS is utilized for data transmission.

3G

Marketed as "G3", the company controls 70% of the Chinese mobile market but a far smaller percentage of the 3G market. As of May 2012, its nearly 60 million 3G subscribers account for roughly 9% of its total subscriber base, which is an increase from 3% in 2010.

Its 3G network, still under construction in 2010, utilizes the TD-SCDMA standard, which China Mobile helped develop. 3G service is available in all of the 4 direct-controlled municipalities and most of the 283 prefecture-level cities in China as of 2010.

4G

Marketed as "and和", as of 2010, China Mobile has debuted small-scale 4G demonstration networks using a variant of 3GPP's Long Term Evolution, TD-LTE, and has plans for larger, citywide demonstration networks in the future. As of May 2012, such networks are in operation.

While prior iPhone models could not use the China Mobile network due to the chipset relying on WCDMA-based networks, talks to carry the then unreleased 4G iPhone (iPhone 5) began in mid-2012. The iPhone 5c and iPhone 5s were sold through China Mobile starting in January 2014.

5G

China Mobile is developing a 5G service marketed as 5G++. As part of this development, Huawei has been awarded 52 percent of 5G contracts in 2023 (estimated at 45,426 base stations).

Everest

In 2003 and again in 2007, China Mobile provided mobile services on Mount Everest.

Spratly Isles coverage

In May 2011, China Mobile announced its network now includes the controversial Spratly Islands.

== See also ==
- List of largest companies by revenue
- List of mobile network operators
- List of mobile network operators of the Americas
- List of mobile network operators of the Asia Pacific region
- List of mobile network operators of the Middle East and Africa
