= IDN.IDN =

IDN.IDN is an abbreviation for an Internationalized domain name whose Top level domain (TLD) is also internationalized, which could be transliterated .com, .net, .org, etc. or be groupings relevant to the language at hand.

== Culturally relevant proposals ==
- Chinese:
- Korean:
- Japanese:
- Russian:
- Hebrew:
  - שלום.דבר : shalom.dbr (dbr being roots of the verb 'to talk')
  - דפנה.שלי : daphne.shli (shli being a preposition 'of me,' for personal homepages, etc.)
- Arabic:
  - كوم : .com
  - نت : .net
  - اورج : .org

== Concerns and considerations ==
As this is an issue still being "decided upon," (for many years, apparently) there are many factors to be considered. Here are a few just thrown out to be edited around and made to look pretty.

- IDN.COM vs. IDN.IDN, important issue as IDN.COM is already available.
- Compatibility
- Punycode
- "branching off from the *main* internet" (various POVs)
  - Who Owns The Internet
  - The UN Resolution from meeting in Tunisia
- Localization
  - Transliteration of COM NET ORG vs. culturally significant TLD names of the languages' own choosing.
  - Right-to-left formatted languages such as Arabic and Hebrew
