= First International Telecom =

Former Taiwanese telecommunications company

First International Telecom (FITEL; Chinese: 大眾電信; pinyin: Dàzhòng Diànxìn) was a mobile phone operator in Taiwan. Launched in April 1997 as a paging company, FITEL expanded in May 2001 by launching a PHS network. It declared bankruptcy in 2014.

== See also ==
- List of companies of Taiwan
