= Telecommunications in China =

The People's Republic of China possesses a diversified communications system that links all parts of the country by Internet, telephone, telegraph, radio, and television. The country is served by an extensive system of automatic telephone exchanges connected by modern networks of fiber-optic cable, coaxial cable, microwave radio relay, and a domestic satellite system; cellular telephone service is widely available, expanding rapidly, and includes roaming service to foreign countries. Fiber to the x infrastructure has been expanded rapidly in recent years.

== History ==
Telegraphy was introduced to China in 1871 when a newly laid cable between Shanghai and Hong Kong connected Qing-era China to the British-dominated international telegraph network.

When the People's Republic was founded in 1949, the telecommunications systems and facilities in China first established by the Qing and Republican ITA and Ministry of Posts and Communications had been seriously damaged from over thirty years of on and off war between warlords, Japan, and the two sides of the Chinese Civil War. What little remained was largely outdated and rudimentary and limited to the eastern coastal cities, the Nanjing-Shanghai region, and a few interior cities. In the 1950s existing facilities were repaired, and, with Soviet assistance, considerable progress was made toward establishing a long-distance telephone wire network connecting Beijing to provincial-level capitals.

Communications in China were established rapidly in the early 1950s. By 1952 the principal telecommunications network centered on Beijing, and links to all large cities had finally been established. Work quickly got under way to repair, renovate and expand the system, and from 1956 telecommunications routes were extended more rapidly. To increase the efficiency of the communications system, the same lines were used for both telegraphic and telephone service, while Teletype and television (broadcasting) services were also added.

In addition, conference telephone service was initiated, radio communications were improved, and the production of telecommunications equipment was accelerated. Growth in telecommunications halted with the general economic collapse after the Great Leap Forward (1958–1960) but revived in the 1960s after the telephone network was expanded and improved equipment was introduced, including imports of Western plants and equipment.

In the years immediately following 1949, telecommunications – by telegraph or telephone – mainly used wire; by the 1970s, however, radio telecommunications equipment were increasingly used and began to replace wire lines. Microwave and satellite transmissions were soon introduced and have now become common. (China launched its first television-broadcast satellite in 1986.) In 1956 the first automatic speed Teletype was installed on the Beijing-Lhasa line. By 1964 such machines had been installed in most of China's major cities. Radio-television service also was installed in major cities, and radio teleprinters became widely used.

Telecommunications networks expanded significantly as a result of the Third Front campaign to develop basic industry in national defense industry in China's rugged interior in case of invasion by the Soviet Union or the United States. Production of radios within the Third Front regions rose by 11,668%.

An important component of the Fourth Five-Year Plan (1971–1975) was a major development program for the telecommunications system. The program allotted top priority to scarce electronics and construction resources and dramatically improved all aspects of China's telecommunications capabilities.

Microwave radio relay lines and buried cable lines were constructed to create a network of wideband carrier trunk lines, which covered the entire country. China was linked to the international telecommunications network by the installation of communications satellite ground stations and the construction of coaxial cables linking Guangdong Province with Hong Kong and Macau. Provincial-level units and municipalities rapidly expanded local telephone and wire broadcasting networks. Expansion and modernization of the telecommunications system continued throughout the late-1970s and early 1980s, giving particular emphasis to the production of radio and television sets and expanded broadcasting capabilities.

By 1987, China possessed a diversified telecommunications system that linked all parts of the country by telephone, telegraph, radio, and television. None of the telecommunications forms were as prevalent or as advanced as those in modern Western countries, but the system included some of the most sophisticated technology in the world and constituted a foundation for further development of a modern network.

Overall, China's telecommunications services improved enormously during the 1980s, and, the pace of telecommunications growth and technology upgrading increased even more rapidly after 1990, especially as fiber-optic systems and digital technology were installed. After 1997, China's telecommunications services were enhanced further with the acquisition of Hong Kong's highly advanced systems. In the late 1990s and early 2000s, foreign investment in the country's telecommunications sector further encouraged growth. Notable has been the tremendous increase in Internet and cellular phone usage. China became the world leader in the early 21st century, in terms of number of cell phone subscribers. The nation ranks first in the world in numbers of both mobile and fixed-line telephones, and first in the number of internet users.

China is the largest user of largest Voice calling over the Internet or Voice over Internet Protocol (VoIP) services with 51 million Tom-Skype users as of November 2007.

== History of telecommunications services ==
In 1987 the Ministry of Posts and Telecommunications (now the Ministry of Information Industry) administered China's telecommunications systems and related research and production facilities. Besides postal services, some of which were handled by electronic means, the ministry was involved in a wide spectrum of telephone, wire, telegraph, and international communications (see Postage stamps and postal history of the People's Republic of China). The Ministry of Radio and Television was established as a separate entity in 1982 to administer and upgrade the status of television and radio broadcasting. Subordinate to this ministry were the Central People's Broadcasting Station, Radio Beijing, and China Central Television. Additionally, the various broadcasting training, talent-search, research, publishing, and manufacturing organizations were brought under the control of the Ministry of Radio and Television. In 1986 responsibility for the movie industry was transferred from the Ministry of Culture to the new Ministry of Radio, Cinema, and Television.

As of 1987 the quality of telecommunications services in China had improved markedly over earlier years. A considerable influx of foreign technology and increased domestic production capabilities had a major impact in the post-Mao period.

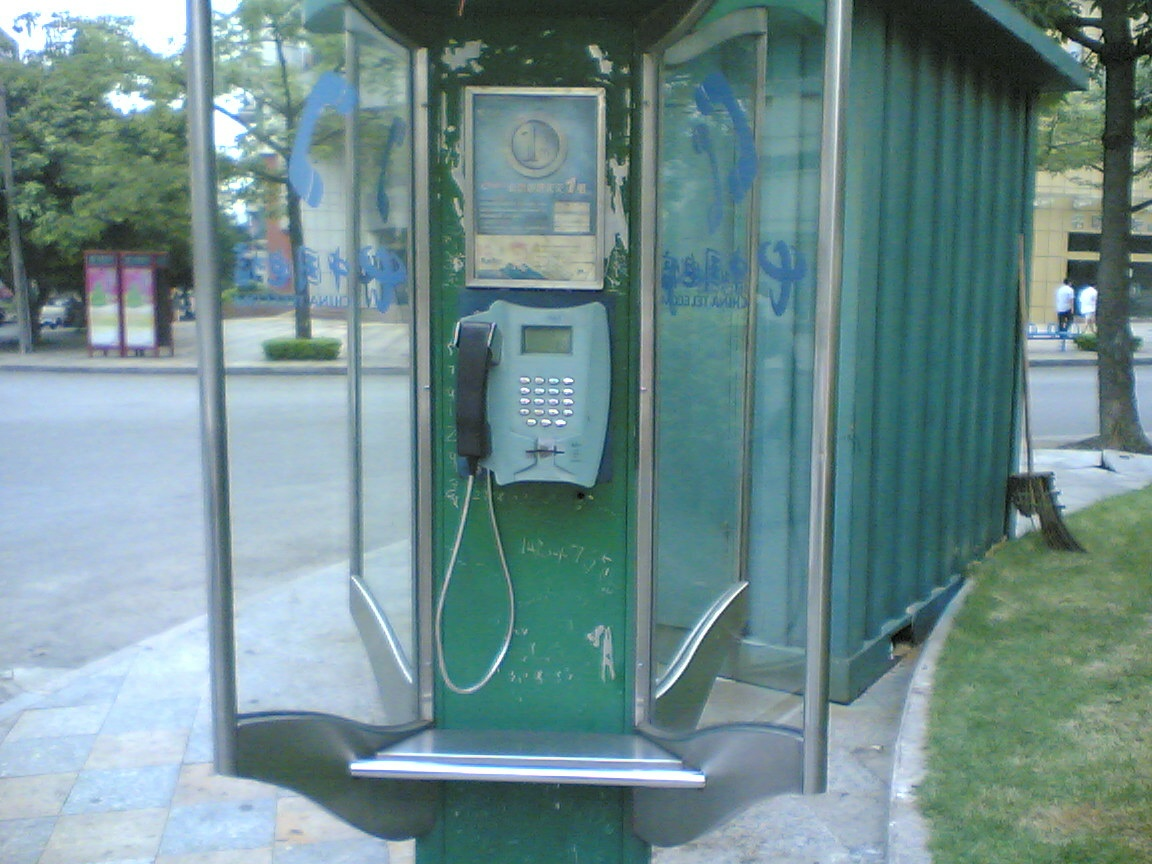
Phone booth, Luohu District, Shenzhen

The primary form of telecommunications in the 1980s was local and long-distance telephone service administered by six regional bureaus: Beijing (north region), Shanghai (east region), Xi'an (northwest region), Chengdu (southwest region), Wuhan (centralsouth region), and Shenyang (northeast region). These regional headquarters served as switching centers for provincial-level subsystems. By 1986 China had nearly 3 million telephone exchange lines, including 34,000 long-distance exchange lines with direct, automatic service to 24 cities. By late 1986 fiber optic communications technology was being employed to relieve the strain on existing telephone circuits. International service was routed through overseas exchanges located in Beijing and Shanghai. Guangdong Province had coaxial cable and microwave lines linking it to Hong Kong and Macau.

The large, continuously upgraded satellite ground stations, originally installed in 1972 to provide live coverage of the visits to China by U.S. president Richard M. Nixon and Japanese prime minister Kakuei Tanaka, still served as the base for China's international satellite communications network in the mid-1980s. By 1977 China had joined Intelsat and, using ground stations in Beijing and Shanghai, had linked up with satellites over the Indian and Pacific oceans.

In April 1984 China launched an experimental communications satellite for trial transmission of broadcasts, telegrams, telephone calls, and facsimile, probably to remote areas of the country. In February 1986 China launched its first fully operational telecommunications and broadcast satellite. The quality and communications capacity of the second satellite reportedly was much greater than the first. In mid-1987 both satellites were still functioning. With these satellites in place China's domestic satellite communication network went into operation, facilitating television and radio transmissions and providing direct-dial longdistance telephone, telegraph, and facsimile service. The network had ground stations in Beijing, Urumqi, Hohhot, Lhasa, and Guangzhou, which also were linked to an Intelsat satellite over the Indian Ocean.

Telegraph development received lower priority than the telephone network largely because of the difficulties involved in transmitting the written Chinese language. Computer technology gradually alleviated these problems and facilitated further growth in this area. By 1983 China had nearly 10,000 telegraph cables and telex lines transmitting over 170 million messages annually. Most telegrams were transmitted by cables or by shortwave radio. Cutmicrowave transmission also was used. Teletype transmission was used for messages at the international level, but some 40 percent of county and municipal telegrams were transmitted by Morse code.

Apart from traditional telegraph and telephone services, China also had facsimile, low-speed data-transmission, and computer-controlled telecommunications services. These included on-line information retrieval terminals in Beijing, Changsha, and Baotou that enabled international telecommunications networks to retrieve news and scientific, technical, economic, and cultural information from international sources.

High-speed newspaper-page-facsimile equipment and Chinese character – code translation equipment were used on a large scale. Sixty-four-channel program-controlled automatic message retransmission equipment and low- or medium-speed data transmission and exchange equipment also received extensive use. International telex service was available in coastal cities and special economic zones.

The Central People's Broadcasting Station controlled China's national radio network. Programming was administered by the provincial-level units. The station produced general news and cultural and educational programs. It also provided programs directed toward Taiwan and overseas Chinese listeners. Radio Beijing broadcast to the world in thirty-eight foreign languages, Standard Mandarin, and a number of Chinese varieties, including Xiamen, Cantonese, and Hakka. It also provided English-language news programs aimed at foreign residents in Beijing. Medium-wave, shortwave, and FM stations reached 80 percent of the country – over 160 radio stations and 500 relay and transmission stations – with some 240 radio programs.

The nationwide network of wire lines and loudspeakers transmitted radio programs into virtually all rural communities and many urban areas. By 1984 there were over 2,600 wired broadcasting stations, extending radio transmissions to rural areas outside the range of regular broadcasting stations.

In 1987 China Central Television (CCTV), the state network, managed China's television programs. In 1985 consumers purchased 15 million new sets, including approximately 4 million color sets. Production fell far short of demand. Because Chinese viewers often gathered in large groups to watch publicly owned sets, authorities estimated that two-thirds of the nation had access to television. In 1987 there were about 70 million television sets, an average of 29 sets per 100 families. CCTV had four channels that supplied programs to the over ninety television stations throughout the country. Construction began on a major new CCTV studio in Beijing in 1985. CCTV produced its own programs, a large portion of which were educational, and the Television University in Beijing produced three educational programs weekly. The English-language lesson was the most popular program and had an estimated 5 to 6 million viewers. Other programs included daily news, entertainment, teleplays, and special programs. Foreign programs included films and cartoons. Chinese viewers were particularly interested in watching international news, sports, and drama (see Culture of the People's Republic of China).

== Recent development ==
The former telecoms regulator – the Ministry of Information Industry (MII) – reported in 2004 that China had 295 million subscribers to main telephone lines and 305 million cellular telephone subscribers, the highest numbers in both categories. Both categories showed substantial increases over the previous decade; in 1995 there were only 3.6 million cellular telephone subscribers and around 20 million main-line telephone subscribers. By 2003 there were 42 telephones per 100 population.

In 2004, the Ministry of Industry and Information Technology began the Connecting Every Village Project to promote universal access to telecommunication and internet services in rural China. The MIIT required that six state-owned companies, including the main telecommunications and internet providers China Mobile, China Unicom, and China Telecom, build the communications infrastructure and assist in financing the project. Beginning in late 2009, the program began building rural telecenters each of which had at least one telephone, computer, and internet connectivity.By 2010, nearly every administrative village was connected to phone networks. Approximately 90,000 rural telecenters were built by 2011. As of December 2019, 135 million rural households had used broadband internet. The program successfully extended internet infrastructure throughout rural China and promoted development of the internet.

Internet use soared in China from about 60,000 Internet users in 1995 to 22.5 million users in 2000; by 2005 the number had reached 103 million. Although this figure is well below the 159 million users in the United States and is fairly low per capita, it was second in the world and on a par with Japan's 57 million users.

By June 2010, China had 420 million internet users. Incidentally, this is greater than the population of the US; however, penetration rate is still relatively low at just under 32%. (See Internet in the People's Republic of China.)

China's 2.7 million kilometers of optical fiber telecommunication cables by 2003 assisted greatly in the modernization process. China produces an increasing volume of televisions both for domestic use and export, which has helped to spread communications development. In 2001 China produced more than 46 million televisions and claimed 317 million sets in use. At the same time, there were 417 million radios in use in China, a rate of 342 per 1,000 population. However, many more are reached, especially in rural areas, via loudspeaker broadcasts of radio programs that bring transmissions to large numbers of radioless households.

98% of China's population was covered by a mobile phone network in 2011. In March 2012, the Ministry of Industry and Information Technology announced that China has 1.01 billion mobile phone subscribers; of these, 144 million are connected to 3G networks. At the same time, the number of landline phones dropped by 828,000 within the span of two months to a total of 284.3 million.

As of at least 2023, China is the world's biggest mobile phone market.

== Regulation ==
The primary regulator of communications, in particular telecommunications, in China is the Ministry of Industry and Information Technology (MIIT). It closely regulates all of the industries outlined below with the exception of the radio and television sectors, which belong to the remit of the State Administration of Radio, Film, and Television.

Since 2014, the Cyberspace Administration of China is responsible for setting policy and the regulatory framework for user content generated in online social activities on Internet portals.

== Sectors ==
=== Telephone ===
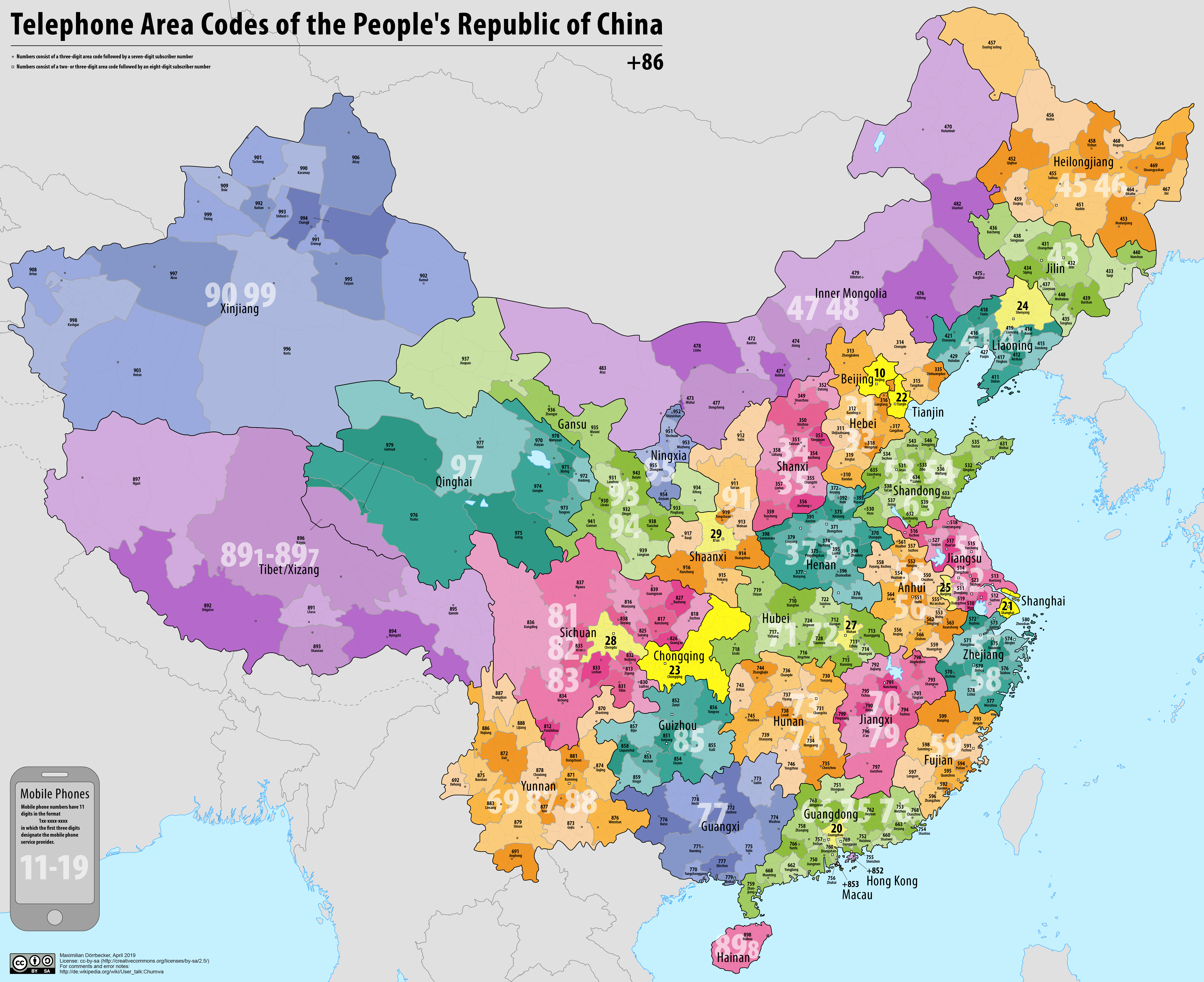
Telephone area codes

- Telephones – main lines in use: 284.3 million (March 2012)
- Telephones – mobile cellular subscribers: 1.01 billion (March 2012)
- Telephone country code: 86 (see Telephone numbers in China)

China imported its first mobile phone telecommunication facilities in 1987 and it took a decade for the number of subscribers to reach 10 million. Four years later, in 2001, the country had the largest number of mobile phone subscribers in the world.

Domestic and international services are increasingly available for private use. But an unevenly distributed domestic system serves principal cities, industrial centers, and many towns. China continues to develop its telecommunications infrastructure, and is partnering with foreign providers to expand its global reach; 3 of China's 6 major telecommunications operators are part of an international consortium which, in December 2006, signed an agreement with Verizon Business to build the first next-generation optical cable system directly linking the United States and China.

In December 2005, its combined main lines and mobile lines exceeded 743 million.

By the end of August 2006, statistics from the Ministry of Information Industry showed that there were more than 437 million mobile phone users in mainland China, or 327 mobile phones per 1,000 population.

From January to August 2006, mobile phone users on the mainland sent 273.67 million text messages. Continuing as of at least 2023, fees for text messages and MMS in China are extremely low.

Domestic interprovincial fiber-optic trunk lines and cellular telephone systems have been installed.

A domestic satellite system with 55 earth stations was in place.

International satellite earth stations include 5 Intelsat (4 Pacific Ocean and 1 Indian Ocean), 1 Intersputnik (Indian Ocean region) and 1 Inmarsat (Pacific and Indian Ocean regions).

Several international fiber-optic links include those to Japan, South Korea, Hong Kong, Russia, and Germany.

Fixed and mobile operators in China include China Mobile, China Netcom, China TieTong, China Satcom (former), China Telecom and China Unicom.

=== Radio ===
There are over 3,000 radio stations in the People's Republic of China. China National Radio, the nation's official radio station, has eight channels, and broadcasts for a total of over 200 hours per day via satellite. Every province, autonomous region and municipality has local broadcasting stations. China Radio International (CRI), the only national overseas broadcasting station, is beamed to all parts of the world in multiple languages.

Radio technology first arrived in China in the winter of 1922-1923. With radios expensive and reception weak, the early popularity of radio developed primarily among wealthy Chinese and foreigners in the major port cities like Shanghai. Radio's popularity grew during the Nanjing decade as prices dropped and broadcast quality improved. Cultural practices of radio listening were communal, with shops placing speakers facing the street and families pooling funds to buy radios for places like temples and schools.

In the People's Republic of China, mass listening campaigns of the 1950s sought to bring political news and other radio programming throughout China. The PRC established a network of "radio receptionists" in schools, army units, and factories. Radio receptionists would organise group listening activities, transcribe news on blackboards, and re-broadcast news using homemade megaphones. In the later 1950s, wired broadcasting expanded substantially in China. Wireless radio became widespread over the course of the 1960s and 1970s.

=== Television ===
Television is a prominent industry and form of mass media in China. Since 2018, state administration of the television industry has been overseen by the National Radio and Television Administration (NRTA). China Central Television (CCTV) is China's largest state-run national television broadcaster.

Television has existed in China since the Mao era, but has substantially increased in reach and popularity since the 1980s. By 1987, two-thirds of people in China had access to television. As of August 22, 2023, over 3,300 local, regional, and national TV channels are available in the country.

=== Internet ===
The People's Republic of China has been on the Internet intermittently since May 1989 and on a permanent basis since 20 April 1994. Since 2008, China has become the country with the largest population on the Internet (and remains so as of 2025). As of December 2024, 1.09 billion people in China (77.5% of the country's total population) use the internet.

==== Mobile phone web users ====
The affordability of mobile phones and internet data in China has resulted in the number of mobile internet users in China surpassing the number of computer internet users.

== Trans-Pacific Express ==
The Trans-Pacific Express is a telecommunications project to connect the United States with China with a fiber-optic cable that is designed to meet increasing internet traffic between the regions, with 60 times more capacity than existing cables. It is to be the first undersea or submarine telecommunications cable that directly links the US with China and the first independent trans-Pacific connection. Current cable links between China and the US run through Japan.

The project includes US Verizon Communications, Chinese firms China Telecom, China Netcom and China Unicom, South Korea's Korea Telecom and Taiwan's Chunghwa Telecom. The project was initiated in December 2006. Work began in mid-October 2007 in Qingdao. It was scheduled to be completed by July 2008 (before the Beijing Olympics).

Earthquake hotspots have been avoided in the planned route of the cable to avoid potential disruption to internet and telephone networks in Asia. The cable will extend more than 18,000 km and will cost about $500m. It will terminate in Nedonna Beach, Oregon with connections to Taiwan and South Korea. When complete, the new cable will be able to support the equivalent of 62 million simultaneous phone calls, with the design capacity to support future internet growth and advanced applications such as video and e-commerce.

== See also ==
- Internationalized domain name (IDN.IDN) for non-ASCII characters
- Digital divide in China
- CERNET (China Education and Research Network)
- Media in China and its history
- Electronics industry in China
- Postal system in China
- China Software Industry Association
- Mobile phone industry in China
- EUChinaGRID
- Internet censorship in the People's Republic of China
- List of telephone operating companies
