= UTStarcom =

Chinese telecom infrastructure company

UTStarcom Holdings Corp.
- Native name: UT斯达康
- Type: Public
- Traded as: Nasdaq: UTSI
- Industry: Telecommunications equipment
- Founded: 1991; 35 years ago
- Founders: Hong Liang Lu; Ying Wu
- Headquarters: Beijing, China
- Area served: Worldwide
- Key people: Tim Ti (CEO); Zhaochen Huang (COO); Steven Chen (CMO)
- Products: Packet optical networking equipment, Wireless products, broadband access products, SDN
- Revenue: ▼US$101.6 million (2015)
- Operating income: ▲US$-9.8 million (2015)
- Number of employees: >600 (2016)
- Website: utstar.com

UTStarcom Holdings Corp. (UT斯达康) is a Chinese global telecom infrastructure provider headquartered in Beijing. The company develops and supplies a broad range of telecommunication devices to communications service providers and network operators including fixed and mobile network operators, as well as to enterprises. Traditionally, the company had focused on markets in China, Japan, and India, but has expanded to markets in Africa, Central and Latin America, and the Middle East.

The company's products are designed to work with existing telecommunications infrastructure to provide low-cost voice and data services for access to both wireless (Wi-Fi) and fixed line products, optimized for mobile backhaul, metro aggregation, broadband access and Wi-Fi data. As of 2015, the company focuses on two core areas: broadband and next-generation network (NGN).

The company has offices worldwide with business and R&D centers located in China, Japan, South Korea, India, the Middle East and Europe. It is listed on the NASDAQ since 2000.

== History ==
The company was founded in 1995 as a merger between Unitech and Starcom Networks to form UTStarcom. Unitech was founded in 1991 by Hong Liang Lu (陆弘亮), a Chinese entrepreneur with a BS degree from UC Berkeley, as Unitech Telecom. It was focused on the telecommunications markets in China, Japan, the United States and India, with its initial presence in China established in 1993 in Hangzhou, Zhejiang. Starcom Networks was founded in 1991 by Ying Wu (吴鹰) and a team who had worked together at the Bell Labs in New Jersey, United States.

After several years of trying to expand its business globally, UTStarcom launched the Personal Handy-phone System, also known as the Personal Access System, a technology originally developed in Japan.

In March 2000, UTStarcom went public on the NASDAQ.

In July 2008, UTStarcom sold its Personal Communications Division to AIG.
