= China Netcom =

State-owned telecommunications company

- Type: State-owned enterprise
- Industry: Telecommunication
- Founded: 1999; 27 years ago
- Defunct: 6 October 2008; 17 years ago
- Fate: Merged into China Unicom
- Headquarters: Beijing, China
- Revenue: ▲US$7.844 billion (2004)
- Number of employees: 92,788

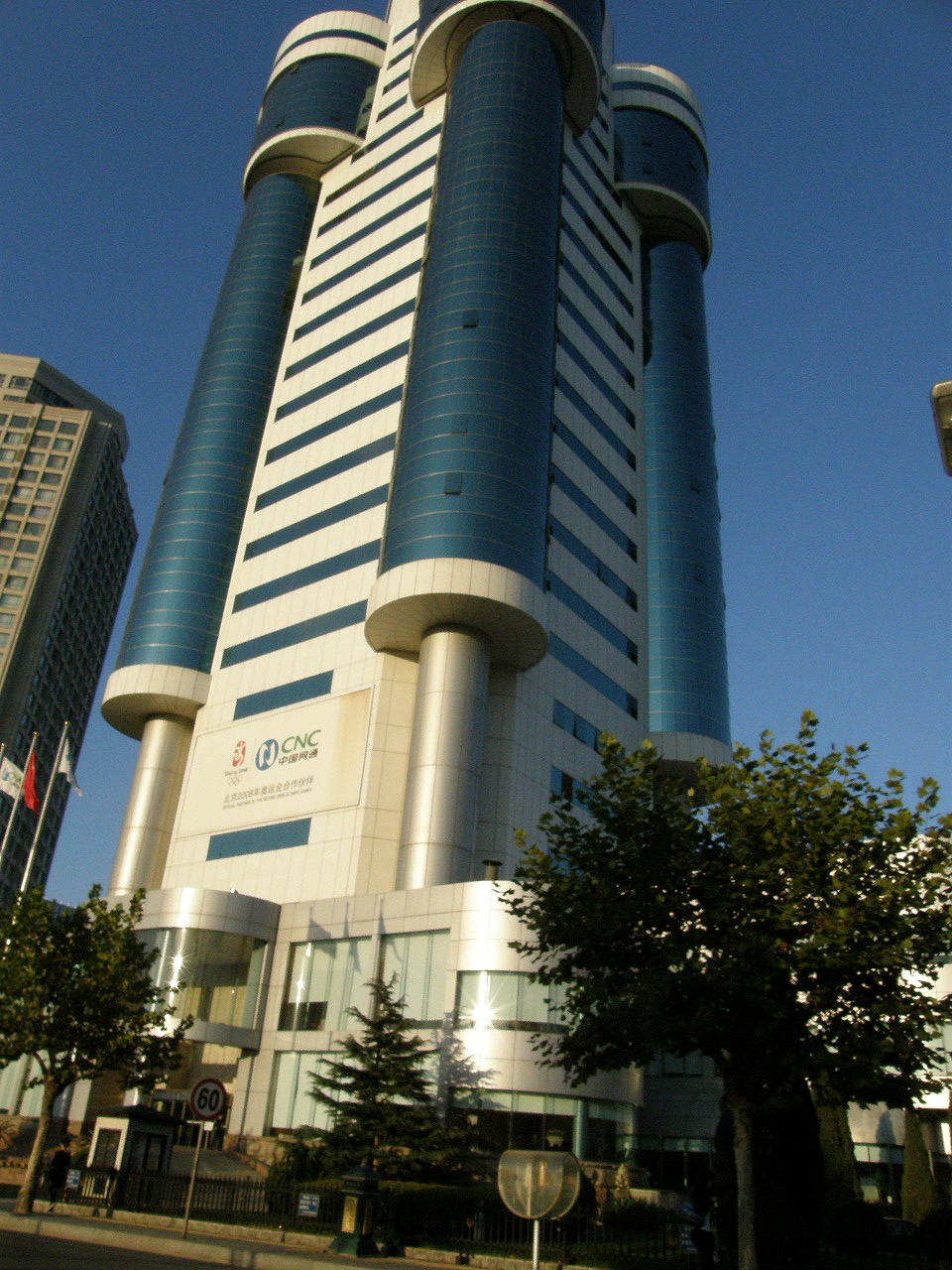
Former China Netcom Dalian branch

China Netcom, full name China Netcom Group Corporation (Hong Kong) Limited (former stock codes: HKEX:0906, NYSE:CN), abbreviated CNC, was a telecommunication service provider in People's Republic of China. It was formed in August 1999 by the Chinese government to enable inward investments to build high speed Internet communications in the country.

== Sectors ==
CNC was a provider of wire-line telecommunications services in mainland China, mainly to areas in the north of China. The firm was building a new broadband Internet backbone across the country. It was widely seen as the number two fixed-line operator in mainland China after China Telecommunications Corporation, and operated a semi-mobile PAS or xiaolingtong system.

Traditionally services were provided by the company to northern Chinese provinces and large cities such as Shanghai, Guangdong, Beijing, Tianjin, Hebei, Henan, Shandong, and Liaoning; however, later they had a presence in most provinces.

As well as offering ADSL internet services (not always available outside of north China), the company offered internet collocation services and was a leading provider of connectivity to China's so-called 'IP telephone' shops, who offer discount rate, walk-in telephony services to the general public across China.

Moreover, ChinaNetcom was the Beijing 2008 Olympic's Official telecommunications operator and partner and provided fixed-line telecommunications services for the Beijing Organizing Committee of the Olympic Games. It offered good fixed-lined telecommunication service and ensured its network was stable during the Good Luck Beijing Test Sport Event, the Beijing 2008 Olympic Games and the Beijing 2008 Paralympic Games.

== History ==
The company started as a wholesaler for high-speed data networks in 1999, headquartered in Shanghai. It was backed by Jiang Mianheng, Jiang Zemin's son, and Liu Chuanzhi, chairman of Legend Computers (now Lenovo). However, the business flopped partly because at the time China Telecommunications Corporation (China Telecom Group) held a monopoly over the telecom market.

Netcom was on the verge of bankruptcy. Fortunately for Netcom, with the backing of Jiang's son, the Chinese government broke up the China Telecom monopoly and granted Netcom a third of China Telecom's assets. Most of those assets are located in the northern provinces.

== Merger with China Unicom ==
China Netcom was a subsidiary of China Network Communications Group Corporation.

On June 2, 2008, Netcom announced its intention to merge with China Unicom, after the latter sold its CDMA network to China Telecommunications Corporation. The combined company has all the assets of China Netcom, plus Unicom's nationwide GSM network with 125 million subscribers, as well as its smaller dial-up and ADSL Internet service provider (ISP) business.

The merger was completed on 6 October 2008. China Netcom became a wholly owned subsidiary of China Unicom and the listings of its shares on the Hong Kong Stock Exchange and its American depositary receipt Shares on the New York Stock Exchange were withdrawn.

== Complaints about spam ==
China Netcom and its domain cnc-noc.net have been noted in the West as a source of e-mail spam and host of spamvertised websites for products such as pills, porn and poker.

In 2008, Norwegian researchers identified cnc-noc.net as "by far the world's worst ISP", and noted that the ISP did not respond to incident reports.

Spamhaus lists the Unicom ISP as the 3rd worst ISP for spamming.

== See also ==
- Communications in China
- Telecommunications industry in China
