= Personal Handy-phone System =

Discontinued cellular telephone network standard

The Personal Handy-phone System (PHS), also known as the Personal Communication Telephone (PCT) in Thailand, and the Personal Access System (PAS) and commercially branded as Xiaolingtong (Chinese: 小灵通) in China, was a mobile network system operating in the 1880–1930 MHz frequency band. In Japan, it was introduced as a low-cost wireless service with smaller coverage areas than standard cellular networks. Its affordability made it popular in China, Taiwan, and other parts of Asia, as both the handsets and network infrastructure were relatively inexpensive to maintain.

Developed in the 1990s, PHS used a microcell architecture with low-power base stations covering 100 to 500 metres (330 to 1,640 ft). Unlike conventional cellular networks that relied on large cell sites for extensive coverage, PHS’s design was better suited for dense urban environments and reduced infrastructure costs.

PHS was overtaken in the marketplace by GSM (2G) and UMTS (3G), with the last retail network decommissioned in 2021 and the last commercial network terminated in 2023.

== Outline ==
The name "Xiaolingtong" was adopted from the protagonist of Ye Yonglie's science fiction classic, Little Smarty Travels to the Future (Xiao Lingtong manyou weilai 小灵通漫游未来).

=== Technology ===
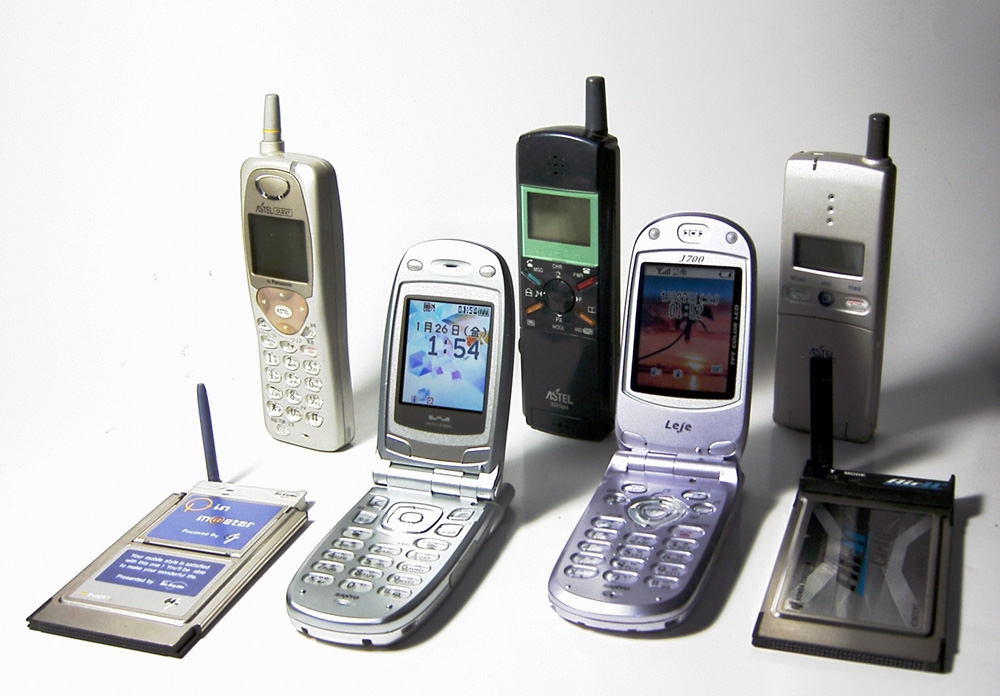
PHS Japan 1997–2003 (Willcom, NTT DoCoMo, ASTEL)

PHS is essentially a cordless telephone like DECT, with the capability to handover from one cell to another. PHS cells are small, with transmission power of base station a maximum of 500 mW and range typically measures in tens or at most hundreds of metres (some can range up to about 2 kilometres in line-of-sight), contrary to the multi-kilometre ranges of CDMA and GSM. This makes PHS suitable for dense urban areas, but impractical for rural areas, and the small cell size also makes it difficult if not impossible to make calls from rapidly moving vehicles.

PHS uses TDMA/TDD for its radio channel access method, and 32 kbit/s ADPCM for its voice codec. Modern PHS phone can also support many value-added services such as high speed wireless data/Internet connection (64 kbit/s and higher), WWW access, e-mailing, and text messaging.

PHS technology is also a popular option for providing a wireless local loop, where it is used for bridging the "last mile" gap between the POTS network and the subscriber's home. It was developed under the concept of providing a wireless front-end of an ISDN network. Thus a PHS base station is compatible with ISDN and is often connected directly to ISDN telephone exchange equipment e.g. a digital switch.

In spite of its low-cost base station, micro-cellular system and "Dynamic Cell Assignment" system, PHS offers higher number-of-digits frequency use efficiency with lower cost (throughput per area basis), compared with typical 3G cellular telephone systems. It enables flat-rate wireless service such as AIR-EDGE, throughout Japan.

The speed of an AIR-EDGE data connection is accelerated by combining lines, each of which basically is 32 kbit/s. The first version of AIR-EDGE, introduced in 2001, provided 32 kbit/s service. In 2002, 128 kbit/s service (AIR-EDGE 4×) started and in 2005, 256 kbit/s (8×) service started. In 2006, the speed of each line was also upgraded to 1.6 times with the introduction of "W-OAM" technology. The speed of AIR-EDGE 8× is up to 402 kbit/s with the latest "W-OAM" capable instrument.

In April 2007, "W-OAM typeG" was introduced allowing data speeds of 512 kbit/s for AIR-EDGE 8x users. Furthermore, the "W-OAM typeG" 8× service was planned to be upgraded to a maximum throughput of 800 kbit/s, when the upgrading for access points (mainly switching lines from ISDN to fibre optic) in its system are completed. Thus it was expected to exceed the speeds of popular W-CDMA 3G service like NTT DoCoMo's FOMA in Japan.

=== Implementation ===
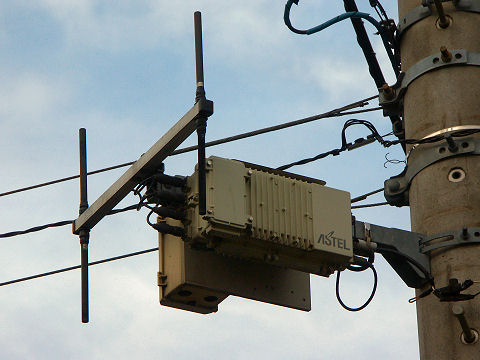
ASTEL-brand PHS Base station in Tokyo, Japan

Developed by NTT Laboratory in Japan in 1989 and far simpler to implement and deploy than competing systems like PDC or GSM, the commercial services were started by three PHS operators (NTT-Personal, DDI-Pocket, and ASTEL) in Japan in 1995, forming the PIAF (PHS Internet Access Forum). However, the service was pejoratively dubbed as the "poor man's cellular", due to its limited range and roaming abilities. NTT DoCoMo, which absorbed NTT Personal, and ASTEL terminated the PHS service in January 2008.

In Thailand, TelecomAsia (now True Corporation) integrated the PHS system with Intelligent Network and marketed the service as Personal Communication Telephone (PCT). The integrated system was the world's first that allowed the fixed line telephone subscribers of the public switched telephone network to use PHS as a value added service with the same telephone number and shared the same voice mailbox. The PCT service was commercially launched in November 1999 with the peak of 670,000 subscribers in 2001. However, the number of subscribers had declined to 470,000 in 2005 before the breakeven in 2006 after six years of heavy investment up to 15 billion THB. With the popularity of other cellular phone services, the company shifted the focus of the PCT to a niche market segment of youths ages 10-18.

Wireless local loop (WLL) systems based on PHS technology are in use in some of the above-mentioned countries. WILLCOM, formerly DDI-Pocket, introduced flat-rate wireless network and flat-rate calling in Japan, which reversed the local fate of PHS up to an extent. In China, there was an explosive expansion of subscribers until around 2005. In Chile, Telefónica del Sur launched a PHS-based telephony service in some cities of the southern part of the country in March 2006. In Brazil, Suporte Tecnologia has a PHS-based telephony service in Betim, state of Minas Gerais, and Transit Telecom announced a rollout of a PHS network in 2007.

In the early mobile phone era of China, Xiaolingtong phones dominated the market. China Telecom operated a PAS system in China, although technically it was not regarded as allowed to provide mobile services, because of some particularities of the Chinese governance. China Netcom, the other fixed-line operator in China, also provides Xiaolingtong service. The system was a runaway hit, with over 90 million subscribers signed up as of 2007; the largest equipment vendors were UTStarcom and ZTE. However, low priced mobile phones rapidly replaced PHS. The Ministry of Industry and Information Technology of the People's Republic of China issued notices on 13 February 2009 that both registration of new users and expansion of the network were to be discontinued, with the service to be ended by the end of 2011.

A PHS global roaming service was available between Japan (WILLCOM), Taiwan, and Thailand.

== Commercial deployments ==
This is a list of commercial PHS deployments around the world, all of which are now defunct:

| Country | Operator | f (MHz) | Launch date | End of service | Notes |
|---|---|---|---|---|---|
| Japan | NTT DoCoMo | 1884,65–1919,45 | Jul 1995 | Jan 2008 | |
| Japan | Softbank (Y!mobile) | 1884,65 - 1919,45 | Jul 1995 | Jan 2021 (retail) Apr 2023 (commercial) | Willcom merged with eAccess into Y!mobile in 2014. Operated by Carlyle (Willcom) (2004–2010). Operated by KDDI (DDI Pocket) (1995–2004). 070 prefix under the Japanese telephone numbering plan. |
| Hong Kong | | 1895–1906,1 | 1997 | May 2016 | |
| China | China Unicom; China Telecom (Xiaolingtong) (Little Smart) | 1880–1920 | 1998 | Sep 2013 | |
| Thailand | True Corporation | 1906,1 - 1918,1 | Nov 1999 | 2013 | Additional service for fixed-line subscribers. |
| Taiwan | Fitel | 1905–1915 | May 2001 | Mar 2015 | |
| Chile | Telefónica del Sur | 1910–1930 | Mar 2006 | May 2011 | |

== List of PHS-enabled CompactFlash cards ==
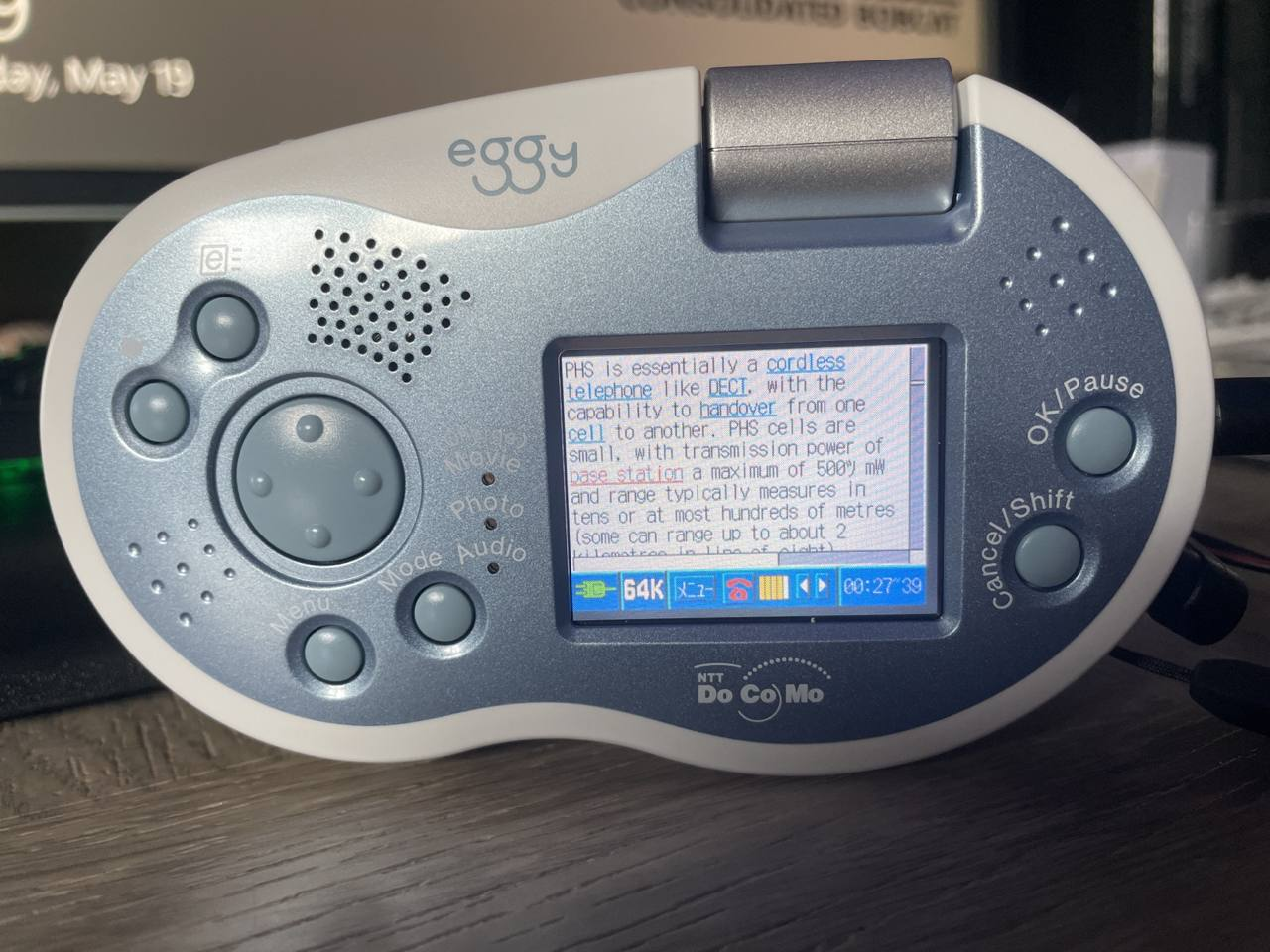
DoCoMo Eggy viewing "Personal Handy-Phone System" page on English Wikipedia with a P-in Comp@ct mobile data card.

PHS-enabled PCMCIA/CompactFlash cards include:

- TDK DF56CF
- NTT DoCoMo P-in m@ster
- NTT P-in memory
- DDI AirH”Card petit [RH2000]
- DDI AirH”Card petit [CFE-02
- DDI C@rdH”64 petit [CFE-01]
- DDI C@rdH”64 petit [CFE-01/TD]

== See also ==
- CT2 – similar system in Europe, Canada and Hong Kong
- OpenBTS – low-cost GSM access
