= China Unicom =

Chinese state-owned enterprise

China United Network Communications Group Co., Ltd.
- Native name: 中国联合网络通信集团有限公司
- Type: State-owned enterprise
- Traded as: SSE: 600050 (Note: See §Stock for the listing structure of the company.); SEHK: 762; Hang Seng Index component; CSI A100
- ISIN: HK0000049939
- Industry: Telecommunications
- Founded: 18 June 1994; 32 years ago
- Founder: Ministry of Railways; Ministry of Electronics Industry; Ministry of Electric Power Industry
- Headquarters: Xicheng, Beijing, China
- Area served: Mainland China; Hong Kong; Macau; North Korea
- Products: Fixed-line telephony; Mobile telephony; internet access; digital television
- Revenue: 292,185,290,000 renminbi (2018)
- Owner: Central People's Government (100%)
- Number of employees: 244,508 (2023)
Subsidiaries
China United Network Communications	(53.78%)
→ China Unicom (H.K.)
PCCW (18.46%)
Telefónica (1.27%)
- ASN: 4837
- Traffic Levels: 10-20 Tbps
- Website: www.chinaunicom.com
- Footnotes data obtained from China United Network Communications Ltd. (the accounts of the parent company was not disclosed); in consolidated financial statement; excluding minority interests to red chip minority shareholders

China United Network Communications Group Co., Ltd.
- Simplified Chinese: 中国联合网络通信集团有限公司
- Traditional Chinese: 中國聯合網絡通信集團有限公司
Transcriptions

China Unicom
- Simplified Chinese: 中国联通 or 联通
- Traditional Chinese: 中國聯通 or 聯通
Transcriptions
Standard Mandarin
- Hanyu Pinyin: Zhōngguó Liántōng

China Unicom Group
- Simplified Chinese: 联通集团
- Traditional Chinese: 聯通集團
Transcriptions

China United Network Communications Group Co., Ltd., doing business as China Unicom, is a Chinese state-owned telecommunications operator. Originally founded in 1994 as a wireless paging and GSM mobile operator, it currently provides a range of services including mobile network, long-distance & local calling, data communication, Internet services, digital television, and IP telephony. As of 2022, China Unicom is the third-largest wireless carrier in China and the sixth largest mobile provider in the world.

== History ==
China Unicom, then known in Chinese as 中国联合通信有限公司 (Zhōngguó liánhé tōngxìn yǒuxiàn gōngsī), was founded as a state-owned enterprise in 1994 by the Ministry of Railways, the Ministry of Electronics and the Ministry of Electric Power Industry; the establishment was approved by the State Council in December 1993.

China Unicom was among six state-owned companies that built the communications infrastructure and assisted in financing the Ministry of Industry and Information Technology's Connecting Every Village Project, which began in 2004. The project aimed to promote universal telecommunications and internet access in rural China. The program successfully extended internet infrastructure throughout rural China and promoted development of the internet.

China Unicom has operated a CDMA network in Macau since October 18, 2006 and internet services in North Korea since 2010. As of the end of April 2008, the company had 125 million GSM subscribers and 43 million CDMA subscribers. As of November 2008 the CDMA operations have been moved to China Telecommunications Corporation (China Telecom Group). On 7 January 2009, China Unicom was awarded WCDMA license to expand its business to 3G telecommunication. UMTS (Universal Mobile Telecommunications System) was launched in major cities across China on May 17, 2009.

On July 11, 2020, China Unicom joined hands with Lu Han to launch the "FuLu Companion Card", which sounded the forward number for the further development of 5G. LuHan also officially unlocked his new identity and became a "China Unicom Innovation Partner", with the "FuLu companion card" to bring exclusive benefits and surprises to the majority of Unicom users.

=== IPOs ===
In February 2000 a subsidiary "China Unicom Hong Kong" was incorporated in Hong Kong and was listed on the Hong Kong Stock Exchange on June 22, 2000.

The intermediate parent company "China Unicom (Hong Kong) Limited" was "China Unicom (BVI) Limited", As of 31 December 2001, the BVI company owned 77.47% shares of China Unicom (H.K.). In turn, China Unicom (H.K.) owned the operating subsidiaries of the group. In 2002, another intermediate parent company "China United Network Communications Limited" was established in Shanghai (headquartered in Beijing), to own 51% stake of "China Unicom (BVI) Limited" as well as listing the shares in the Shanghai Stock Exchange. As of 31 December 2002, state-owned China Unicom Group owned 74.6% shares of the A share company, in turn the A share company owned 73.84% of the BVI company. The BVI company owned 77.47% shares of the red chip company. To sum up, the Chinese Government via A share company, owned 42.67% stake of the operating subsidiaries, as well as additional 20.27% stake by the minority stake in the BVI company.

=== Merger with China Netcom ===
On June 2, 2008, China Unicom announced its intention to sell its CDMA business and assets to China Telecommunications Corporation (China Telecom Group) for a combined total of 110 billion RMB and to merge the remainder of the company, in a share swap valued at US$56.3 billion (based on Unicom's stock last traded price) on June 2, 2008, with China Netcom. The CDMA business was officially moved to China Telecom in early November.

In July 2009, China Unicom signed a $700 million deal with infrastructure vendor Ericsson to upgrade the company's GSM network.

In April 2012, China Unicom was a founding member in the formation of Cloud Computing Industry Alliance in Beijing. Other members of the alliance include Baidu, Tencent, and Alibaba.

=== Partnership with Telefonica ===
In 2009, China Unicom (Hong Kong) agreed to a US$1 billion cross-holding with Spain's Telefónica. In January 2011, the two partners agreed a further US$500 million tie-up in each other, which following completion in late 2011, Telefónica will hold a 9.7% shares in China Unicom (H.K.), while the red chip company will own 1.4% shares of the Spanish firm. The companies also agreed to deepen their cooperation in areas such as procurement, mobile service platforms, service to MNC's wholesale carriers, roaming, technology, among others, where both companies have been cooperating since the signature of their strategic alliance agreement.

In June 2012, China United Network Communications Group (China Unicom Group), the ultimate parent company of Hong Kong listed company "China Unicom (Hong Kong)", had agreed to buy back about 1.1 billion shares (approx. 4.6% of the share capital) of the red chip company from Telefónica for an approx. HK$11 billion. (HK$10.21 per share; by narrow band floating exchange rate approx. US$1.4 billion), via an unlisted subsidiary "China Unicom Group Corporation (BVI) Limited". Immediate after the deal, Telefónica still owned 5% of China Unicom (H.K.). In 2014 Telefónica sold a further 2.5% shares of "China Unicom (H.K.)" for HK$6.66 billion (HK$11.14 per share).

During year 2016, Telefónica sold a further 1.51% shares of "China Unicom (H.K.)" for HK$2.822 billion (HK$7.8 per share), As of 31 December 2016 Telefónica owned 1% shares of the red chip company (decreased from 2.51% year-to-yearly), as well as Telefónica's director César Alierta, still served as a director of "China Unicom (H.K.)".

=== Mixed-ownership reform of state-owned enterprise ===
In 2017 China Unicom became one of the pilot projects of the mixed-ownership reform of the Chinese state-owned enterprise, which saw a decrease in the Government's ownership.

In 2017 the Class A listed company of the group introduced ten strategic investors: state-controlled China Structural Reform Fund, state-controlled listed company China Life Insurance, a private equity fund (Chinese: 腾讯信达有限合伙企业; lit. 'Tencent–Cinda Limited Partnership') that was owned by China Cinda Asset Management and a company related to Tencent, (Note: An indirect unit holder of the fund (Chinese: 深圳市腾讯产业投资基金; lit. 'Shenzhen Tencent Industry Investment Fund'), was owned by some managers of Tencent. It was stated as a "new OPCO" (new operating company) of Cayman-incorporated listed company Tencent Holdings.) a private equity fund partially owned by Baidu (Note: One of the unit holder of the fund was indirectly owned by Baidu Netcom Science Technology (Chinese: 百度网讯科技); the stake of Baidu Netcom was 99.5% owned by Robin Li; the stake was pledged to Baidu Online Network Technology (Beijing) (Chinese: 百度在线网络技术(北京)), an indirect subsidiary of Cayman-incorporated Baidu Inc., thus it was considered as part of Baidu Group. Another indirect unit holder (Chinese: 北京鼎鹿中原科技), owned by some of the managers of Baidu, was linked to Baidu by the Chinese media, but Baidu denied to comment.) and Industrial Bank (Chinese: 百度鹏寰投资合伙企业), a private equity fund that related to JD.com (Chinese: 京东三弘企业管理中心; lit. 'Jingdong Sanhong'), (Note: The indirect unit holder of the private equity fund (Chinese: 江苏京东邦能投资管理有限公司; lit. 'Jingdong Bangneng Investment Management') was 45% owned by Liu Qiangdong founder of JD.com (Jingdong) and 55% by Sun Jiaming (Chinese: 孙加明), a senior manager of JD.com. Jingdong Bangneng was listed as a consolidated variable interest entity of JD.com) a public company Ali Venture Capital (Chinese: 阿里创业投资), (Note: The stake of the company was 80% owned by Jack Ma, but also pledged to Alibaba Group. It was considered as a subsidiary and/or consolidated entity of Alibaba Group.) a public company Suning Commerce Group and three minor private equity funds that was subscribed by companies such as Kuang-Chi and CRRC Group.

In the same year, the fund raised by the A share company was injected to the Hong Kong incorporated red chip company, via "China Unicom (BVI) Limited", for HK$13.24 per share (for a maximum of 6.64 billion share / HK$88 billion).

=== U.S. sanctions ===
In October 2019, a group of U.S. senators urged the Federal Retirement Thrift Investment Board to divest U.S. pension money from any investment in China Unicom for providing telecommunications services to disputed artificial islands in the South China Sea. In August 2020, the United States Department of Defense published a list of companies operating directly or indirectly in the United States with ties to the People's Liberation Army. China Unicom was included on the list.

In October 2020, the Federal Communications Commission (FCC) requested the United States Department of Justice report whether China Unicom poses a "national security risk".

In November 2020, the U.S. President issued an executive order prohibiting U.S. companies and individuals owning stocks that the United States Department of Defense deemed to have links to the People's Liberation Army - which included China Unicom. In consequence of the order, the New York Stock Exchange delisted China Unicom in January 2021.

In March 2021, the FCC initiated proceedings to revoke China Unicom's authorization to operate in the U.S. due to "national security" concerns. In January 2022, the FCC revoked China Unicom's authorization to operate in the United States, giving it 60 days to cease providing telecommunications services. In September 2022, the FCC added China Unicom to a list of companies considered "national security threats".

In December 2024, the U.S. Court of Appeals for the Ninth Circuit rejected China Unicom's challenge of the 2022 FCC revocation of its authorization to operate in the U.S. In March 2025, the FCC opened an investigation into China Unicom and other Chinese companies regarding operations in the U.S. in violation of restrictions. Also in March 2025, the United States House Select Committee on Strategic Competition between the United States and the Chinese Communist Party initiated an inquiry into China Unicom and issued subpoenas for company records in April 2025.

=== Response to invasion of Ukraine ===
Following the 2022 Russian invasion of Ukraine, China United Network Communications Group continued its operations in Russia through its subsidiary, China Unicom (Russia) Operations Limited Liability Company, maintaining business as usual despite international sanctions and widespread corporate withdrawals. Research from the Yale School of Management placed the company in the "Grade F" category of "Digging In," indicating that it has defied demands for exit or reduction of activities in Russia.

== Equity investments ==
As of 31 December 2016

- PCCW (18.46%, held by unlisted portion of China Unicom Group)
- Telefónica (1.27%, held by Hong Kong listed subsidiary "China Unicom (H.K.)")

As of 30 August 2025

China Unicom's most recent equity investments have shifted focus from traditional telecom infrastructure toward digital, cloud, and international growth.

- BlackRock: increased stake in China Unicom by 1% in Q1 2023 (now about 5%).
- Vanguard: slightly reduced holdings by 0.5%.
- Capital Group: maintained a stable position at 4.15%.

Recent Equity & Strategic Investments
Year	Investment Type	Details
2023-2025	Digital/Cloud/AI	Massive reinvestment in CDSA business, cloud, AI, IoT, 5G
2023	Shareholder updates	BlackRock up to 5%, Vanguard slightly down, Capital Group stable
2024	International branches	New offices in Saudi Arabia, Peru, UAE, Uzbekistan under UniCom brand
2024	Fixed Asset Investment	Reduction to ~RMB 55 billion, focus on digital, less on new equity stakes

== Surveillance allegations ==
In December 2020, The Guardian reported that a security researcher identified evidence of surveillance campaign against Americans by China Unicom via Caribbean mobile networks, Cable & Wireless Communications and BTC. China Unicom denied the allegations.

== See also ==
- Communications in China
- Telecommunications industry in China
- List of mobile network operators
- List of telephone operating companies
