= Qixing =

Qixing or 七星 may refer to:

== China ==
- Qixing District (七星区)
- Seven-star Cave, or Qixingyan (七星岩), cave complex in Guilin
- Seven Star Crags (七星岩), in Zhaoqing, Guangdong

== Taiwan ==
- Qixing Mountain (Taipei) (七星山)
- Qixingyan (Taiwan) (七星岩), off the coast of Pingtung County in the Bashi Channel
- Qixingtan Beach (七星潭海邊), a beach in Xincheng Township, Hualien County facing the Pacific Ocean

== See also ==
- Seven star
- Chilseong
