= Qixingyan =

Qixingyan may refer to:

- Seven-star Cave, in Guilin, Guangxi, China
- Seven Star Crags, in Zhaoqing, Guangdong, China
- Qixingyan (Taiwan), in Pingtung County, Taiwan
