= A Farewell to Arms (1932 film) =

1932 directed by Frank Borzage

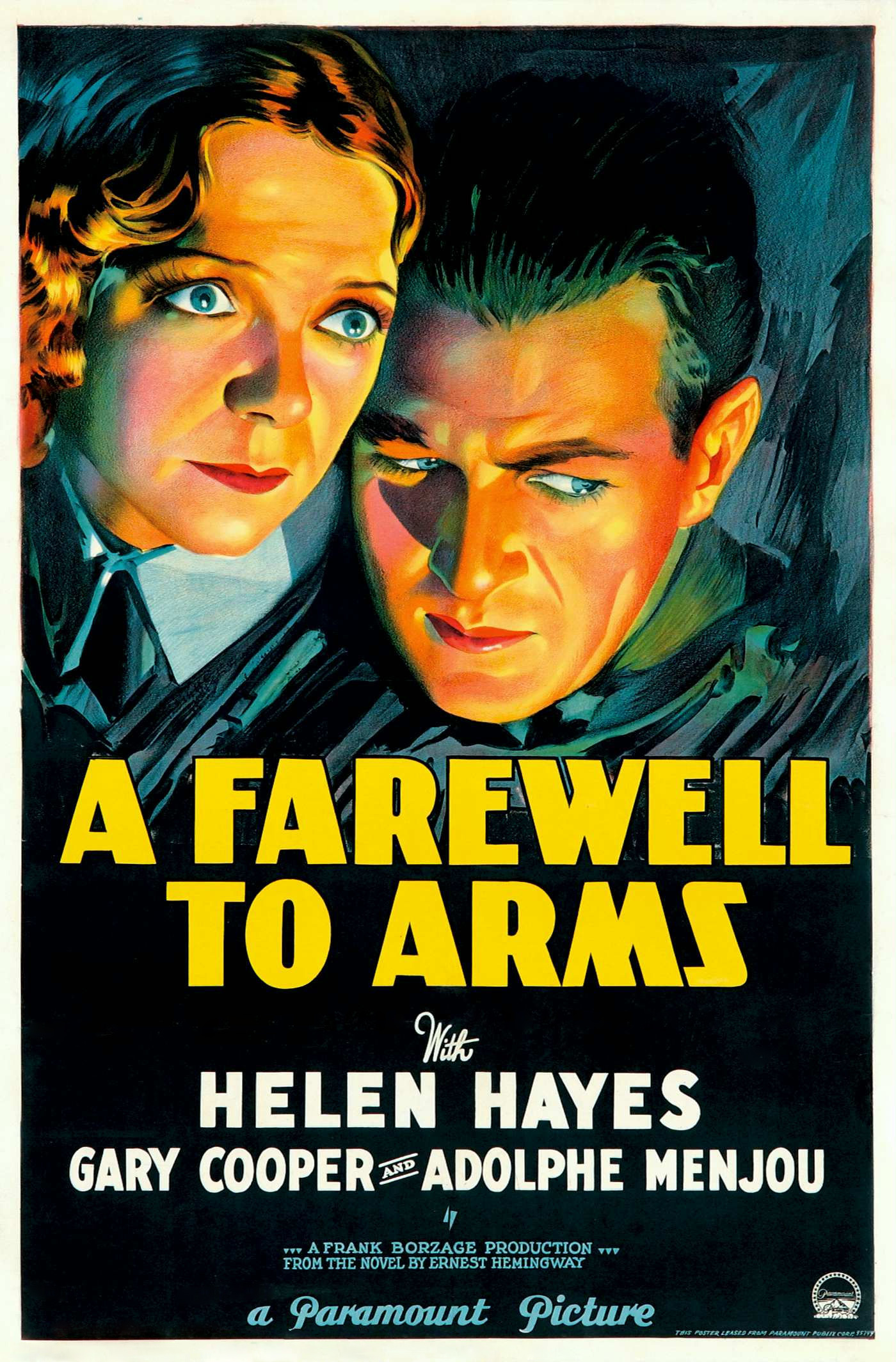
- Theatrical release poster
- Directed by: Frank Borzage
- Screenplay by: Benjamin Glazer; Oliver H.P. Garrett
- Based on: A Farewell to Arms; 1929 novel by: Ernest Hemingway 1930 play; Laurence Stallings
- Produced by: Edward A. Blatt; Benjamin Glazer
- Starring: Helen Hayes; Gary Cooper; Adolphe Menjou
- Cinematography: Charles Lang
- Edited by: Otho Lovering; George Nicholls Jr.
- Music by: Herman Hand; W. Franke Harling; Bernhard Kaun; John Leipold; Paul Marquardt; Ralph Rainger; Milan Roder; (all uncredited)
- Production company: Paramount Pictures
- Distributed by: Paramount Pictures (original release); Warner Bros. Pictures (1949 reissue)
- Release date: December 7, 1932 (United States)
- Running time: 88 minutes
- Country: United States
- Language: English
- Budget: $900,000
- Box office: $1 million (U.S. and Canada rentals)

A Farewell to Arms is a 1932 American pre-Code melodrama film directed by Frank Borzage and starring Helen Hayes, Gary Cooper and Adolphe Menjou. Based on the 1929 semi-autobiographical novel A Farewell to Arms by Ernest Hemingway, with a screenplay by Oliver H. P. Garrett and Benjamin Glazer, the film is about a tragic romantic love affair between an American ambulance driver and an English nurse in Italy during World War I. The film received Academy Awards for Best Cinematography and Best Sound and was nominated for Best Picture and Best Art Direction. It was the first Hemingway novel to be released as a film.

In 1960, the film entered the public domain in the United States because the last claimant, David O. Selznick, did not renew its copyright registration in the 28th year after publication.

The original Broadway play starred Glenn Anders and Elissa Landi and was staged at the National Theatre from September 22, 1930, to October 1930.

== Plot ==
A Farewell to Arms

On the Italian front during World War I, Lieutenant Frederic Henry is an American serving as an ambulance driver with the Italian Army. While carousing with his friend, Italian captain Rinaldi, a bombing raid takes place. Frederic meets English Red Cross nurse Catherine Barkley in a dark stairway. Frederic is inebriated and makes a poor first impression on Catherine and her friend Fergie.

At a concert, Catherine reveals that she had been engaged to a soldier who was killed in battle. Frederic tries to kiss her and she slaps him, but soon after, she asks him to kiss her again. He seduces her and tells her that he loves her.

Before departing for the front, Frederic tells Catherine that he will survive the battle unscathed. Catherine gives him her St. Anthony medal. However, Rinaldi had orchestrated the separation. Catherine is transferred to Milan.

At the front, Frederic is badly wounded by an artillery shell. He is sent to a hospital in Milan where Catherine rushes to his bed to embrace him. A priest performs an unofficial wedding for Frederic and Catherine. Months later, Fergie admonishes them for marrying and warns Frederic that she will kill him if Catherine becomes pregnant. Back at the hospital, Frederic is informed that his convalescent leave has been canceled. While waiting for his train, Catherine tells Frederic that she is scared of each of them dying. He promises that he will always return. Later, Catherine reveals to Fergie that she is pregnant and that she is traveling to Switzerland to give birth.

While apart, Catherine writes letters to Frederic, never revealing her pregnancy. In Turin, Rinaldi tries to entice Frederic to have some fun, but Frederic is intent on writing to Catherine. Rinaldi secretly ensures that all of Catherine's letters are returned to her without reaching Frederic. The hospital at Milan also returns Frederic's letters. He deserts and travels to Milan to find Catherine. In Milan, Frederic finds Fergie, who refuses to tell him anything other than that Catherine was pregnant and has gone. Rinaldi reveals to Frederic that Catherine is going to have a baby and that she is in Brissago, apologizing for his part in keeping the lovers apart.

While Frederic is rushing to Brissago, Catherine is taken to a hospital as the time of birth is near. Frederic arrives as Catherine undergoes a Caesarean section. After the operation, a surgeon tells Frederic that the baby boy was stillborn. When Catherine regains consciousness, she and Frederic plan their future, but she fears that she will die. Frederic tells her that they can never really be parted. She dies in Frederic's arms as the sun rises. Frederic lifts her body and turns slowly toward the window sobbing, "Peace, Peace."

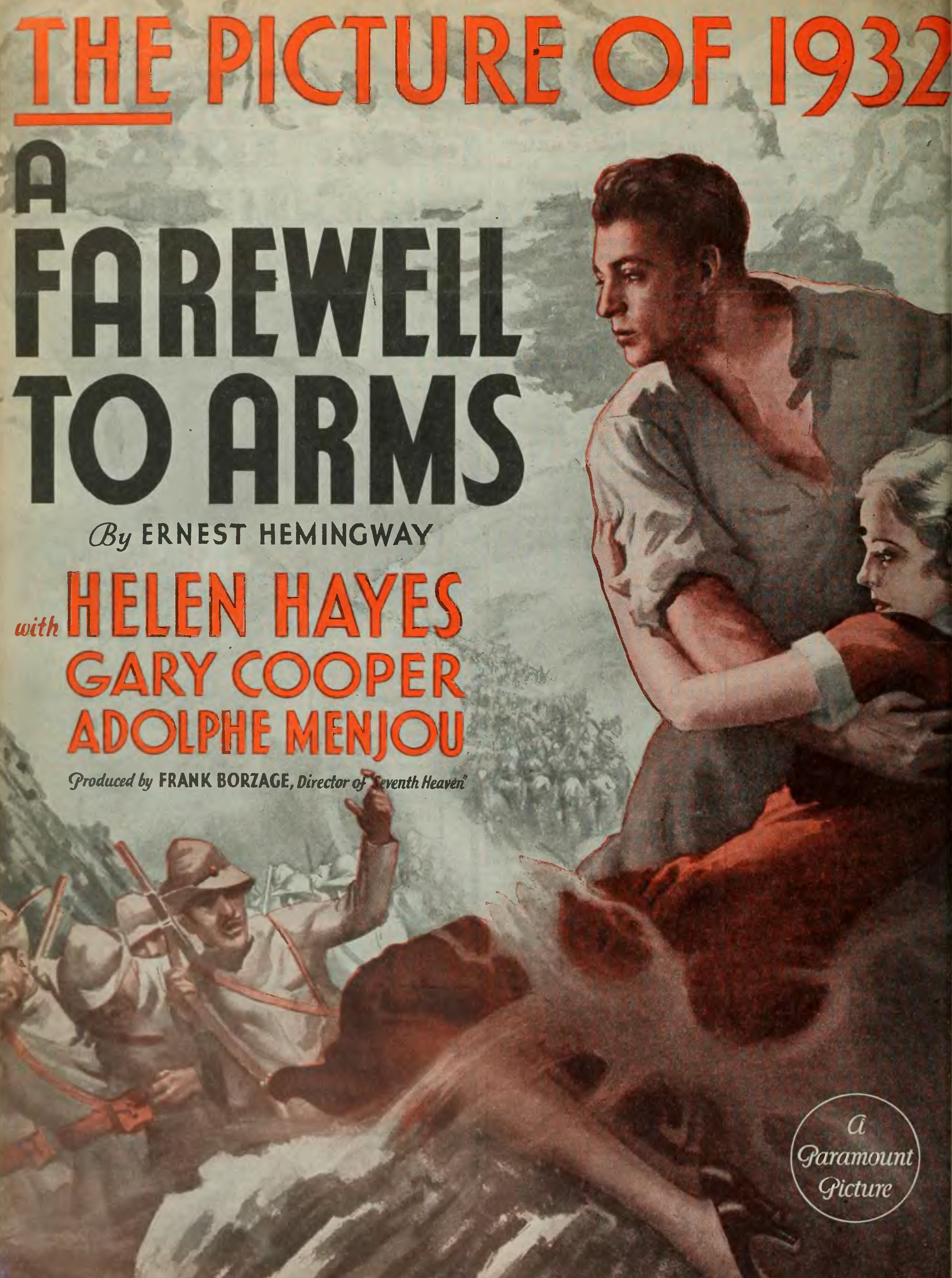
Advertisement from The Film Daily, 1932

== Cast ==
- Helen Hayes as Catherine Barkley
- Gary Cooper as Lieutenant Frederic Henry
- Adolphe Menjou as Captain Rinaldi
- Mary Philips as Helen Ferguson
- Jack La Rue as Priest
- Blanche Friderici as Head Nurse
- Mary Forbes as Miss Van Campen
- Gilbert Emery as British Major
- Agostino Borgato as Giulio (uncredited)
- Tom Ricketts as Count Greffi (uncredited)

== Music ==
The film's soundtrack includes selections from the Wagner operas Tristan und Isolde ("Liebestod"), Das Rheingold and Siegfried, as well as the storm passage from Tchaikovsky's symphonic poem Francesca da Rimini.

== Release ==
The film had its world premiere on December 7, 1932, at the Criterion theatre in New York City, being shown twice daily.

The film was available for release in two versions with different endings. There are multiple versions with different endings, one with Catherine's death, one in which she lives and another in which her fate is ambiguous. International audiences saw only the version with the tragic ending.

In 1938, the film was reissued with the running time cut to 78 minutes. The original 89-minute version, which had not been seen since the film's original 1932 release, was long believed to be lost. However, a nitrate print was located in the David O. Selznick vaults and the uncut film was released on DVD in 1999 by Image Entertainment.

As the film was released before strict enforcement of the Production Code, its themes and content became problematic during the era of enforcement when the film was prepared for rereleases to film and television.

== Reception ==
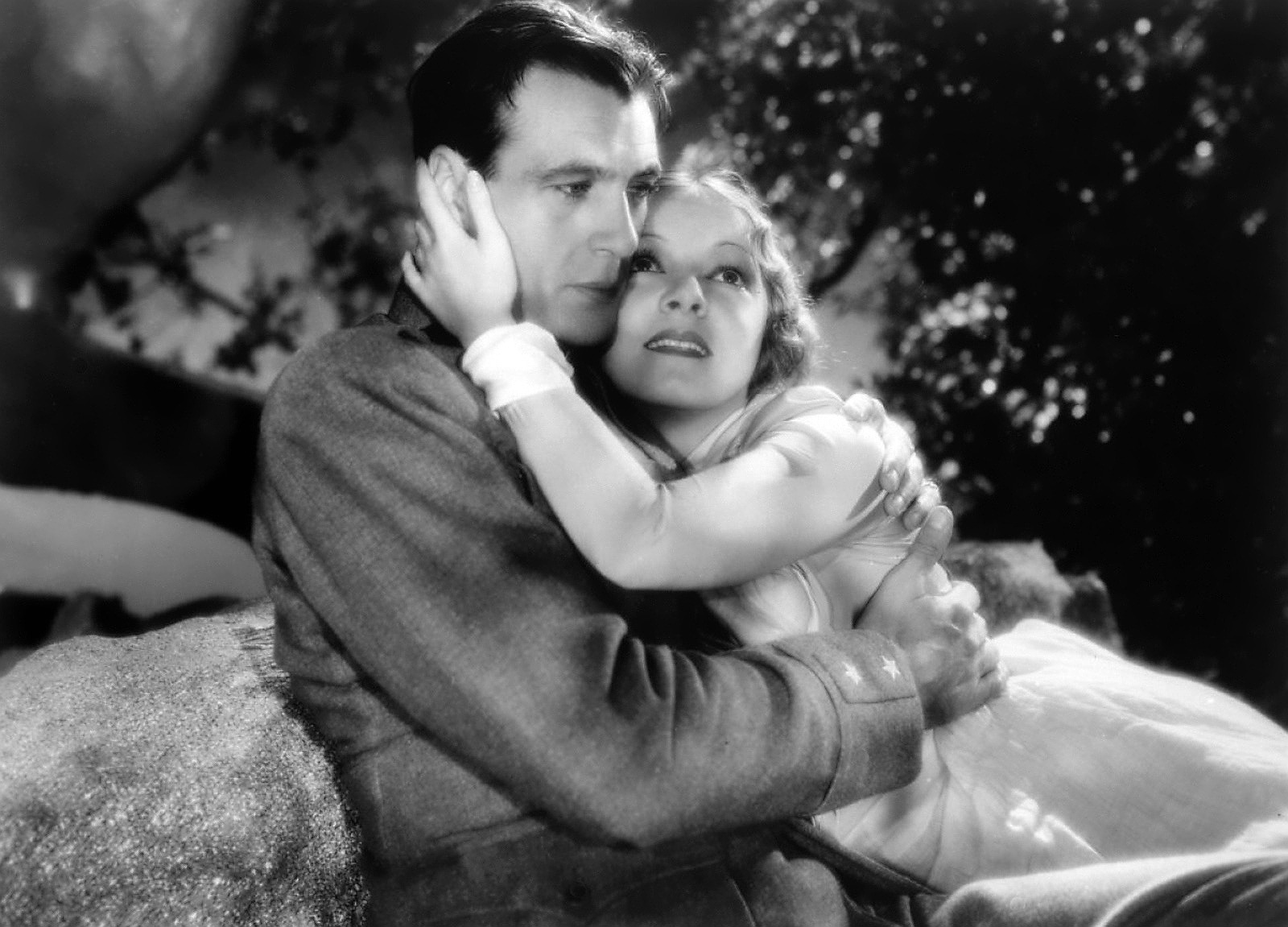
Gary Cooper and Helen Hayes

In a contemporary review for The New York Times, critic Mordaunt Hall wrote:

Bravely as it is produced for the most part, there is too much sentiment and not enough strength in the pictorial conception of Ernest Hemingway's novel ... Notwithstanding the undeniable artistry of the photography, the fine recording of voices and Frank Borzage's occasional excellent directorial ideas, one misses the author's vivid descriptions and the telling dialogue ... It is Mr. Borzage rather than Mr. Hemingway who prevails in this film and the incidents frequently are unfurled in a jerky fashion. To be true it was an extremely difficult task to tackle, a rather hopeless one in fact, considering that the story is told in the first person. Possibly if any one has not read Mr. Hemingway's book, the picture will appeal as a rather interesting if tragic romance. In some of the scenes, however, the producers appear to take it for granted that the spectators have read the book.

Mae Tinée of the Chicago Tribune wrote: "'A Farewell to Arms' is rich with all the attributes that make for a completely satisfying screen play. Humor, pathos, suspense, romance, tragedy—all are there. And it has the human touch that endears."

Irene Thirer wrote in the New York Daily News: "The picture is heart-rending and throat-hurting. It moves you so deeply that it is often difficult to see the screen, for the haze which mists your tear-filled eyes. Frank Borzage's direction is nothing less than superb. ... He tugs at your heartstrings until you positively can't stand it any more. And yet he gives a human treatment, indeed, with abundant charm and none of the saccharine."

Abel Green of Variety called it "a woman's picture essentially", "a corking flicker" and "punchy, actionful, colorful, romantic, sexy and engagingly realistic."

== Awards ==
The film was nominated for four Academy Awards, winning two:

- Academy Award for Best Picture (nominee)
- Academy Award for Art Direction (nominee)
- Academy Award for Best Cinematography (winner)
- Academy Award for Best Sound Recording – Franklin Hansen (winner)

== See also ==
- List of films in the public domain in the United States
- The House That Shadows Built (1931 promotional film by Paramount with excerpt of film showing Eleanor Boardman, later replaced by Hayes)
