= The Champ (1931 film) =

1931 film directed by King Vidor

- Theatrical release poster
- Directed by: King Vidor
- Written by: Frances Marion; Leonard Praskins
- Produced by: King Vidor; Harry Rapf (uncredited); Irving Thalberg (uncredited)
- Starring: Wallace Beery; Jackie Cooper; Irene Rich; Roscoe Ates
- Cinematography: Gordon Avil
- Edited by: Hugh Wynn
- Distributed by: Metro-Goldwyn-Mayer
- Release date: November 9, 1931
- Running time: 87 minutes
- Country: United States
- Language: English
- Budget: $356,000
- Box office: $1.6 million

The Champ is a 1931 American pre-Code film starring Wallace Beery and Jackie Cooper and directed by King Vidor from a screenplay by Frances Marion, Leonard Praskins and Wanda Tuchock. The picture tells the story of a washed-up alcoholic boxer (Beery) attempting to put his life back together for the sake of his young son (Cooper).

Beery won the Academy Award for Best Actor for his performance (sharing the prize with Fredric March for Dr. Jekyll and Mr. Hyde), Frances Marion won the Academy Award for Best Story, and the film was nominated for the Academy Award for Best Picture and Best Director. In February 2020, The Champ was shown at the 70th Berlin International Film Festival, as part of a retrospective dedicated to King Vidor's career.

== Plot ==
Jackie Cooper as Dink Purcell

Andy "Champ" Purcell is the former world heavyweight boxing champion, now down on his luck and living in squalid conditions with his eight-year-old son "Dink" in Tijuana, Mexico. Champ attempts to convince promoters to set up a fight for him, but his efforts are stymied by his alcoholism. Dink is repeatedly disappointed by his father's irresponsible actions and frequent broken promises, but his devotion to his father never wavers.

Champ is also a compulsive gambler—another vice he repeatedly promises to give up. After a winning streak, he fulfills a previous promise to buy Dink a horse, which they name "Little Champ" and plan to race. At the race track in Tijuana, Dink encounters a woman who, unbeknownst to either of them, is his mother, Linda, now remarried to a wealthy man named Tony in the United States.

Linda and Tony observe Dink and Champ together and realize that Dink is her son. Champ allows Linda to see Dink, who accepts that she is his mother. But he feels no emotion toward her, as she has never been part of his life. Linda resolves to remove Dink from the miserable atmosphere in which he's growing up and have him live with her family.

Tony catches Champ during an all-night gambling binge and asks him to turn Dink over so that he and Linda can enroll the boy in school. Champ refuses. By the end of the night, he has lost Little Champ, devastating Dink. Champ then asks Linda for money to buy the horse back, and she agrees. However, instead of using it as promised, he gambles the money away and ends up in jail, breaking Dink’s heart once again.

Ashamed, Champ finally agrees to send an unwilling Dink to live with Tony and Linda. On the train ride to California, Tony and Linda try their best to welcome Dink into their family. He does not dislike them, but he is consumed only by thoughts of his father. He runs away back to Tijuana, where he finds that Champ has a fight scheduled with the Mexican heavyweight champion. When he sees Dink, Champ returns to good spirits, trains hard, and, for the first time, really does stay away from drinking and gambling. Champ is determined to win the fight, make Dink proud of him, and use his prize money to buy back Little Champ.

Tony and Linda come back to Tijuana to watch the match, bringing best wishes and assurances that they will make no further efforts to separate Dink from Champ. The match is brutal, and Champ is seriously injured. Dink and the others in his corner urge him to throw in the towel, but Champ refuses. He musters a last burst of energy and knocks out his opponent. After the fight, he triumphantly presents Little Champ to Dink. But after witnessing his son's overjoyed reaction, Champ collapses.

He is brought into his dressing room, where a doctor determines that his injuries are fatal. Champ encourages Dink to stay strong, then dies. Despite others' attempts to comfort him, Dink cries out repeatedly, "I want the Champ!" Eventually, he sees Linda enter the room, looks at her, and exclaims, "Mother!" before running into her arms. She picks him up, and he sobs, "The Champ is dead, Mama." Holding him close, she turns and carries him out as he buries his face in her shoulder, weeping.

== Cast ==
- Wallace Beery as Andy "Champ" Purcell
- Jackie Cooper as Dink Purcell
- Irene Rich as Linda Purcell
- Roscoe Ates as Sponge
- Edward Brophy as Tim
- Hale Hamilton as Tony
- Jesse Scott as Jonah
- Marcia Mae Jones as Mary Lou

== Production ==
Wallace Beery as Andy "Champ" Purcell

Screenwriter Frances Marion wrote the title role specifically for Wallace Beery. His flourishing career in silent movies had almost abruptly ended with the advent of sound films. However, Beery returned in 1930 with an Academy Award nomination for The Big House and the huge box office success of Min and Bill with Marie Dressler. Director King Vidor eagerly took on the film since it emphasized the traditional family values and strong belief in hope—qualities he felt were essential to a good motion picture.

Beery claimed to have turned down a $500,000 offer from a syndicate of Indian studios to play Buddha in order to take the role in The Champ. Cooper was paid $1,500 a week while working on the film. A special outdoor set, rather than location shooting, was built to accommodate the Tijuana horse racing track scenes. Shooting began in mid-August 1931 and ended eight weeks later, at which time Jackie Cooper's contract with Paramount Pictures was transferred to MGM.

The film had its world premiere on November 9, 1931, at the Astor Theatre in New York City. Beery flew his own plane from Los Angeles, California cross-country to New York to attend the premiere. After the film's debut, Beery declared Cooper was a "great kid", but that he would not work with him again. Beery that promise within a year when he joined Cooper for the remake of Treasure Island and the film The Bowery.

== Assessment ==
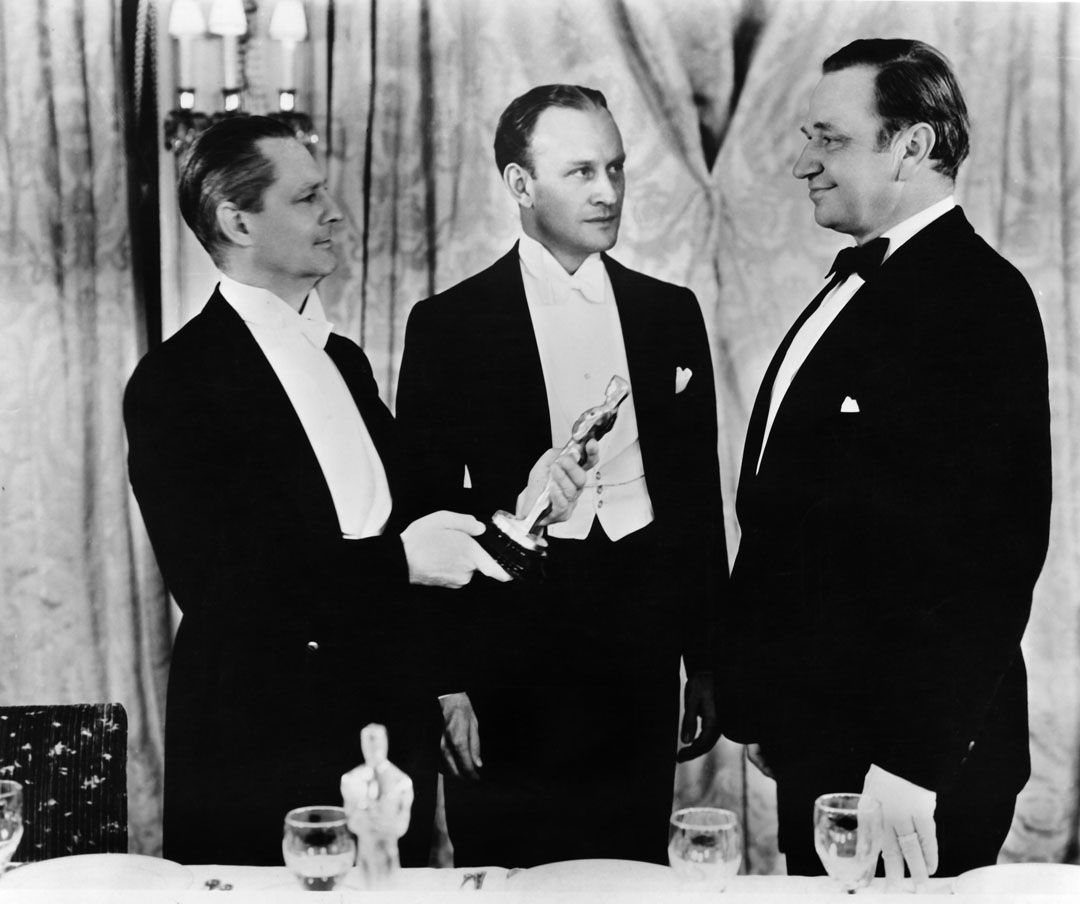
Wallace Beery receiving 1931 Best Actor Award for The Champ from Lionel Barrymore

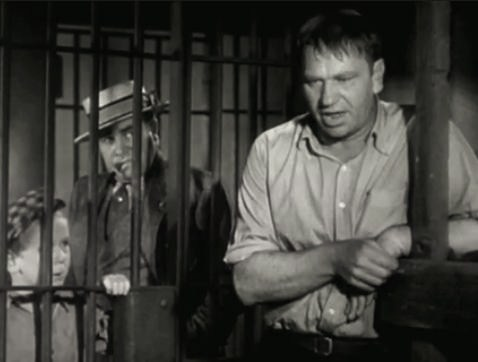
Jackie Cooper, Edward Brophy, and Wallace Beery in The Champ

The Champ, together with Beery's role in Min and Bill, catapulted Beery's career. Beery signed a contract with MGM shortly thereafter specifying that he receive a dollar more per year than any other actor on the lot, effectively making him the world's highest-paid actor. The picture also made nine-year-old Jackie Cooper the first child star of the 1930s, an era noted for its numerous, popular child actors.

At the time The Champ was released, critics criticized the film's lack of originality.

- The New York Times declared that "something more novel and subtle" was needed, although it also praised Beery's acting.
- Variety very much liked Beery in the film, noting that he delivered a "studied, adult" performance.
- Time called The Champ repetitive, blasted Cooper for sniveling, and accused director King Vidor of laying "on pathos with a steam-shovel." Nonetheless, Time praised the movie, declaring it "Utterly false and thoroughly convincing..."

Irene Thirer of the New York Daily News described the film as “so profuse and so enjoyable as the film combines the amazing talents of Jackie Cooper with the superb histrionics of Wallace Beery”.

Many critics cited the "special chemistry" between Beery and Cooper, which led the two actors to be paired again numerous times. Cooper and Beery had no such chemistry off-screen. Cooper accused Beery of upstaging and other attempts to undermine his performances, out of what Cooper presumed was jealousy. Critics today still highly praise The Champ.

The Champ has been described as an inverted women's film, because men in the film are not generally depicted at the top of the socio-economic ladder, but are shown as a primary child care provider. The famous final scene, in which the camera is thrust into Jackie Cooper's weeping face, has been compared to similar aggressive and intrusive camera work in classic motion pictures such as Liebelei (Max Ophüls, dir.; 1933), Broken Blossoms (D.W. Griffith, dir.; 1919) and the films of Roberto Rossellini.

The Champ has had significant cultural effect. A number of motion pictures in the 1930s, some of them also starring Beery, repeated the basic story about a man surrendering to drink and redeemed by the love of his long-suffering son. Film critic Judith Crist has argued that almost any film pairing an adult actor alongside a child actor must be compared to The Champ in terms of the chemistry between the actors and the effectiveness of the film. The Champ, had an immediate effect on world cinema as well. The Champ is considered one source film which inspired Yasujirō Ozu's classic Japanese film Passing Fancy (Dekigokoro, 1933). The film was, in part, the inspiration for the father and son in the Berenstain Bears books.

== Reception ==
The Champ was a big hit upon its release. According to MGM records, the film earned $917,000 domestically and $683,000 globally. The film itself also received overwhelmingly positive reviews; as of now, it currently holds a 96% freshness rating on Rotten Tomatoes.

== Awards and nominations ==
Award	Category	Nominee(s)	Result	Ref.
Academy Awards	Outstanding Production	Irving Thalberg (Metro-Goldwyn-Mayer)	Nominated	
Academy Awards	Best Director	King Vidor	Nominated	
Academy Awards	Best Actor	Wallace Beery	Won (Note: Tied with Fredric March for Dr. Jekyll and Mr. Hyde.)	
Academy Awards	Best Original Story	Frances Marion	Won	

== Remakes ==
The Champ was remade in 1953 as The Clown, starring Red Skelton as a washed-up clown rather than a washed-up boxer. It was remade again in 1979 as The Champ by Franco Zeffirelli

== See also ==
- List of boxing films
- Filmography of Wallace Beery
