= Two star =

Two star, two stars and similar may refer to:

- A grading of a hotel, restaurant, film, etc. in a star (classification) scheme
- Two star petrol, a class of Leaded petrol formerly sold in the UK
- Two-star rank, a senior military rank
- Two-Handed Trans-Atlantic Race (TwoSTAR)

== Astronomy ==
- Double star
- Binary star

== Arts and entertainment ==
- Les deux étoiles Théophile Gautier 1848
- 2 stars (song), performed by Meaghan Martin for the TV movie "Camp Rock"
- The Two Stars (ballet), first performed 1870 in Russia
- "Two Star", a song from the 1994 album Amplified Heart by Everything but the Girl that references the petrol class

== See also ==
- Double Star (disambiguation)
- STAR-2, Orbital Sciences Corp satellite bus model
- For other numbers of stars, see Category:Star ranking systems
- Chatur Singh Two Star, a 2011 Indian film
