= Seven star =

Seven or 7 Star(s) or star(s) may refer to:

== Astronomy ==
- The classical planets (Seven Luminaries), being the five planets visible to the naked eye, plus the Sun and Moon
- Pleiades, also known as the Seven Sisters and the Seven Stars
- The Big Dipper or The Plough, the seven brightest stars of Ursa Major
- The Little Dipper
- Orion (constellation), (seven stars with four being his shoulders and feet plus three in Orion's Belt

== Geographic features ==
- Seven-star Cave, Guilin, Guangxi, China
- Seven Star Crags, limestone crags in Guangdong Province, China
- Seven Star Mountain, extinct volcano in Taiwan

== Pubs and taverns ==
- The Seven Stars, a popular English pub name - see Pub names#Trades, tools and products
  - Seven Stars, Bristol
  - Seven Stars, Holborn, London
  - Seven Stars, West Kensington, London
  - The Seven Stars, Falmouth, Cornwall
  - The Seven Stars Inn, Robertsbridge, Sussex
- The Seven Stars Tavern
  - Seven Stars Tavern, MD, Baltimore, the founding place of the (U.S.) Independent Order of Odd Fellows
  - Seven Stars Tavern, NJ, Woodstown, on the (U.S.) National Register of Historic Places

== Rating systems ==
- Star (classification), a grading system

== Sporting ==
- Seven Star Praying Mantis Boxing, a subdivision of Northern Praying Mantis
- Seven Stars F.C., an association football club from Cape Town, South Africa
- Seven Stars (Cape Verdean basketball club), a basketball club

== Literature ==
- The Jewel of Seven Stars, a 1903 novel by Bram Stoker
- Seven Stars, a collection of short stories by Kim Newman, related to the Stoker novel

== Music ==
- Seven Stars (EP), a 2011 EP by Fennesz
- "7 Stars", a song from the New Magnetic Wonder album by The Apples in Stereo
- "Seven Stars" (Air song)
- "Seven for the seven stars in the sky", a line of the song Green Grow the Rushes, O
- "Seven Stars", a song from the Theories of Flight album by Progressive Metal band Fates Warning

== Other ==
- Seven Stars, short name of the videogame Super Mario RPG
- Seven Stars (TV channel), a Saudi Arabian TV channel
- Sevenstar Flying Squid, Martialia hyadesii
- Seven Stars (cigarette), a brand of cigarette
- Seven Stars in Kyushu, an excursion train in Japan
- John's vision of the Son of Man, which includes an image of Jesus with seven stars in his right hand
- Seven Stars Luxury Hospitality and Lifestyle Awards, tourism and hospitality awards founded in 2013

== See also ==
- Heptagram or seven-pointed star
