= Star (classification) =

Rating system using star graphemes

A typical format for a star rating, showing three out of five stars

Star ratings are a type of rating scale using a star symbol or similar typographical mark. (Note: But never an asterisk in sports, as that has a negative meaning in that context.) It is used by reviewers for ranking things such as films, TV shows, restaurants, and hotels. For example, a system of one to five stars is commonly used in hotel ratings, with five stars being the highest rating.

Similar systems have been proposed for electing politicians in the form of score voting and STAR voting.

== Historical usage ==
Repeated symbols used for a ranking date to Mariana Starke's 1820 guidebook, which used exclamation points to indicate works of art of special value:

...I have endeavored... to furnish Travellers with correct lists of the objects best worth notice...; at the same time marking, with one or more exclamation points (according to their merit), those works which are deemed peculiarly excellent.

Murray's Handbooks for Travellers and then the Baedeker Guides (starting in 1844) borrowed this system, using stars instead of exclamation points, first for points of interest and later for hotels.

The Michelin restaurant guide introduced a star as a restaurant rating in 1926, which was expanded to a system of one to three stars in 1931.

== Media ==
=== Books ===
In 1915, Edward O'Brien began editing The Best American Short Stories. This annual compiled O'Brien's personal selection of the previous year's best short stories. O'Brien claimed to read as many as 8,000 stories a year, and his editions contained lengthy tabulations of stories and magazines, ranked on a scale of zero to three stars, representing O'Brien's notion of their "literary permanence." He further listed stories with a ranking of three stars "in a special 'Roll of Honor.'" In this list, O'Brien attached an additional asterisk to those stories that he personally enjoyed.

Oliver Herford's essay Say it with Asterisks, quips "Never, I think, were a mob of overworked employees so pitifully huddled together in an ill-ventilated factory as are the Asterisks in this Sweatshop of Twaddle." Literary editor Katrina Kenison dismisses O'Brien's grading systems as "excessive at best, fussy and arbitrary at worst."

Book reviewers generally do not use a star-rating system though there are exceptions. The West Coast Review of Books rates books on a scale of one ("poor") to five ("superior") stars. According to editor D. David Dreis, readers love the ratings but publishers don't.

=== Films ===
In the 31 July 1928 issue of the New York Daily News, the newspaper's film critic Irene Thirer began grading movies on a scale of zero to three stars. Three stars meant 'excellent,' two 'good,' and one star meant 'mediocre.' And no stars at all 'means the picture's right bad,'" wrote Thirer. Carl Bialik speculates that this may have been the first time a film critic used a star-rating system to grade movies. "The one-star review of The Port of Missing Girls launched the star system, which the newspaper promised would be 'a permanent thing.'

According to film scholar Gerald Peary, few newspapers adopted this practice until the French film magazine Cahiers du cinéma "started polling critics in the 1950s and boiling their judgment down to a star rating, with a bullet reserved for movies that the magazine didn't like." The highest rating any film earned was five stars. The British film magazine Sight and Sound also rated films on a scale of one to four stars. Some critics use a "half-star" option in between basic star ratings. Leonard Maltin goes one further and gives Naked Gun 33 1/3: The Final Insult a 2 1/3 star rating.

Critics do not agree on what the cutoff is for a recommendation, even when they use the same scale. Gene Siskel and Roger Ebert "both consider[ed] a three-star rating to be the cutoff for a "thumbs up" on their scales of zero to four stars. Film critic Dave Kehr—who also uses a 0–4 star scale—believes "two stars is a borderline recommendation". On a five-star scale, regardless of the bottom rating, 3 stars is often the lowest positive rating, though judging on a purely mathematical basis, 2 1/2 stars would be the dividing line between good and bad on a 0–5 scale. Common Sense Media uses a scale of one to five, where 3 stars are "Just fine; solid" and anything lower is "Disappointing" at best.

There is no agreement on what the lowest rating should be. Some critics make "one star" or a "half-star" their lowest rating. Dave Kehr believes that "one star" indicates the film has redeeming facets, and instead uses zero stars as his lowest rating.

Examples of rating scales:

- 0–4: Roger Ebert, Gene Siskel, David Kehr and Peter Travers
- 0.5–4: Steven H. Scheuer's now-defunct film guide grades films from a half-star ("abysmal") to four stars ("excellent"). Despite this, Scheuer's guide intentionally gives Wes Craven's film The Last House on the Left no stars, making it the lowest-rated film in the book.
- 0–5: The Times
- 1–4: Film critic Leonard Maltin rates films on a scale of one through four stars, although his guide notes that there is no actual "one star" rating. For these "bottom-of-the-barrel movies", Maltin's guide uses the citation "BOMB". However, according to Maltin, the 1981 Bo Derek film Tarzan, the Ape Man "nearly forced the editors of this book to devise a rating lower than BOMB".
- 1–5: Common Sense Media, Empire

Critics have different ways of denoting the lowest rating when this is a "zero". Some such as Peter Travers display empty stars. Jonathan Rosenbaum and Dave Kehr use a round black dot. Leslie Halliwell uses a blank space. The Globe and Mail uses a "0", or as their former film critic dubbed it, the "death doughnut". Roger Ebert used a thumbs-down symbol. Other critics use a black dot.

Critics also do not agree on what the lower ratings signify, let alone the lowest rating. While Maltin's and Scheuer's guides respectively explain that lowest rated films are "BOMB(s)" and "abysmal", British film critic Leslie Halliwell instead writes that no star "indicates a totally routine production or worse; such films may be watchable but are at least equally missable." Like Halliwell and Dave Kehr, film critic Jonathan Rosenbaum believes one-star films have some merit, however unlike Halliwell, Rosenbaum believes that no stars indicate a "worthless" movie. Roger Ebert occasionally gave zero stars to films he deemed "artistically inept and morally repugnant." Scheuer's guide calls "one and a half star" films "poor", and "one star" films "bad".

Not all film critics have approved of star ratings. Film scholar Robin Wood wondered if Sight and Sound readers accepted "such blackening of their characters." Jay Scott of Canada's The Globe and Mail was an opponent of using symbols to summarize a review and wrote in 1992 that "When Globe editors first proposed the four-star system of rating movies about a year ago, the response from Globe critics was, to put it mildly, underwhelming." More recently, Mark Kermode has expressed a dislike of star ratings (assigned to his online reviews but not his print or radio reviews) on the grounds that his verdicts are sometimes too complex to be expressed as a rating.

=== Comedy and theatre ===
Star ratings are also given out at stand-up comedy performances and theatre productions. Star ratings are given at the Edinburgh Festival Fringe, the largest arts festival in the world. Since 2010, the British Comedy Guide has collected over 4,300 reviews of around 1,110 different acts, across 83 different publications in the form of a star rating.

The use of star ratings is controversial because the public may ignore the reviews and concentrate more the star ratings alone.

=== Video games ===
Star ratings are not often used to rate the quality of a video game but are rather used within certain games for varying purposes. One notable use of the star system is to grade a player's performance in completing a level with up to three stars, used in many modern multi-level games like Angry Birds. This three-star rating system challenges the player to repeat and fully master previously beaten levels in order to receive a perfect 3-star rating, which may confer other benefits or bonus content. Another use of star ratings is to denote the rarity of characters in video games where players are tasked in collecting numerous characters, such as Star Wars: Galaxy of Heroes and Marvel: Contest of Champions, in which stronger and rarer characters are marked with more stars to make them appear more valuable. Stars are also used to rank a game or stage's difficulty (such as in the SNES version of Street Fighter II and its updates), or to rate the attributes of a selectable character or, in sports games, a team.

== Restaurant ratings ==
Restaurant guides and reviewers often use stars in restaurant ratings. The Michelin system reserves star for exceptional restaurants, and gives up to three; the vast majority of recommended restaurants have no star at all. Other guides now use up to four or five stars, with one-star being the lowest rating. The stars are sometimes replaced by symbols such as a fork or spoon. Some guides use separate scales for food, service, ambiance, and even noise level.

The Michelin system remains the best known star system. A single star denotes "a very good restaurant in its category", two stars "excellent cooking, worth a detour", and three stars, "exceptional cuisine, worth a special journey".

Michelin stars are awarded only for the quality of food and wine; the luxury level of the restaurant is rated separately, using a scale of one ("quite comfortable") to five ("luxury in the traditional style") crossed fork and spoon symbols.

== Hotel ratings ==
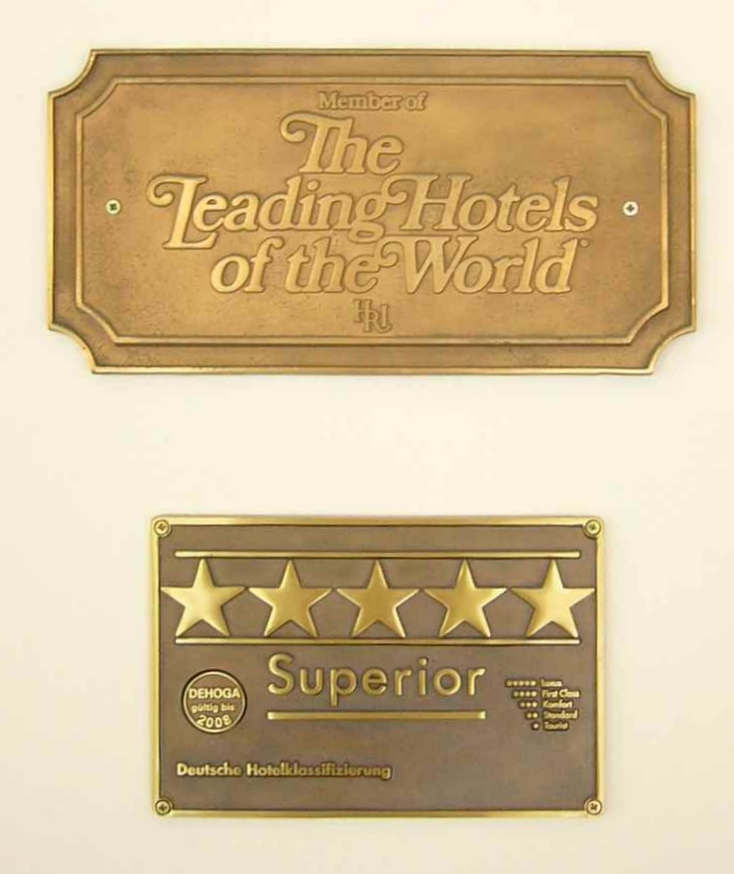
"Five-star superior" rating at the Hotel Vier Jahreszeiten Kempinski in Munich, Germany

Hotel luxury is often denoted by stars.

Other classifiers, such as the AAA Five Diamond Award, use diamonds instead of stars to express hotel rating levels.

Hotels are assessed in traditional systems and rest heavily on the facilities provided. Some consider this disadvantageous to smaller hotels whose quality of accommodation could fall into one class but the lack of an item such as an elevator would prevent it from reaching a higher categorization.

In recent years hotel rating systems have also been criticized by some who argue that the rating criteria for such systems are overly complex and difficult for the general public to understand. It has been suggested that the lack of a unified global system for rating hotels may also undermine the usability of such schemes.

== Financial product ratings ==
In the UK, providers and comparison websites often use stars to indicate how feature-rich financial products are.

== Military ranks ==
The most senior military ranks in all services are classified by a star system in many countries, ranging from one-star rank which typically corresponds to brigadier, brigadier general, commodore or air commodore, to the most senior five-star ranks, which include Admiral of the Fleet, Grand Admiral, Field Marshal, General of the Army and Marshal of the Air Force—some five-star ranks only exist during large-scale conflicts.

== Other ==
=== American college football ===
Recruits entering American college football are commonly ranked on a five-star scale, with five representing what scouts think will be the best college players.

=== Transport safety ===
International organisations use a star rating to rank the safety of transportation. EuroRAP have developed a Road Protection Score which is a scale for Star Rating roads for how well they protect the user from death or disabling injury when a crash occurs. The assessment evaluates the safety that is 'built into' the road through its design, in combination with the way traffic is managed on it. The RPS protocol has also been adapted and used by AusRAP, usRAP and iRAP.

Euro NCAP awards 'star ratings' based on the performance of vehicles in crash tests, including front, side and pole impacts, and impacts with pedestrians.

The United States National Highway Traffic Safety Administration (NHTSA) also uses a star ranking to rank the safety of vehicles in crash tests, including front, side, pole impacts, and rollovers, with 5 stars being the most secure.

=== Voting and preferences ===
Some web content voting systems use five-star grades. This allows users to distinguish content more precisely than with binary "like buttons".

Many recommender systems, such as MovieLens or Amazon.com, ask people to express preferences using star ratings, then predict what other items those people are likely to enjoy. Predictions are often expressed in terms of the number of predicted stars.

== Unicode ==
The Unicode Standard encodes several characters used for star ratings in the Miscellaneous Symbols and Arrows block:

Character	Code point	Name
★	U+2605	BLACK STAR (Note: Unicode uses the terms "black" and "white" to mean "solid" and "outlined". The colour displayed is the developer's choice.)
☆	U+2606	WHITE STAR
⯨	U+2BE8	LEFT HALF BLACK STAR
⯩	U+2BE9	RIGHT HALF BLACK STAR
⯪	U+2BEA	STAR WITH LEFT HALF BLACK
⯫	U+2BEB	STAR WITH RIGHT HALF BLACK

The STAR WITH LEFT HALF BLACK and LEFT HALF BLACK STAR are intended for use in left-to-right contexts where the half star is positioned to the right of one or more whole stars, whereas the STAR WITH RIGHT HALF BLACK and RIGHT HALF BLACK STAR are intended for use in right-to-left contexts (such as Arabic or Hebrew) where the half star is positioned to the left of one or more whole stars.

== See also ==
- One star (disambiguation)
- Two star (disambiguation)
- Three star (disambiguation)
- Four star (disambiguation)
- Five star (disambiguation)
- Six star (disambiguation)
- Seven star (disambiguation)
- Ten star (disambiguation)
