= Edgcumbe Arms =

Riverside pub and inn at Cremyll, Cornwall

The Edgcumbe Arms
- Location within Cornwall

General information
- Location: Cremyll, Cornwall, England, Cremyll, Torpoint PL10 1HX
- Coordinates: 50.3605°N 4.1753°W
- Current tenants: St Austell Brewery (leaseholder)
- Opened: Late 17th century
- Owner: Edgcumbe family (freehold)

The Edgcumbe Arms is a Grade II listed public house and former passage house beside the historic Cremyll Ferry in Cremyll, Cornwall, England. Part of the Mount Edgcumbe Country Park, it overlooks the Hamoaze and River Tamar opposite Plymouth, and has long been tied to ferry traffic between Cornwall and Devon. The inn and its associated ferry have been described in several regional histories of transport and coastal settlement.

== History ==
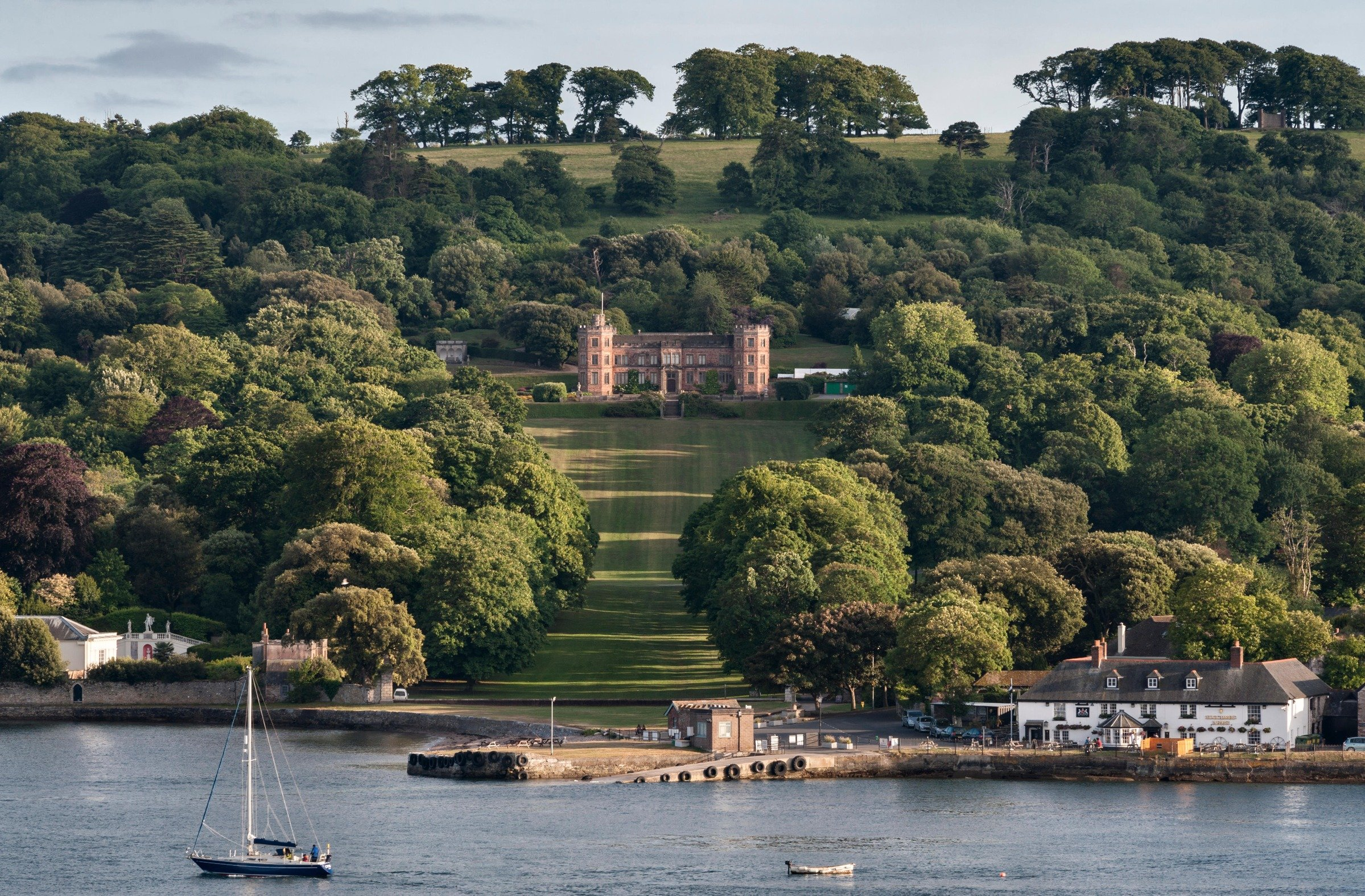
The Edgcumbe Arms on the Mount Edgcumbe Estate, from the Tamar Estuary

Built on the site of a former coastal limestone quarry known as Franks Quarry, the building dates from the late 17th century and was remodelled in the early 18th century. Around 1730, Richard Edgcumbe obtained permission to move the ferry point from Barn Pool to Cremyll, establishing the present landing beside the inn. At this time the inn became a passage house serving travellers crossing between Cornwall and Plymouth.

For many years the inn was operated directly by the Earls of Mount Edgcumbe and the freehold still remains part of the Edgcumbe Estate, now in trust and managed by daughters of Robert Charles Edgcumbe, 8th Earl of Mount Edgcumbe, Lady Megan Edgcumbe and Lady Vanessa Edgcumbe. In 1994, Robert the 8th Earl granted a 50-year lease to St Austell Brewery, who now let the site as part of their leased and tenant estate.

=== 1995 fire and rebuild ===
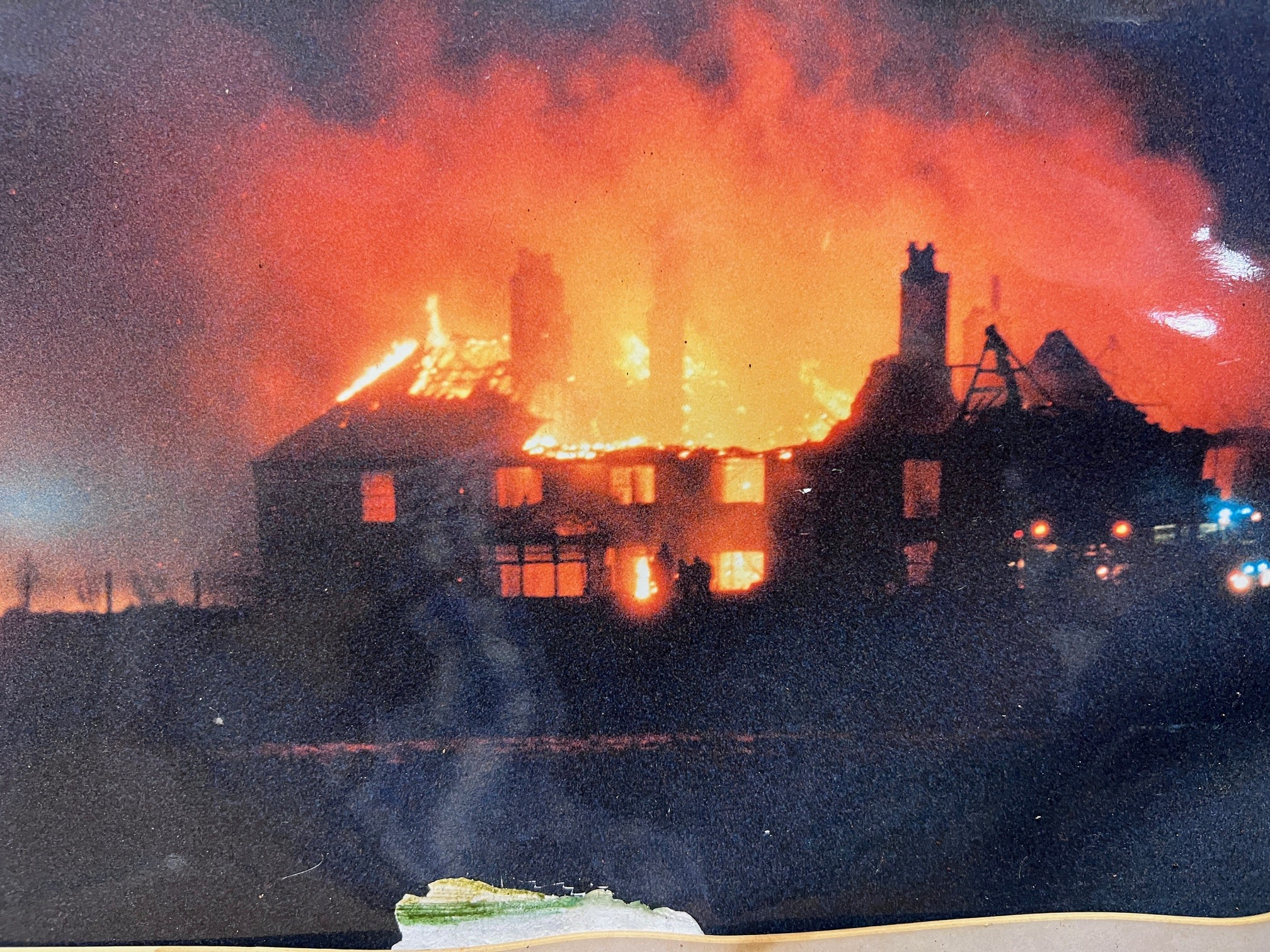
1995 fire

On the night of 10 January 1995, the Edgcumbe Arms was devastated by fire. The Evening Herald devoted its front page to the incident, describing "dramatic night views across the Tamar as the pub blazed" and calling it "the epitome of the village inn – with a colourful history." Firefighters contained the blaze, but most of the structure was gutted; the inn was subsequently rebuilt and later reopened. The incident is also recorded in Cowdery's published local history Plymouth On This Day, which recounts the dramatic fire and rebuild.

=== 21st century ===
After a closure in late 2023, the pub reopened under new landlords in April 2024. The Herald also covered the reopening, noting the new landlords and its riverside setting. In April 2025 the pub temporarily closed following flooding before reopening. The Plymouth Herald also reported its 2023 closure citing theft and rising costs, describing the Edgcumbe Arms as "one of Cornwall's most recognisable riverside pubs".

== Architecture and setting ==
The pub's architectural significance is also acknowledged in Pevsner and Beacham's *Buildings of England: Cornwall*, which notes the Edgcumbe Estate's clustered historic buildings at Cremyll. Historic England records a two-storey, five-bay front in rendered stone rubble with a hipped slate roof and attached stable block; interior features include early-18th-century panelling, fireplaces and stair details.

The inn occupies a prominent position at the Cremyll entrance to Mount Edgcumbe Country Park, a Grade I listed historic landscape of around 885 acres on the Rame Peninsula, developed in the 18th century by the Edgcumbe family and noted for its formal gardens, temples, follies and woodland, with views across Plymouth Sound and the River Tamar. The Country Park is jointly managed by Cornwall Council and Plymouth City Council and is open to the public year-round.

The Cremyll crossing is one of several historic ferries across the River Tamar, including Saltash, Calstock and Gunnislake. Langley and Small (1984) and Kittridge (2003) identify the Cremyll ferry as among the most prominent of these routes, linking Plymouth with the Rame Peninsula and Mount Edgcumbe.

== Passage-house context ==
The Edgcumbe Arms' role as a ferry-side inn corresponds to a wider tradition of "passage houses" at estuarial crossings. The function of the Edgcumbe Arms as a ferry-side inn aligns with what Fidler (2021) identifies as "border hospitality" within Cornish coastal settlements, reflecting dual maritime and landward roles.

The 13th-century Pandora Inn on Mylor Creek similarly served as a ferry inn. The Antony Passage Ferry near Saltash is documented in 14th-century records as "the passage across the water of Lynher." The Helford Passage Ferry in Cornwall is thought to have operated for over a millennium.

== Reception ==
The inn has been described by the Plymouth Herald as a "400-year-old pub carvery with epic sea views." It is also listed in the CAMRA WhatPub database, which notes its historic character and waterside setting. The pub has also appeared in several editions of The Good Pub Guide, which commended its setting beside the ferry and views across the Hamoaze.

== See also ==
- Jamaica Inn
- Seven Stars, Falmouth
