= Ten star =

Ten star or similar may refer to:

- Ten-star household, a status awarded to households in rural China
- Ten Star Generals, a 1952 story about the Disney fictional organization: Junior Woodchucks
