= Four star =

Four star, 4 star, **** or similar may refer to:

== Quality grading system ==
- Four star grade in a Star (classification) system, such as for films, TV shows, restaurants, and hotels
  - Hotel rating
  - Restaurant rating
  - UEFA stadium categories

== Art, literature and entertainment ==
- Four-Star Spectacular, a 1970s comic book series
- 4-Star, a ZX spectrum game by J. K. Greye Software
- Four Star Mary, an alternative rock group formed in California in 1997
- 4 Star Records, a 1950s country music record label
- Four Stars (album), by The Greenhornes (2010)
- Four Stars (1967 film), a film by Andy Warhol
- Four Stars (2006 film), a French comedy film
- Four Star Television (also Four Star Films, Four Star Productions, and Four Star International), an American TV production company (1952–1989)
- Four Star Playhouse, American TV anthology series 1952–1956
- Four Star Playhouse (radio program), American radio anthology series 1949
- Four Star Revue, American variety/comedy program 1950–1953

== Businesses ==
- Four Star Air Cargo, a former cargo airline based in Puerto Rico
- Four Star Pizza, an Irish fast food company
- Four Star Theater, a former movie theater in Los Angeles
- Fourstar clothing, part of Girl Distribution Company

== Other uses ==
- ****, indicating a censored Four-letter word
- Four-star rank, senior military rank
- Star of IV-class luminosity, a Stellar classification
- Four star petrol, a class of leaded petrol sold in the UK until 2000
- Four Stars, a name of 4 of the Bob Hope British Classic golf tournaments
- A reference to the Flag of Chicago, which uses four six-pointed stars (✶✶✶✶)

== See also ==
- 4-Starr Collection, 1995 EP by Ringo Starr
