= Passage House =

Type of British public house associated with ferries

Passage house is a historical term in South West England for inns or public houses located at ferry crossings, fords, or estuarine passages. These establishments served travellers waiting for or using ferries and often provided food, drink and lodging. The name survives in a number of pubs and place names, especially in south-west England and along the River Severn.

== History ==
River crossings were vital to local and regional travel before the widespread construction of bridges. Inns sited at these points provided shelter for travellers awaiting tides, boats, or favourable weather. Many became known simply as "Passage House" in reference to the ferry passage they served.

The growth of bridges and railways in the 19th century reduced the importance of ferry crossings. Some passage houses declined or closed, while others continued as ordinary pubs or were redeveloped as hotels.

== Geography ==
The best-documented passage houses are concentrated in Devon and Cornwall, especially along the River Tamar, River Teign and River Exe. Comparable examples exist on the Severn Estuary, where ferries connected Gloucestershire, Monmouthshire and Somerset.

== Examples ==
- The Edgcumbe Arms, Cremyll, Cornwall – associated with the Cremyll Ferry to Plymouth; Historic England notes the inn became a passage house c.1730.
- Ferry House Inn, Saltash Passage, River Tamar – long linked to the Cornwall–Devon ferry until the opening of the Royal Albert Bridge (1859).
- Ferryboat Inn, Helford Passage, Cornwall – 16th-century inn beside the Helford crossing.
- Passage Inn, Topsham, Devon – Grade II listed pub on Ferry Road, documented with the Topsham ferry since 1721.
- Passage House Inn, Hackney, Kingsteignton, Devon – located by an ancient ford of the River Teign; recorded in the Devon Historic Environment Record.
- Passage House Inn, Shaldon, Devon – situated near the Teignmouth–Shaldon ferry.
- Old Passage House, Aust, Gloucestershire – listed building adjacent to the Aust ferry, known as the "Old Passage" across the Severn.
- New Passage House, Monmouthshire – predecessor of the later New Passage Hotel serving the ferry–rail link across the Severn.
- Old Passage Inn, Arlingham, Gloucestershire – near the Arlingham Passage ferry to Newnham.

== Decline and modern use ==
Construction of bridges such as the Tamar Bridge (1961) and the Severn crossings in the 20th century removed the need for many ferry passages. Surviving passage houses usually function as ordinary pubs, hotels or restaurants while retaining their riverside locations and historical names.

== Terminology and usage ==
The word passage in early modern English referred broadly to a river crossing or ferry. Dictionaries record passage-house as an archaic term for a ferryhouse, and ferry-house as a keeper’s dwelling or house at a ferry wharf. Historic building records often use related titles such as Ferry Inn or Ferryboat Inn for inns performing the same role.

== Architectural context ==
Listed examples typically present as 17th–19th-century waterside inns with adjoining quays or slipways, reflecting their integration with ferry infrastructure. Pevsner’s Buildings of England volumes for Devon and Gloucestershire also note the siting of passage and ferry inns in relation to crossing points. Victoria County History entries for Gloucestershire document the Old and New Passage ferries and their associated inns. Regional studies such as Langley & Small’s survey of south-west ferries provide further context on the relationship between ferries and adjacent inns.
