= Six star =

Six or 6 Star(s) or star(s) can refer to:

- Six-star rank, an extremely senior rank, rarely held
- A grading of a hotel, restaurant, movie, TV, theatre or musical work or performance - see star (classification)
- Six stars, central to the plot of RG Veda manga series based on Vedic mythology
