= Rural society in China =

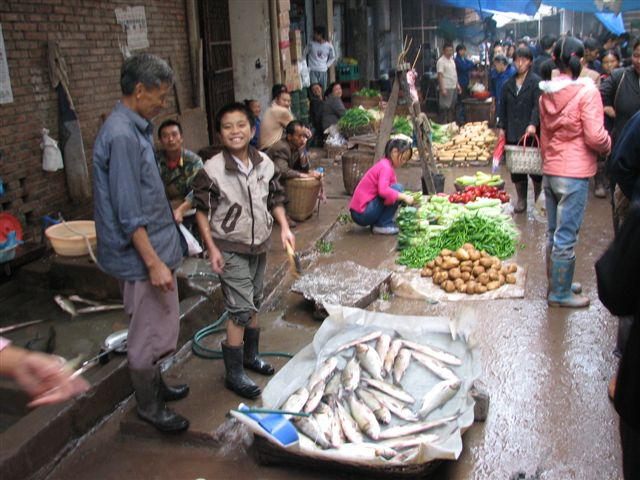
Fish farmer at peasant market in Danshan, Sichuan in September 2005

Rural society in the People's Republic of China encompasses less than half of China's population (roughly 45%) and has a varied range of standard of living and means of living. Life in rural China differs from that of urban China. In southern and coastal China, rural areas are developing and, in some cases, statistically approaching urban economies. In northwest and western regions, rural society is still perceived as lowly and primitive. Basic needs such as running water and accessible transportation are a problem in these areas.

== History ==
=== Republic of China ===
During the Republic of China period, neither the Beiyang government or the later Nanjing government succeeded in consolidating governance in rural China. Traditional rural leaders continued to hold power through economic means, interpersonal relationships, and symbolic resources like lineage.

=== Founding of the People's Republic ===
One of the major avowed objectives of the Chinese Communist Party (CCP) during its rise to prominence between 1921 and 1949 was the improvement of the standard of living of the average Chinese citizen, the vast majority of whom were rural dwellers. During the pre-1936 period, the CCP played a major role in transforming rural life in areas it influenced or controlled. A major area was land reform, where control was taken from traditional land owners and wealthy peasants, and appropriated to the state, that is, collectivized. China in the early post-1949 period saw increases in mechanization of agriculture, the spread of electricity, running water, and modern technology to rural areas. However, by the late 1950s, much remained to be done.

Mao noted that most benefits were accruing not to the rural areas, where the vast majority of Chinese still lived, and who were the ostensible focus of the revolution, but to urban centers. Identity card systems channeled unequal degrees of resources, including food rations, to urbanites and rural dwellers.

In the 1950s, programs encouraged young people to extend new agricultural technology and methods in rural China.

=== Great Leap Forward ===
During the Great Leap Forward campaign of 1958 to 1961, China's leaders attempted to accelerate collectivization and dramatically increase the pace of industrial production throughout the country, particularly in rural areas. This mostly involved small-scale production, such as the smelting of "backyard" steel. It was thought that through collectivization and mass labour, China's steel production would surpass that of the United Kingdom within only 15 years from the start of the "leap."

An experimental commune was established in Henan early in 1958, and soon communes spread throughout the country. Tens of millions were mobilized to produce a single commodity that was symbolic of industrialization: steel. Approximately 25,000 communes were set up, each with around 5,000 households. The hope was to industrialize by making use of the massive supply of cheap labor and avoid having to import heavy machinery. Small backyard steel furnaces were built in every commune where peasants produced small nuggets of cast iron made from scrap metal. Simultaneously, peasant communities were collectivised.

The Great Leap Forward is now widely seen, both within and outside China, as a major economic disaster. Peasants often abandoned farming to produce steel or work in other industrial production. The three years between 1959 and 1962 were known as the "Three Bitter Years," the Three Years of Natural Disasters (although this name is now rarely used in China), and the Great Leap Famine, as the Chinese people suffered from extreme shortages of food. The period had a profound impact on the history of rural life in China.

==== Sent-down youth ====
Sent-down, rusticated, or educated youth (Chinese: 下乡青年), also known as the zhiqing, were young people who left the urban districts of the People's Republic of China (willingly or under coercion) to live and work in rural areas as part of the Down to the Countryside Movement from the 1950s to the end of the Cultural Revolution. Most young people who went to the rural communities had received a primary- or secondary-school education, and only a small minority had reached the post-secondary (or university) level.

==== Down to the countryside movement ====
The Up to the Mountains and Down to the Countryside Movement, often known simply as the Down to the Countryside Movement, was a policy instituted in the People's Republic of China between the mid-1950s and 1978. As a result of what he perceived to be pro-bourgeois thinking prevalent during the Cultural Revolution, Chairman Mao Zedong declared certain privileged urban youth would be sent to mountainous areas or farming villages to learn from the workers and farmers there. In total, approximately 17 million youth were sent to rural areas as a result of the movement. Usually only the oldest child had to go, but younger siblings could volunteer to go instead.

Chairman Mao's policy differed from Chinese president Liu Shaoqi's early 1960s sending-down policy in its political context. President Liu instituted the first sending-down policy to redistribute excess urban population following the Great Chinese Famine and the Great Leap Forward. Mao's stated aim for the policy was to ensure that urban students could "develop their talents to the full" through education amongst the rural population.

Many fresh high school graduates, who became known as the so-called sent-down youth (also known in China as "educated youth" and abroad as "rusticated youth"), were forced out of the cities and effectively exiled to remote areas of China. Some commentators consider these people, many of whom lost the opportunity to attend university, "China's Lost Generation". Famous authors who have written about their experiences during the movement include Nobel laureate Liu Xiaobo, Jiang Rong, Ma Bo and Zhang Chengzhi, all of whom went to Inner Mongolia. Dai Sijie's Balzac and the Little Chinese Seamstress has received great praise for its take on life for the young people sent to rural villages of China during the movement (see scar literature). CCP general secretary Xi Jinping was also among the youth sent to rural areas. Xi was a send-down youth for seven years until he enrolled in Tsinghua University's chemical engineer program in 1975.

In 1978, the government ended the movement, but the sent-down youth were not allowed to return to their homes in urban areas, with exception of those who enrolled in university through Gaokao and some whose parents or relatives were high-level officials. After a huge wave of protests across the country by the sent-down youth especially in Xishuangbanna, the State Council eventually allowed the sent-down youths to return to urban areas in early 1979.

Resettlement in the countryside (chāduì luòhù) was a more permanent form.

=== 1960s-1970s ===
The "great revolutionary movement" of scientific experimentation was encouraged in rural China during the 1960s and 1970s. Millions of people in rural China, especially sent-down youth, participated in the scientific movement. In 1965, there were more than 400,000 rural scientific experimentation groups (nongcun kexue shiyan xiaozu 农村科学实验小组) nationwide to promote new agricultural technology and methods.

=== Post-Mao Zedong era ===
Beginning in the mid-1970s, inexpensive mass-produced goods began to enter rural villages.

Under Deng Xiaoping, urbanization in China has expanded at an unprecedented speed since the declaration of "Reform and Open Policy". The increased market forces resulted in social changes, including those resulting from the end of the Household Responsibility System and the increase in non-agriculture entrepreneurship in the 1980s. According to sociologist Yanfei Sun, the opportunities and pressures of new market forces resulted in rural communities "becom[ing] much less cohesive. In the process, the individualist orientation and materialist pursuits of villagers were reinforced."

In the middle 1980s, labor migration from rural to urban areas became a national phenomenon. It accelerated particularly in the beginning of the 1990s as the expanding non-state economy, new industrial parks increased the demand for urban labor, and the state relaxed some controls on rural to urban migration.

Between 1978 and 1999, an estimated 174 million people migrated from China's rural areas to its urban areas.

New policies in China's economy shifted the approach from collective farming to household-based production quotas, in many ways reversing decades of collectivization efforts. In many areas of China, especially southern and coastal China, the standard of living improved dramatically after Deng's reforms. Township and Village Enterprises brought industrial production to rural areas—predominantly along the southern coasts, helping open these rural communities to greater economic prosperity. (The idea of industrial production in rural areas had been attempted under Mao but with much more limited success; for instance, industrial plants in highly remote areas found their ultimate production efforts hampered.) Soon, however, an imbalance appeared where northern, interior, and western China remained at a far lower degree of economic development, a situation which persists to the twenty-first century. However, there are multiple, complex factors contributing to this state of affairs. For instance, distances are much greater, and geography often more challenging in western and interior regions. Population is more spread out; social structures may also play a role, in that the demographics and social structures of these regions often differ significantly from those of coastal China.

Deng Xiaoping's reforms included the introduction of planned, centralized management of the macro-economy by technically proficient bureaucrats, abandoning Mao's mass campaign style of economic construction. Deng sustained Mao's legacy to the extent that he stressed the primacy of agricultural output and encouraged a significant decentralization of decision making in the rural economy teams and individual peasant households. At the local level, material incentives, rather than political appeals, were to be used to motivate the labor force, including allowing peasants to earn extra income by selling the produce of their private plots at free market.

Rural markets selling peasants' homegrown products and the surplus products of communes were revived under the more free-market economic approach of Deng. Not only did rural markets increase agricultural output, they stimulated industrial development as well. With peasants able to sell surplus agricultural yields on the open market, domestic consumption stimulated industrialization as well and also created political support for more difficult economic reforms.

Economic development remains uneven. High-growth regions outpace impoverished areas, where low-income families often struggle to afford schooling despite low tuition fees. These compounding educational and social disparities remain a defining feature of regional inequality.

Lack of employment opportunities has increasingly made life in many rural regions difficult, hence the apparent enticement to resettle in urban areas. Of course, jobs are still limited, so many do relocate in cities only to find prospects much more meager than they had expected. Statistics suggest a very high proportion of residents of rural areas are unemployed or underemployed.

The development of Special Economic Zones also spurred rural growth in some parts of China.

An important policy document of the Xi Jinping era, 2013's Decision on Major Issues Concerning Comprehensively Deepening Reforms, described the urban-rural divide as a main obstacle to China's continued modernization and stated that efforts should be made to further integrate development. A series of projects designed to decrease the urban-rural divide followed.

In 2013, China announced a new plan to reduce poverty and develop impoverished rural regions by raising rural farmers' income growth and reducing obstacles in agricultural development. The plan includes the promotion of new types of agricultural businesses, such as family farms and organized cooperatives, and encouraging industrial and commercial enterprises to invest in agriculture.

== Collectivization and class status ==
The first major action to alter village society was the land reform of the late 1940s and early 1950s, in which the party sent work teams to every village to carry out its land reform policy. This in itself was an unprecedented display of administrative and political power. The land reform had several related goals. The work teams were to redistribute some (though not all) land from the wealthier families or land-owning trusts to the poorest segments of the population and so to effect a more equitable distribution of the basic means of production; to overthrow the village elites, who might be expected to oppose the party and its programs; to recruit new village leaders from among those who demonstrated the most commitment to the party's goals; and to teach everyone to think in terms of class status rather than kinship group or patron-client ties.

In pursuit of the last goal, the party work teams convened extensive series of meetings, and they classified all the village families either as landlords, rich peasants, middle peasants, or poor peasants. These labels, based on family landholdings and overall economic position roughly between 1945 and 1950, became a permanent and hereditary part of every family's identity and, as late as 1980, still affected, for example, such things as chances for admission to the armed forces, colleges, universities, and local administrative posts and even marriage prospects.

The collectivization of agriculture was essentially completed with the establishment of the people's communes in 1958. Communes were large, embracing scores of villages. They were intended to be multipurpose organizations, combining economic and local administrative functions. Under the commune system the household remained the basic unit of consumption, and some differences in standards of living remained, although they were not as marked as they had been before land reform. Under such a system, however, upward mobility required becoming a team or commune cadre or obtaining a scarce technical position such as a being a truck driver.

== Decollectivization ==
Collectivization and other political processes led to widespread famine and tens of millions of deaths. In the late 1970s, administrators in provincial-level units with extensive regions of low yields and consequent low standards of living began experimenting with new forms of tenure and production. In most cases, these took the form of breaking up the collective production team, contracting with individual households to work assigned portions of collective land, and expanding the variety of crops or livestock that could be produced. The experiments were deemed successful and popular, and they soon spread to all districts. By the winter of 1982–1983, the people's communes were abolished; they were replaced by administrative townships and a number of specialized teams or businesses that often leased such collective assets as tractors and provided services for money.

The agricultural reforms of the early 1980s led to a confusingly large number of new production arrangements and contracts. Underlying the variability of administrative and contractual forms were several basic principles and trends. In the first place, land, the fundamental means of production, remained collective property. It was leased, allocated, or contracted to individual households, but the households did not own the land and could not transfer it to other households. The household became, in most cases, the basic economic unit and was responsible for its own production and losses. Most economic activity was arranged through contracts, which typically secured promises to provide a certain amount of a commodity or sum of money to the township government in return for the use of land, or workshops, or tractors.

The goal of the contracting system was to increase efficiency in the use of resources and to tap peasant initiative. The rigid requirement that all villages produce grain was replaced by recognition of the advantages of specialization and exchange, as well as a much greater role for markets. Some "specialized households" devoted themselves entirely to production of cash crops or provision of services and reaped large rewards. The overall picture was one of increasing specialization, differentiation, and exchange in the rural economy and in society in general. Rural incomes increased rapidly, in part because the state substantially increased the prices it paid for staple crops and in part because of economic growth stimulated by the expansion of markets and the rediscovery of comparative advantage.

== Role of the household ==
Decollectivization increased the options available to individual households and made household heads increasingly responsible for the economic success of their households. In 1987, for example, it was legally possible to leave the village and move into a nearby town to work in a small factory, open a noodle stand, or set up a machine repair business. Farmers, however, still could not legally move into medium-sized or large cities. The Chinese press reported an increased appreciation in the countryside for education and an increased desire for agriculturally oriented newspapers and journals, as well as clearly written manuals on such profitable trades as rabbit-raising and beekeeping. As specialization and division of labor increased, along with increasingly visible differences in income and living standards, it became more difficult to encompass most of the rural population in a few large categories. During the early 1980s, the pace of economic and social change in rural China was rapid, and the people caught up in the change had difficulty making sense of the process.

== Consequences of rural reform ==
The state retained both its powers and its role in the rural economy in the 1980s. Decollectivization, like the collectivization of the 1950s, was directed from the top down. Sometimes, apparently, it was imposed on communities that had been content with their collective methods. But in permitting households and communities greater leeway to decide what to produce and in allowing the growth of rural markets and small-scale industries, the state stepped back from the close supervision and mandatory quotas of the 1960s and 1970s.

Decollectivization obviated the supervisory functions of low-level cadres, who no longer needed to oversee work on the collective fields. Some cadres became full-time administrators in township offices, and others took advantage of the reforms by establishing specialized production households or by leasing collective property at favorable rates. Former cadres, with their networks of connections and familiarity with administrative procedures, were in a better position than ordinary farmers to take advantage of the opportunities offered by the growth of markets and commercial activity. Even those cadres not wholly devoted to increasing their own families' income found that to serve their fellow villagers as expected it was necessary to act as entrepreneurs. Village-level cadres in the mid-1980s were functioning less as overseers and more as extension agents and marketing consultants.

By 1987 rural society was more open and diverse than in the 1960s and 1970s, and the rigid collective units of that period, which had reflected the state's overwhelming concern for security, had been replaced by networks and clusters of smaller units. The new, looser structure demonstrated the priority placed on efficiency and economic growth. Basic security, in the sense of an adequate supply of food and guarantees of support for the disabled, orphaned, or aged, was taken for granted. Less than half of China's population remembered the insecurity and risks of pre-1950 society, but the costs and inefficiencies of the collective system were fresh in their minds. Increased specialization and division of labor were trends not likely to be reversed. In the rural areas the significance of the work unit appeared to have diminished, although people still lived in villages, and the actions of low-level administrative cadres still affected ordinary farmers or petty traders in immediate ways.

The state and its officials still dominated the economy, controlled supplies of essential goods, taxed and regulated businesses and markets, and awarded contracts. The stratification system of the Maoist period had been based on a hierarchy of functionally unspecialized cadres directing the labors of a fairly uniform mass of peasants. It was replaced in the 1980s by a new elite of economically specialized households and entrepreneurs who had managed to come to terms with the administrative cadres who controlled access to many of the resources necessary for economic success. Local cadres still had the power to impose fees, taxes, and all manner of exactions. The norms of the new system were not clear, and the economic and social system continued to change in response to the rapid growth of rural commerce and industry and to national economic policies and reforms.

== Regulations and favors ==
Increased commercial activity produced a high degree of normative ambiguity, especially in areas like central Guangdong and Jiangsu provinces, where rural economic growth was fastest. Neither the proper role of local officials nor the rights and obligations of new entrepreneurs or traders were clear. The line between the normal use of personal contacts and hospitality and extraordinary and criminal favoritism and corruption was ambiguous. There were hints of the development of a system of patron-client ties, in which administrative cadres granted favors to ordinary farmers in return for support, esteem, and an occasional gift. The increased number of corruption cases reported in the Chinese press and the widespread assumption that the decollectivization and rural economic reforms had led to growing corruption probably reflected both the increased opportunities for deals and favors of all sorts and the ambiguous nature of many of the transactions and relationships. The party's repeated calls for improved socialist spiritual civilization and the attempts of the central authorities both to create a system of civil law and to foster respect for it can be interpreted as responses to the problem. On the local level, where cadres and entrepreneurs were engaged in constant negotiation on the rules of their game, the problem was presumably being addressed in a more straightforward fashion.

Hu Jintao sought to reduce urban-rural inequalities through the campaign to build a "New Socialist Countryside".

== Family and household ==
In past Chinese society, the family provided every individual's support, livelihood, and long-term security. Today the state guarantees such security to those with no families to provide for them, and families and work units share long-term responsibility for the individual. The role of families has changed, but they remain important, especially in the countryside. Family members are bound, in law and custom, to support their aged or disabled members. The state, acting through work units, provides support and benefits only when families cannot. Households routinely pool income, and any individual's standard of living depends on the number of household wage earners and the number of dependents. In both cities and villages, the highest incomes usually are earned by households with several wage earners, such as unmarried adult sons or daughters.

In late traditional society, family size and structural complexity varied directly with class. Rural landlords and government officials had the largest families, poor peasants the smallest. The poorest segment of the population, landless laborers, could not afford to marry and start families. The need to provide for old age and the general association between the numbers of sons surviving to adulthood and long-term family success motivated individuals to create various non-standard family forms. Couples who produced no sons, or no children at all, adopted or purchased infants outright. Families with daughters but no sons tried to find men willing to marry their daughters and move into their families, abandoning their original families and sometimes even their original surnames. Families with daughters but no property to attract a son-in-law were sometimes forced to sell their daughters as concubines or prostitutes. The variation in family size and complexity was the result of variation in class position and of the dual role of the household as both family and economic enterprise.

From the 1950s onwards, China sought to pursue gender equality by including women in the formal labor force. In urban areas, this process was facilitated by the development of a network of public nurseries, daycare centers, and kindergartens. In rural areas, working mothers obtained support from mothers-in-law and other extended family members, usually on the father's side. By the mid-1970s, the extended family on the father's side was the most important safety net for rural child care. The work of childcare was primarily associated with women, particularly mothers-in-law who exercised significant authority.

In contemporary society, rural families no longer own land or pass it down to the next generation. They may, however, own and transmit houses. Rural families pay medical expenses and school fees for their children. Under the people's commune system in force from 1958 to 1982, the income of a peasant family depended directly on the number of laborers it contributed to the collective fields. This, combined with concern over the level of support for the aged or disabled provided by the collective unit, encouraged peasants to have many sons. Under the agricultural reforms that began in the late 1970s, households took on an increased and more responsible economic role. The labor of family members is still the primary determinant of income. But rural economic growth and commercialization increasingly have rewarded managerial and technical skills and have made unskilled farm labor less desirable. As long as this economic trend continues in the countryside in the late 1980s, peasant families are likely to opt for fewer but better educated children.

The consequence of the general changes in China's economy and the greater separation of families and economic enterprises has been a greater standardization of family forms since 1950. In 1987 most families approximated the middle peasant (a peasant owning some land) norm of the past. Such a family consisted of five or six people and was based on marriage between an adult son and an adult woman who moved into her husband's family. The variant family forms - either the very large and complex or those based on minor, nonstandard forms of marriage - were much less common. The state had outlawed concubinage, child betrothal, and the sale of infants or females, all of which were formerly practiced, though not common. Increased life expectancy meant that a greater proportion of infants survived to adulthood and that more adults lived into their sixties or seventies. More rural families were able to achieve the traditional goal of a three-generation family in the 1980s. There were fewer orphans and young or middle-aged widows or widowers. Far fewer men were forced to retain lifelong single status. Divorce, although possible, was rare, and families were stable, on-going units.

A number of traditional attitudes toward the family have survived without being questioned. It is taken for granted that everyone should marry, and marriage remains part of the definition of normal adult status. Marriage is expected to be permanent. That marriage requires a woman to move into her husband's family and to become a daughter-in-law as well as a wife is still largely accepted. The norm of patrilineal descent and the assumption that it is sons who bear the primary responsibility for their aged parents remain. The party and government have devoted great effort to controlling the number of births and have attempted to limit the number of children per couple. But the authorities have not attempted to control population growth by suggesting that some people should not marry at all.

In the past, kinship principles were extended beyond the domestic group and were used to form large-scale groups, such as lineages. Lineages were quite distinct from families; they were essentially corporate economic-political groups. They controlled land and, in some areas of China, dominated whole villages and sets of villages and held title to most of the farmland. Like most other late traditional associations, lineages were dominated by wealthy and educated elites. Ordinary peasants paid as much of their crop to their lineage group as they might have to a landlord. The Communists denounced these organizations as feudal systems by means of which landlords exploited others. The lineages were suppressed in the early 1950s and their land confiscated and redistributed in the land reform. Communal worship of distant lineage ancestors lost much of its justification with the dissolution of the lineage estate and was easily suppressed over the next several years. Domestic ancestor worship, in which members of a single family worshiped and memorialized their immediate ancestors, continued at least until 1966 and 1967, in the early stages of the Cultural Revolution, when Red Guards destroyed altars and ancestral tablets. In 1987 the party was still condemning ancestor worship as superstitious but had made little effort to end it.

== Marriage ==
Before the founding of the People's Republic of China in 1949, marriage in rural China was generally viewed as a practical matter, transacted between two families with the involvement of a matchmaker, and geared towards reproducing the patriline. In many rural areas, the family continued to be viewed through the Confucian idea of Three Obediences and Four Virtues, through which the subject was loyal to the ruler, the son was loyal to the father, and the wife was loyal to the husband. After the 1912 founding of the Republic of China, an increase in free-choice marriage occurred, but these trends were largely limited to urban areas and considerations of matchmaking, social status, and wealth continued to be major considerations in rural marriages.

The New Marriage Law of 1950 sought to replace the traditional practice with free-choice marriage based on equal rights for women. It sought to abolish practices deemed as feudal abuses like bigamy, arranged marriages, concubinage, bigamy, infanticide, interfering with a widow's choice to re-marry, and the practice of taking in a foster daughter-in-law for future marriage to a son (童养媳 tongyangxi). The law provided women with the right to initiate divorce and to hold property in their own name.

Initially, the New Marriage Law faced significant opposition in rural China.

Rural China offered little privacy for courtship, and in villages there was little public tolerance for flirting or even extended conversation between unmarried men and women. Introductions and go-betweens continued to play a major role in the arrangement of marriages. In most cases each of the young people, and their parents, had an effective veto over any proposed match.

In the past, marriage was seen as the concern of families as well as of the two parties to the match. Families united by marriage were expected to be of equivalent status, or the groom's family to be of somewhat higher status. This aspect of marriage patterns has continued while the definitions of status have changed. Because inherited wealth was eliminated as a significant factor, evaluation had been shifted to estimates of earning power and future prosperity. The most desirable husbands have been administrative cadres, party members, and employees of large state enterprises. Conversely, men from poor villages have had difficulty finding wives. From the early 1950s to the late 1970s, when hereditary class labels were very significant, anyone with a "counter-revolutionary" background, that is, anyone previously identified with the landlord or even rich peasant class, was a bad prospect for marriage. Such pariahs often had no choice but to marry the offspring of other families with "bad" class backgrounds. At the other end of the social scale, there appeared to be a high level of intermarriage among the children of high-level cadres.

== Community structure ==
Most rural Chinese has lived in one of some 900,000 villages, which have an average population of from 1,000 to 2,000 people. Villages have never been self-contained, self-sufficient units, and the social world of Chinese peasants has extended beyond their home villages. Almost all new wives come into a village from other settlements, and daughters marry out. All villagers have close kinship ties with families in other villages, and marriage go-betweens shuttle from village to village.

Before 1950 clusters of villages centered on small market towns that linked them to the wider economy and society. Most peasants were only a few hours' walk or less from a market town, which provided not only opportunities to buy and sell but also opportunities for entertainment, information, social life, and a host of specialized services. The villages around a market formed a social unit that, although less immediately visible than the villages, was equally significant.

From the early 1950s on, China's revolutionary government made great efforts to put the state and its ideology into direct contact with the villages and to sweep aside the intermediaries and brokers who had traditionally interpreted central policies and national values for villagers. The state and the party were generally successful, establishing unprecedented degrees of political and ideological integration of villages into the state and of village-level awareness of state policies and political goals.

The unintended consequence of the economic and political policies of the 1950s and 1960s was to increase the closed, corporate quality of China's villages and to narrow the social horizons of villagers. Land reform and the reorganization of villages as subunits of people's communes meant that villages became collective landholding units and had clear boundaries between their lands and those of adjacent villages. Central direction of labor on collective fields made the former practices of swapping labor between villages impossible. The household registration and rationing systems confined villagers to their home settlements and made it impossible for them to seek their fortune elsewhere. Cooperation with fellow villagers and good relations with village leaders became even more important than they had been in the past. The suppression of rural markets, which accompanied the drive for self-sufficiency in grain production and other economic activities, had severe social as well as economic consequences. Most peasants had neither reason nor opportunity for regular trips to town, and their opportunities for exchange and cooperation with residents of other villages were diminished. Villages became work units, with all that that implied.

Decollectivization in the early 1980s resulted in the revival of rural marketing, and a limited relaxation of controls on out-migration opened villages and diminished the social boundaries around them. The social world of peasants expanded, and the larger marketing community took on more significance as that of the village proper was diminished. Village membership, once the single most important determinant of an individual's circumstances, became only one of a number of significant factors, which also included occupation, personal connections, and managerial talent.

== Healthcare ==
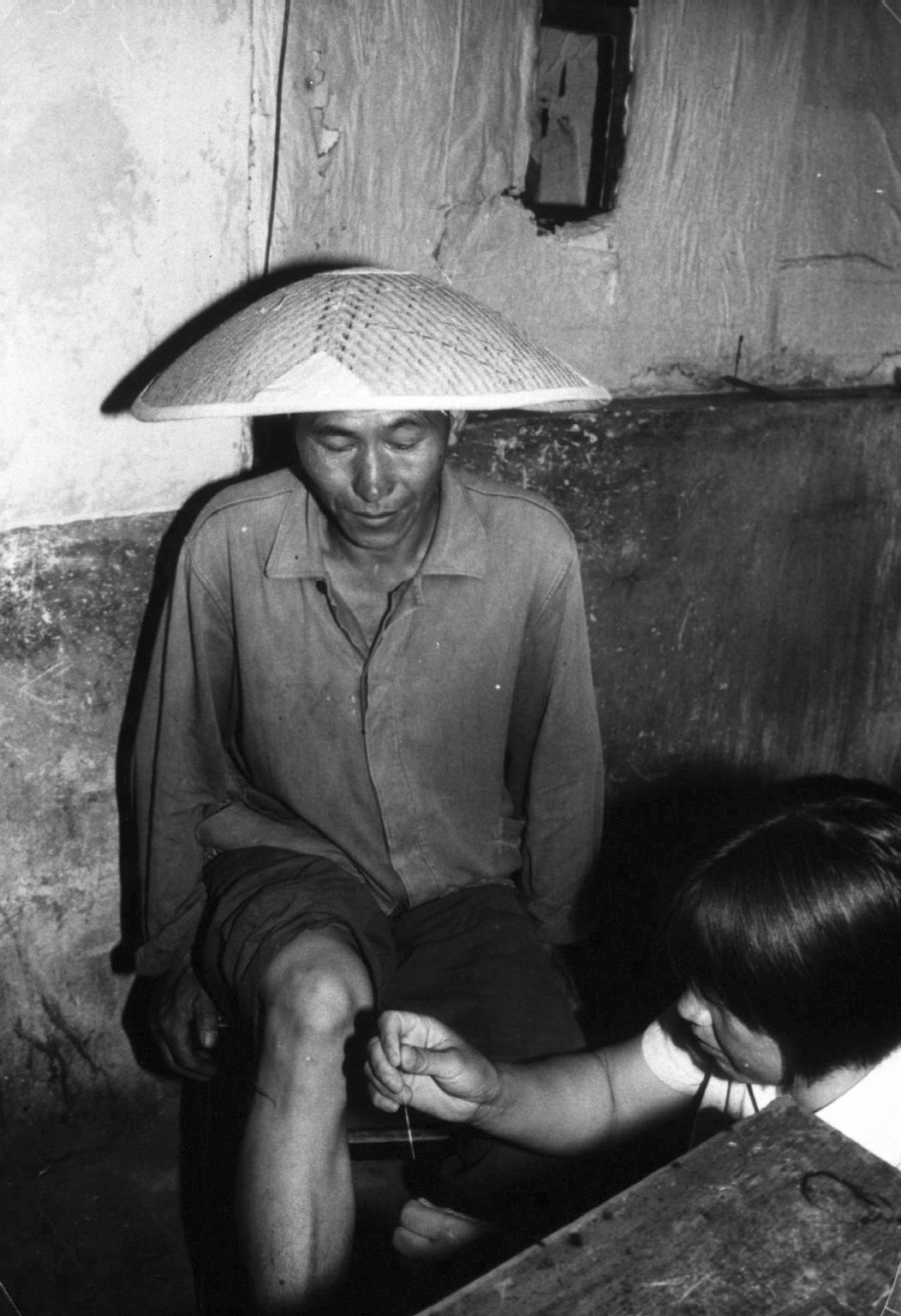
Chinese barefoot doctor using acupuncture to treat a production brigade worker

After 1949, the Chinese healthcare system, in rural areas the first tier was made up of "barefoot doctors" working out of village medical centers. They provided preventive and primary-care services, with an average of two doctors per 1,000 people. The barefoot doctors emerged in 1968 when China lacked qualified health workers in rural areas and in 1985, China stopped using the term of barefoot doctor. Most of them were transferred to village doctors as private practitioners, making a living out of drug sales based on user fees. At the next level were the township health centers, which functioned primarily as out-patient clinics for about 10,000 to 30,000 people each. These centers had about ten to thirty beds each, and the most qualified members of the staff were assistant doctors. The two lower-level tiers made up the "rural collective health system" that provided most of the country's medical care. Only the most seriously ill patients were referred to the third and final tier, the county hospitals, which served 200,000 to 600,000 people each and were staffed by senior doctors who held degrees from 5-year medical schools.

In the late 20th and early 21st century, the availability and quality of health care varied widely from city to countryside. According to 1982 census data, in rural areas the crude death rate was 1.6 per 1,000 higher than in urban areas, and life expectancy was about 4 years lower. The number of senior physicians per 1,000 population was about 10 times greater in urban areas than in rural ones; state expenditure on medical care was more than -Y26 per capita in urban areas and less than -Y3 per capita in rural areas. There were also about twice as many hospital beds in urban areas as in rural areas. These are aggregate figures, however, and certain rural areas had much better medical care and nutritional levels than others.

== Village life and expressive culture ==
Traditional Chinese village life focused on agricultural, ritual, and festival activities based closely on seasonal and environmental requirements. Early Western studies of Chinese village life dealt with villages in Hong Kong or Taiwan as mainland China was not accessible to Western scholars at that time. For a useful compendium of studies on the Hong Kong New Territories see James L. Watson and Rubie S. Watson (2004), which comprises studies based on fieldwork carried out from 1969 to 1997. For studies of village life in Taiwan see Seaman (1978), and Ahern and Gates (1981). In the 1980s and 1990s it became possible to undertake fieldwork in mainland China. Anthropologists working in the mainland noticed the revival of pre-1949 religious and festival practices throughout rural China in the post-Mao era.

During the 1980s and 1990s, the diversity of religious practice in rural China increased, including state-sanctioned churches, mosques, Buddhist temples, and folk religious practice. In the 1980s, the number of Protestants in rural China increased rapidly.

Funerals in rural villages can last for days and include thousands of people and complex funeral rituals.

Thomas David DuBois investigated village life in Cang County, Hebei, from 1997 to 2002. According to DuBois: "What has remained constant is that religion continues to permeate all aspects of life in rural North China," (DuBois 2005, p. 2).

Thousands of temples were rebuilt at village and county level in the reform era (post 1978). Temples provide entertainment and festival occasions as well as religious activity. According to Adam Yuet Chau, who studied the Dragon King Temple in rural Shaanbei in north China, the temple was the focus of entertainments such as folk operas, dance troupes, storytellers, and musicians (Chao, 2006, p. 242). He argues further that "Temple associations…have played an important role in expanding folk cultural space and the agrarian public sphere in contemporary China" (Chau, 2006, 242) Temple activities promote good community relations and offer assurance of mutual help in time of need (Chau, Miraculous Response, 144). For studies of the role of temples in the revival of Taoist sacrifices in Fujian see Dean (1993). He notes the importance of temples in the economic, political, and social life of the village (Dean,1993, 17). David Johnson has studied the close relationship between village temple opera and territorial units known as shȇ (Johnson 2009). He claims that village-level communal rituals were "the highest expression of the values and beliefs of ordinary people" (Johnson 2009, 10).

In the contemporary era (post 1978), village administrators, including communist party officials, can be very involved in the running of village temple activities (Tsai 2007, 140). However, other aspects of village culture, such as the performances of itinerant folk musicians, are subject to minimal regulation by the state (Jones 2009, xxi). Folk musicians carry out ritual roles as well as provide entertainment. Jones distinguishes between the "institutional" role of temple Buddhist and Daoist monks and the more "diffused" activities of lay Buddhist and Daoist ritual practitioners, many of whom are "ordinary peasants performing for life-cycle and calendrical ceremonies" (Jones, 2009, xxi). Very talented rural singers may be able to adapt their repertoire to attract both elite and popular audiences (Gibbs 2018). In border areas, informal and often hidden song traditions help bolster ethnic identities. For a study of the revival of the song and storytelling traditions of the Tai Lüe people of Sipsongpanna, Yunnan, see Davis (2005).

Village ritual, expressive culture, and festival activities reflect the villagers' struggle with their local environment. In southern rice-growing regions, which require intensive irrigation, both drought and floods can be a problem. The famous Chinese anthropologist, Fei Xiaotong, investigated village life in the Lower Yangzi Delta region in the 1920s. He observed that the villagers enacted religious ceremonies and rituals at times of drought, floods, and locusts (Fei, 2010, 134). For a comprehensive study of the ritual and expressive culture associated with rice growing in the Lower Yangzi Delta region see Jiang Bin (1996). Rice cultivators along the shores of Lake Tai in Jiangsu province believed that "the rice-seedling transformed from a young girl, to a pregnant wife, and finally to a Rice Mother bearing child-grains," (McLaren, 2022, xviii). Lake Tai songs and stories include tales of a local hero who brought back the art of rice growing from a paradisial land to his home village (McLaren, 2022, 77–110). The songs of the Kam people of Guizhou reflect local "environmental management and agricultural practices" in this rice-cultivation zone (Ingram 2011, 445). Ingram observes that these instructional songs "complement and assist in retaining longstanding farming techniques" (Ingram 2011, 446). Drought is a serious problem for villagers living in the region of the Yellow River. The Dragon King is venerated because he can dispense rain and save the community from drought (Chau, 2006, 79). The ritual operas of Aoshi in Shanxi were performed "to bring rain during droughts, to drive away disease, and to prevent fires, as well as to celebrate the New Year" (Johnson 2009, 71–72).

The resurgence of popular folk practices and beliefs after 1980 was largely due to the lack of economic advances in most of rural China during the period of high socialism. As Stephen Jones points out, "In Shaanbei, as elsewhere in China, one may partly relate the persistence of pre-Communist belief systems (like worship of the gods and ceremonial practices) throughout these periods to the inability of modern governments to transform the environment. The largely agrarian society has remained poor and partially dependent on divine blessing, even since the 1980s when some parts of the area made clear economic progress." (Jones, 2009, xix-xx).

=== Film ===
At the PRC's founding in 1949, there were less than 600 movie theatres in the country. Projectionists traveled through rural China showing films, a process modeled on the Soviet Union's use of mobile film teams to spread revolutionary culture. Rural mobile projectionist teams and urban movie theaters were generally managed through the PRC's cultural bureaucracy. Until the 1990s, the vast majority of people in China lived in rural areas, and therefore did not encounter film until mobile projectionists brought them in the 1950s and 1960s.

== Telecommunications and internet ==
In 2004, the Ministry of Industry and Information Technology began the Connecting Every Village Project to promote universal access to telecommunication and internet services in rural China. The MIIT required that six state-owned companies, including the main telecommunications and internet providers China Mobile, China Unicom, and China Telecom, build the communications infrastructure and assist in financing the project. By 2010, nearly every administrative village was connected to phone systems. As of December 2019, 135 million rural households had used broadband internet. The program successfully extended internet infrastructure throughout rural China and promoted development of the internet.

The expansion of e-commerce in China has resulted in the development of Taobao villages, clusters of e-commerce businesses operating in rural areas. The terminology of "Taobao villages" first became popular in the media in 2009 and subsequently has been officially defined as an administrative village in which at least 10% of households work in e-commerce and have total annual sales of more than 10 million RMB. Because Taobao villages have increased the incomes of rural people and entrepreneurship in rural China, Taobao villages have become a component of rural revitalization strategies.

In 2014, the Chinese government and Alibaba partnered to create the rural e-commerce expansion program Rural Taobao, which aimed to provide rural households with the same level of access to consumer goods that urban residents have and to facilitate the sale of agricultural goods through e-commerce. As of 2017, the program covered 16,500 villages.

In 2015, the Ministry of Finance allocated 2 billion RMB to establish e-commerce centers in some of the least developed areas of China. This approach has since inspired similar strategies in Egypt, India, and Vietnam.

A 2015-2017 study by Liu et al. focusing on short to medium term e-commerce impacts in rural China concluded that e-commerce resulted in gains for the average rural household, primarily through consumption benefits. Consumption benefits included particularly pronounced price decreases for durable goods like appliances and electronics. The study showed that e-commerce improves the sale of consumer goods and agricultural/business inputs into rural areas. It also has some production benefits by helping rural households sell products outside of their communities thereby raising rural household income levels.

== See also ==
- Hukou - system of household registration used in mainland China
- Ten-star household
- Urban society in the People's Republic of China
- Women's healthcare in the People's Republic of China
- Wokai - Organization that connects contributors worldwide with micro-entrepreneurs in rural China to help them start small businesses

== Bibliography ==
- Yang, Dali. Calamity and Reform in China: State, Rural Society and Institutional Change since the Great Leap Famine. Stanford University Press, 1996. ISBN 9780804734707
