= Ten-star household =

Status awarded to households in rural China

Ten-star household (Mandarin Chinese: 十星文明户; Hanyu Pinyin: Shíxīng Wénmíng Hù) is an activity initiated by the Central Committee of the Chinese Communist Party, involving the awarding of the status of "ten-star household" to households in multiple regions of rural China since 2008. It is rewarded to rural households that exemplify the government's stated "Core Socialist Values" symbolically, through a standardized criterion of 10 requirements. Households are nominated by local villagers, and preliminary review and evaluation will be conducted by grassroots CCP organizations. The final decisions are then made by the villagers' committee.

== Background ==
The implementation of the Ten-Star household was closely associated with the leadership of Hu Jintao, who served as General Secretary of the Chinese Communist Party from 2002 to 2012.

== Selection criteria ==
Households are awarded the status based on a criterion of 10 requirements. They are awarded 'one star' for fulfilling each requirement:

1. Patriotic Star (爱国星): Love the Party and the country, care about collective Chinese society. Establishing values based on the Chinese Core Socialist Values, while promoting rural reform, development, and stability, and participating in various village meetings and public welfare activities.
2. Education Star (教育星): Have a focus on education and improve social conduct. Participate in rural cultural development, ensure that all adults under 40 in the family are literate, and that all children complete nine years of compulsory education without dropping out. Subscribe to at least one Party newspaper or periodical publication.
3. Science and Technology Star (科技星): Practice scientific methods during production, and achieve prosperity through hard work. Master one or two agricultural techniques, do not abandon cropland, and achieve a per capita net income that is at least 30% higher than the village household average. Take the lead in promoting new technologies and new varieties and achieving tangible results.
4. Law and Discipline Star (法纪星): Learn and apply the law, abide by rules and regulations of China. Do not engage in pornography, gambling, or drug abuse; do not steal, fight, gather in large groups to cause disturbances, or bribe higher authorities; do not illegally occupy, seize, or exceed the designated area of residential land, or evade taxes.
5. Harmony Star (和笑星): Live in a harmonious family unit that is united as one with neighbours. Emphasise the cultivation of family virtues, such as supporting the elderly, respecting the elderly and cherish the young, and building equal, friendly, and harmonious families and neighbourhoods.
6. Marriage and Childbearing Star (婚育星): Late marriage and late childbearing, and practice family planning. In accordance to the Marriage Law and the Family Planning Law, refrain from consanguineous marriage, arranged marriages, illegal adoptions, or excessive births/harbouring children after exceeding the legal limit.
7. "New Wave" Star (新风星): Dispel traditional superstition and change traditional cultural customs. Oppose superstitions – do not believe in, participate in, or spread them. Uphold the practice of simple wedding and funeral ceremonies, avoid witchcraft, fortune-telling, and spiritual practices, strengthen ethnic unity, and firmly stand against all cults and their behaviour.
8. Hygiene Star (卫生星): Protect the environment and maintain hygiene. Purify, brighten, and beautify courtyards, participate in washroom and kitchen renovations, plant trees in rural areas, maintain civilised and clean villages, and actively participate in the New Rural Cooperative Medical System.
9. Frugality Star (勤俭星): Work diligently and manage the household frugally. Be self-reliant, plan expenses rationally, avoid extravagance and wasteful behaviour, and avoid laziness and idleness.
10. Public Character Star (公德星): Helping others and allowing the countryside to benefit. Promote the new socialist spirit of helping others, actively support the military and their families, help the needy, conscientiously maintain public facilities, and protect collective property from loss.

== Rewards ==
Households that receive the status and fulfil loan requirements set are able to receive benefits. Rural cooperative financial institutions offer preferential loan procedures, loan amounts, terms, and interest rates to the rural citizens.

These households are also given priority benefits, such as priority in joining the party, the army, the Communist Youth League, medical care, experimental agricultural projects, and education.

Consideration for establishing bookstores, township cultural stations, cultural courtyards (文化大院), gymnasiums and other facilities is also first given for establishment at locations nearby ten-star households. The households are also appointed as managers of these facilities.
