= Double Star (disambiguation) =

Double Star is a novel by Robert Heinlein.

Double Star may also refer to:

- Double star, a pair of stars that appear close to each other in the sky
- Double Star (board game), a board wargame by Game Designers' Workshop
- Double Star Mission, a joint Chinese/European satellite effort
- Qingdao DoubleStar, a team in the Chinese Basketball Association

== See also ==
- Binary star
