= Qixingyan (Taiwan) =

Coral islands n Pingtung County, Taiwan

Coordinates: 21°45′31.98″N 120°49′28.94″E

Position of Qixingyan south of Taiwan

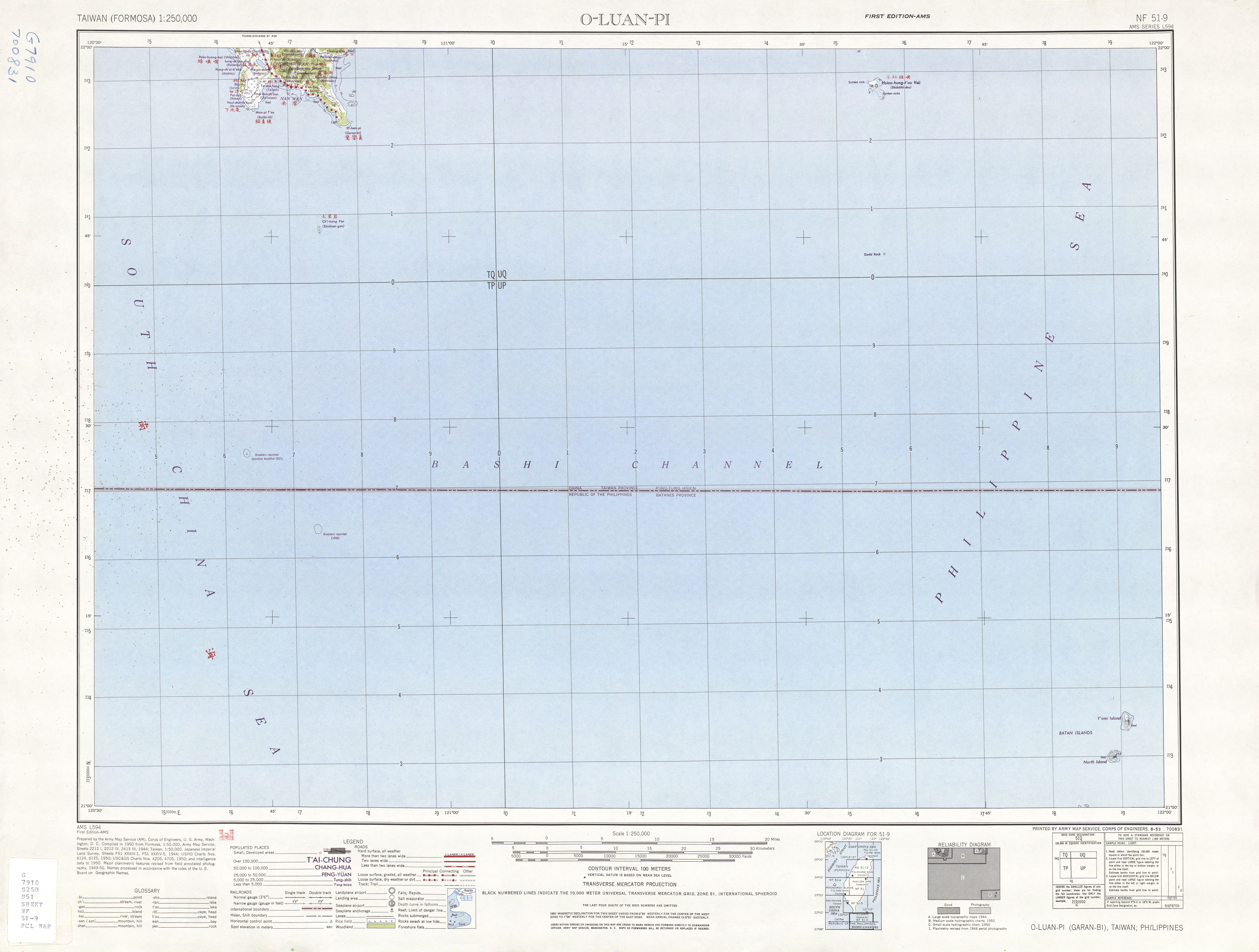
Qixingyan (labeled as Ch'i-hsing Yen (Shichisei-gan) Chinese: 七星岩; Pe̍h-ōe-jī: Chhit-chheⁿ-gâm) (1950)

Qixingyan or Ch'ihsingyen (Chinese: 七星岩; Pe̍h-ōe-jī: Chhit-chheⁿ-gâm; lit. 'Seven Star Reef'), also known as the Vele Rete rocks, is a group of coral islands in the Bashi Channel, located off the southern coast of Pingtung County, Taiwan. The island group is composed by seven coral reefs. At low tide seven reefs are visible. At high tide only two reefs are visible. Qixingyan is shaped like the Big Dipper, hence the name "Seven Star Reef". It is about 8 nautical miles (15 km) from the southernmost point of Taiwan, Eluanbi. Due to strong currents and shoals in the area, many ships were wrecked and lives lost in the early to mid-19th century after the Qing court opened trade between the West and China. Notable shipwrecks include the 1867 US merchant ship Rover that resulted in the Rover incident and the 1871 Japanese merchant vessel Ryukyu which resulted in the Mudan incident.

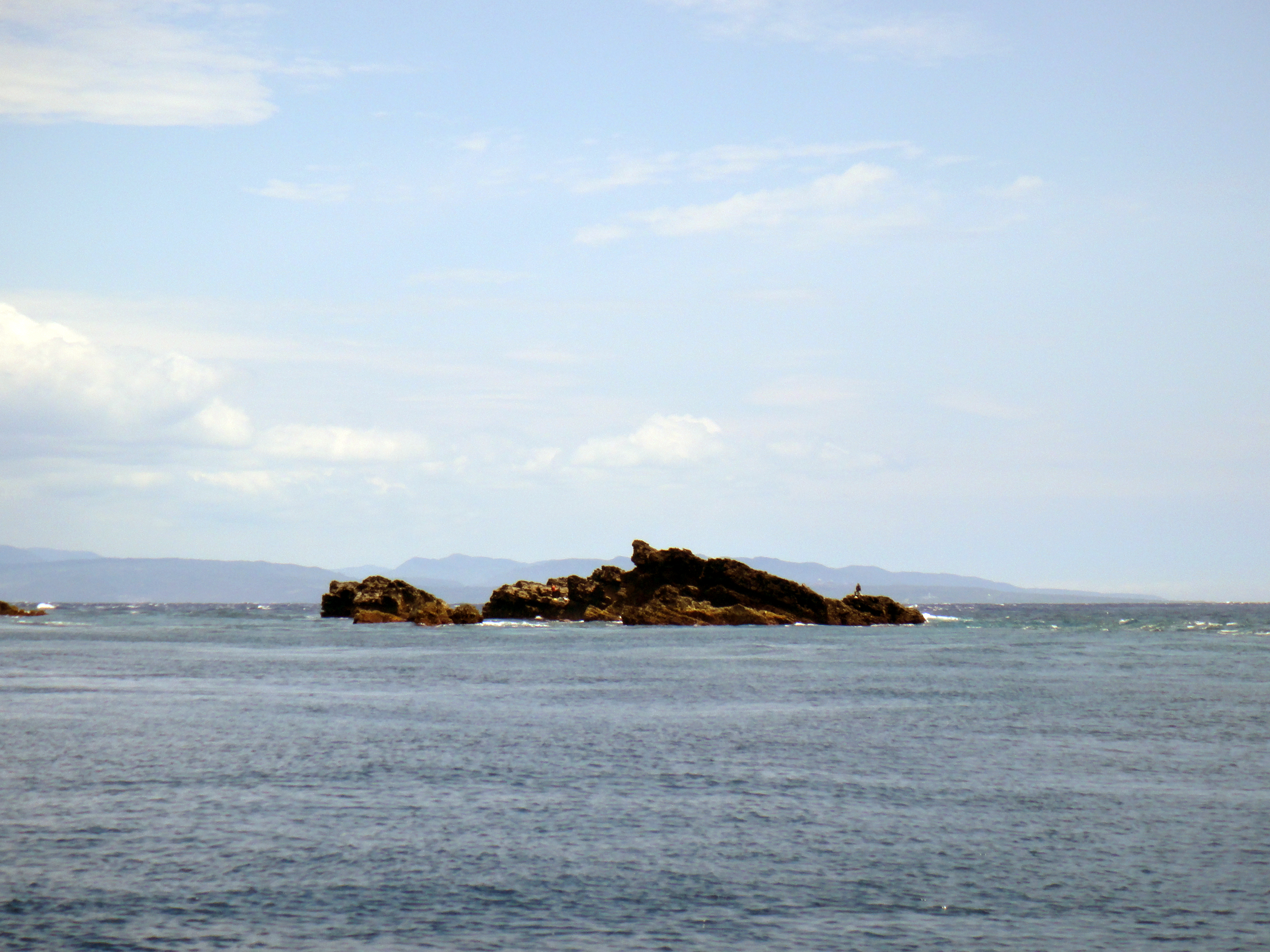
Qixingyan

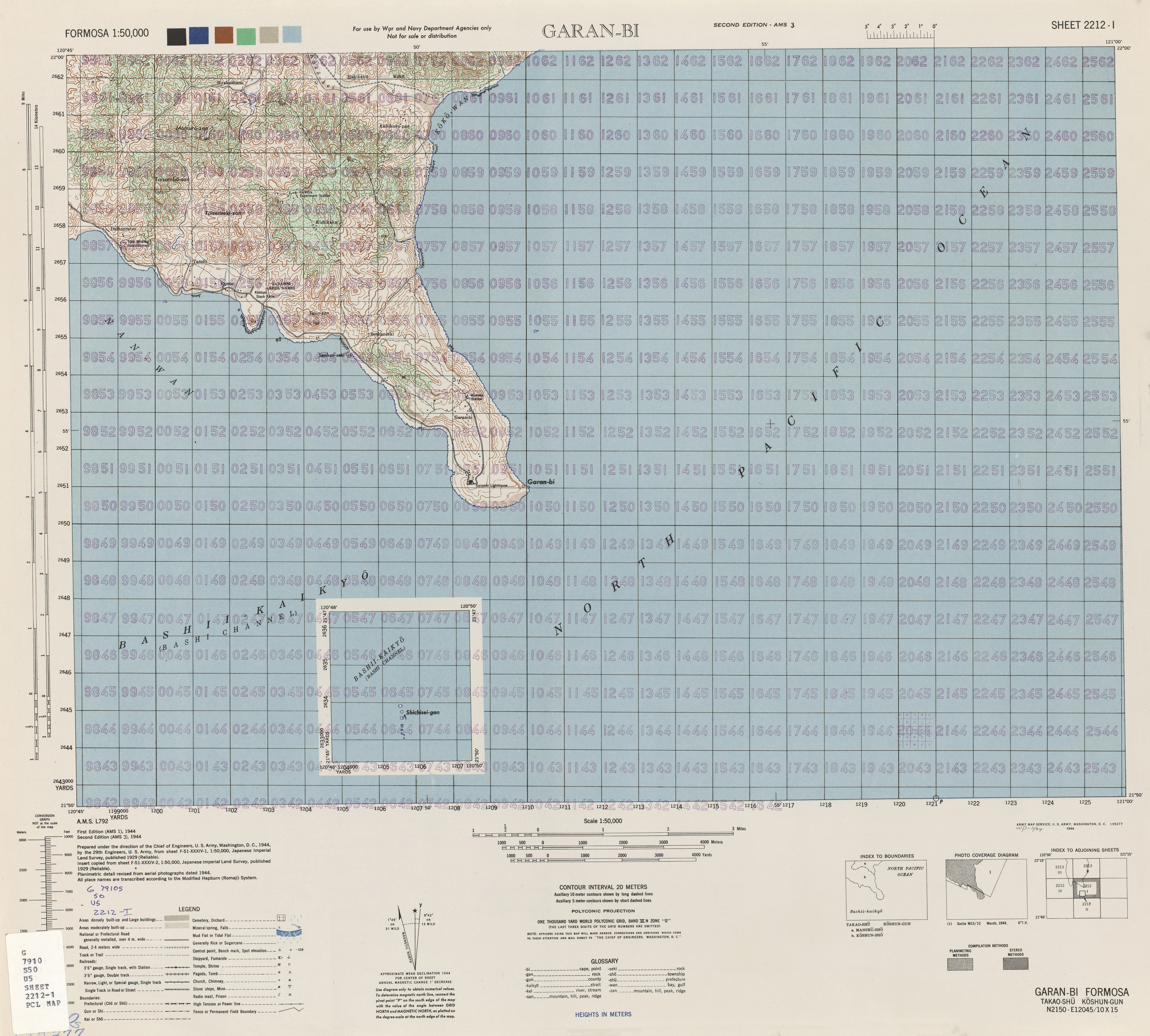
Map including Qixingyan (labeled as Shichisei-gan) (1944)

== See also ==
- Kenting National Park
- Eluanbi Lighthouse
- List of reefs
- List of Taiwanese superlatives
- List of islands of Taiwan
