= The Seven Stars, Falmouth =

Listed pub in Cornwall, England

The Seven Stars
- The pub in 2019

General information
- Type: Public house
- Location: 1 The Moor, Falmouth, Cornwall, England
- Coordinates: 50°09′18″N 5°04′23″W
- Year built: Late 17th century
- Renovated: 1912 (extended)
- Owner: Independent

Design and construction
- Designations

Listed Building – Grade II
- Official name: The Seven Stars public house
- Designated: 22 September 1971
- Reference no.: 1298802

Website
- thesevenstarsfalmouth.com

The Seven Stars is a Grade II listed public house on The Moor in Falmouth, Cornwall, England. It is claimed to have been established in 1660 and to be the town's oldest pub, although the present building has been variously dated to the late 17th century and around 1800. Its largely unaltered interior is included on the Campaign for Real Ale (CAMRA)'s National Inventory of Historic Pub Interiors and is rated three stars, denoting "outstanding national historic importance".

== History ==
The Seven Stars is claimed to have opened in 1660 and to be the oldest public house in Falmouth. However, the present building has been dated to the late 17th century, while the Campaign for Real Ale (CAMRA) suggests a date of around 1800.

The pub has remained in the same family's ownership since at least the late 19th century. It was extended in 1912, when an off-sales shop was added. After closing during the Second World War, the premises did not reopen as a pub until the late 1980s. The off-sales business later operated from the former shop and continued until 2006. For more than 50 years, the pub was run by the Reverend Barrington Bennetts, an Anglican clergyman, who remained behind the bar until his death in 2011.

On 22 September 1971, the Seven Stars was designated a Grade II listed building. It was included on CAMRA's National Inventory of Historic Pub Interiors before the inventory's grading system was revised. Under the revised scheme, it is rated three stars and its interior is regarded as being "of outstanding national historic importance". A 2015 review in The Telegraph mentioned that the public house had a dated feel, due to the style of the interiors, but that it was a "total treasure".

== Architecture ==
=== Exterior ===
The building is constructed of painted stone and rubble and consists of a three-storey main section linked to a lower two-storey wing, together forming a four-window frontage. The main section has a steep slate roof, while the lower wing is roofed with asbestos slates. Prominent chimney stacks rise from both parts of the building, including a large rendered stack beside the lower wing. Two original oak lintels survive at first-floor level in the main section.

The three-storey part of the frontage has a central entrance beneath a hood supported by brackets and is flanked by late 19th-century bay windows with angled sides and decorative cornices. Above are sash windows of the same period. The lower wing has an additional entrance beneath a smaller hood and retains earlier sash windows with multiple panes alongside later 19th-century examples. The building extends to the rear with further ranges, giving it a deeper plan than is apparent from the street.

=== Interior ===
The interior retains a largely unaltered two-room arrangement. The front public bar preserves a late Victorian bar counter, shelving and a wooden stillage dating from about 1898, with beer still served from casks behind the bar. Other notable features include a white marble counter associated with a former oyster bar, gas lighting, a tiled fireplace installed during the 1912 alterations, and fixed bench seating along the panelled walls. An entrance passage retains a door marked "Saloon Bar" decorated with seven blue stars, formerly positioned on the front of the building when the main bar was subdivided. To the rear, the former smoke room contains another 1912 tiled fireplace, large mirrors, a skylight, an off-sales hatch with sliding windows, and seating dating from the 1960s.
