= Irene Thirer =

American film critic and newspaper editor (1905–1964)

Irene Thirer (1905–1964) was an American film critic and newspaper editor.

== Biography ==
Born in London, Thirer moved to New York in 1910 and was educated at New York University and City College. She began her journalism career at The Daily News in 1921, initially as a picture-caption writer, and transitioned to film criticism in 1925. She was part of the team that developed the newspaper's star-rating system for film reviews.

In 1935, Thirer moved to The New York Post, where she continued to write film reviews and conduct interviews until her death in 1964. Her approach to film criticism was noted for its balance and thoughtfulness, distinguishing her work in an industry often known for its harsh critiques.

In 1955, Thirer became the vice chair of the New York Film Critics. In 1957, as chair of the New York Film Critics, she presented an award to Ingrid Bergman for the actress's role in Anastasia.
