= Seven Star Crags =

Scenic area in Zhaoqing, Guangdong, China

Coordinates: 23°04′21″N 112°28′05″E

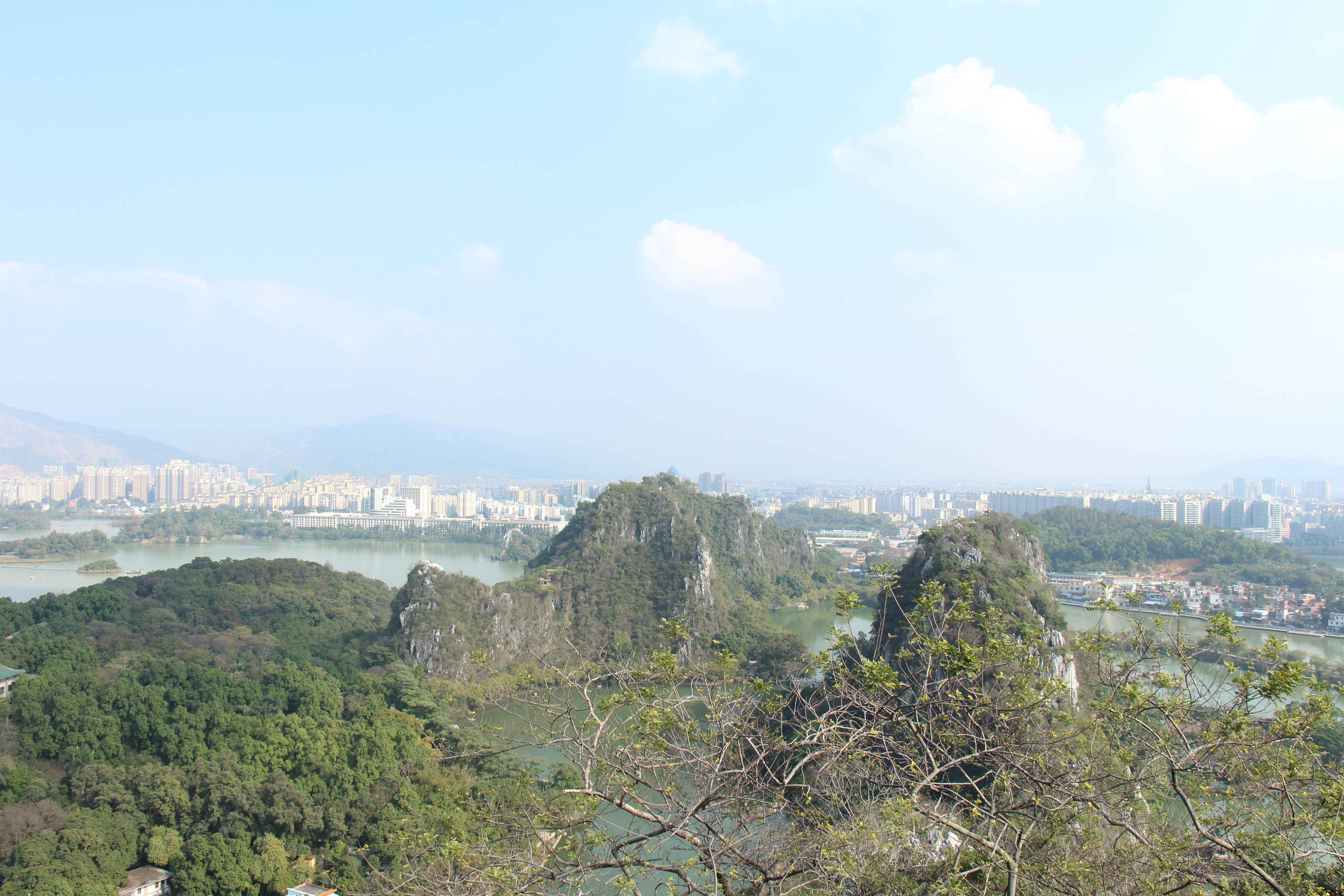
The Seven Star Crags and the Star Lake

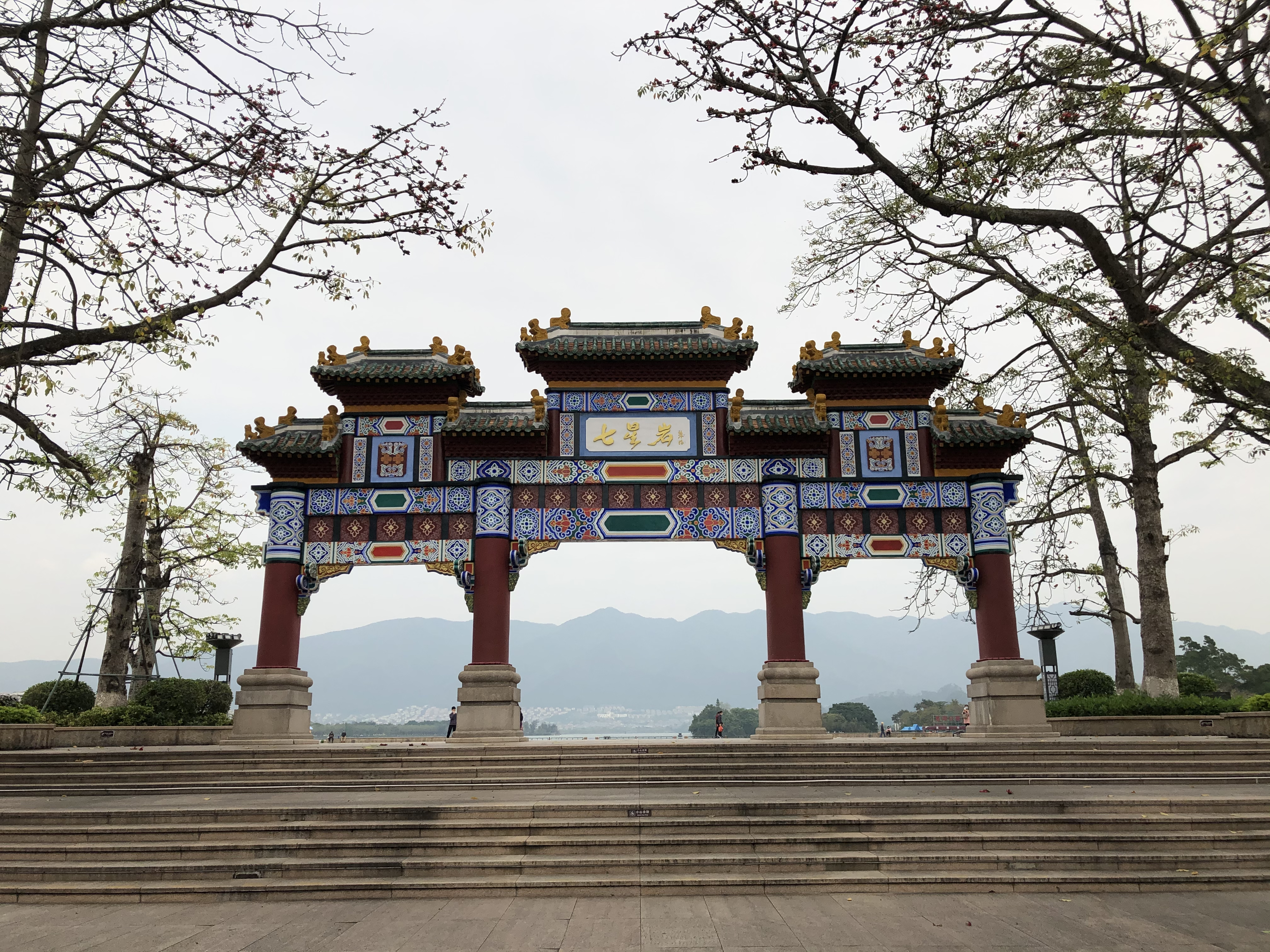
Memorial Archway Square, with the Star Lake in the background.

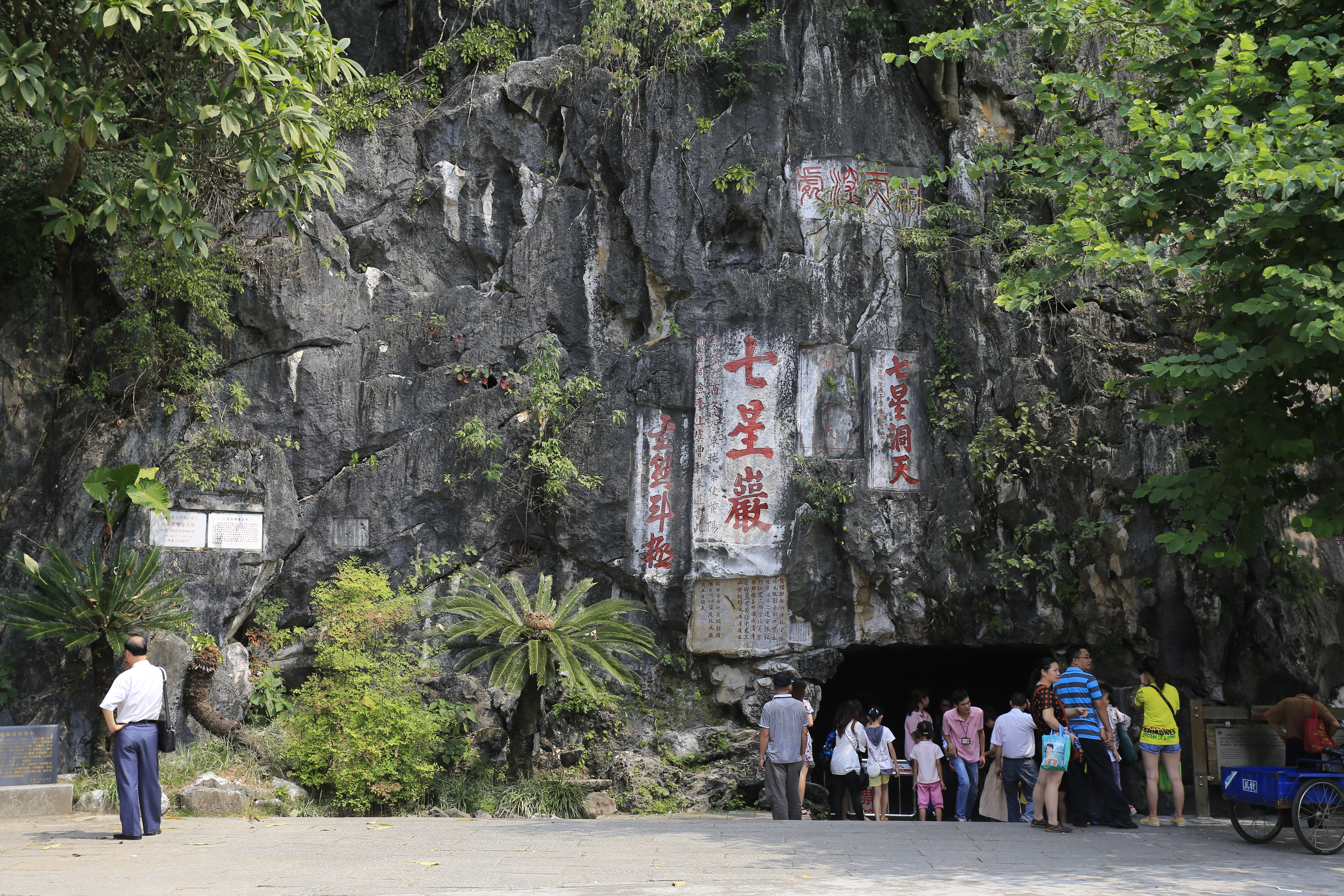
Seven Star Crags

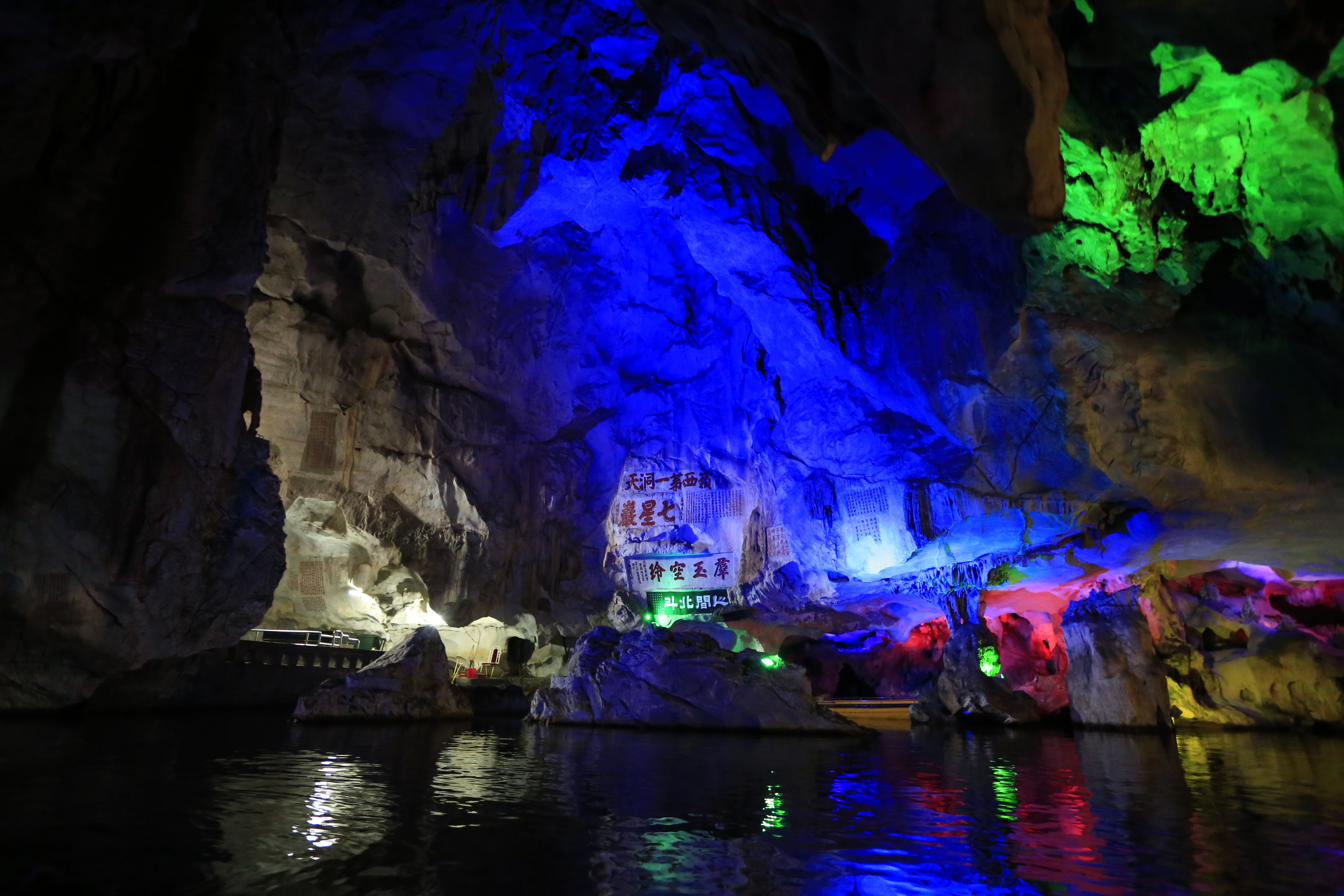
Cave river within the Seven Star Crags

The Seven Star Crags (Chinese: 七星岩; pinyin: Qīxīng Yán; Jyutping: Cat^{1}sing^{1} Ngaam^{4}) are located across from the center of Zhaoqing City, Guangdong, People's Republic of China. The crags are all situated in or around Star Lake directly opposite Paifang square in downtown Zhaoqing.

The area including the crags and Star Lake compromise 8 km^{2} (3 sq mi). The lake is partitioned into five separate sections divided with small strips of land and walkways. They form one of the most scenic locations in the province and are one of the main tourist draws of the city, the other being Dinghu Mountain. The crags are many times referred to as the little Guilin due to their striking visual similarity to Guilin's mountains.

== Description ==
The limestone crags are naturally arranged in the same formation as the seven stars of the Big Dipper constellation. Legend has it that the pillars of limestone grew from stars that fell from the skies. There are a number of caves in this 8 km^{2} (3 sq mi) area and some contain underground rivers that are large enough to navigate by boat. One of the crags can be climbed, having steep stairs going up the side; at the top is a small pavilion for viewing the lake and neighboring crags. Boat tours of the crags and lake can be taken from the area west of Paifang Square. Star Lake has been designated a national park.

Numerous sculptures of Buddhist and Taoist idols are located around Star Lake. There is also a reserve for migratory birds within reach by boat ride.

Beautiful views of the crags and lake can be seen by driving or walking on Xinghu West Road on the west of the lake and Xinghu Avenue on the east.

Seven Star Crags consist of crags, lake and caves. The seven crags, seen like the Big Dipper at a distance, stand one after another around a vast expanse of dark green lake water. It boasts a scenery of the West Lake in Hangzhou and the hills in Guilin. There are 531 pieces of cliff inscription in this place. It is a major historical and cultural site under state protection.
