= Yodobashi Camera =

Japanese retail chain

Yodobashi Camera Co., Ltd.

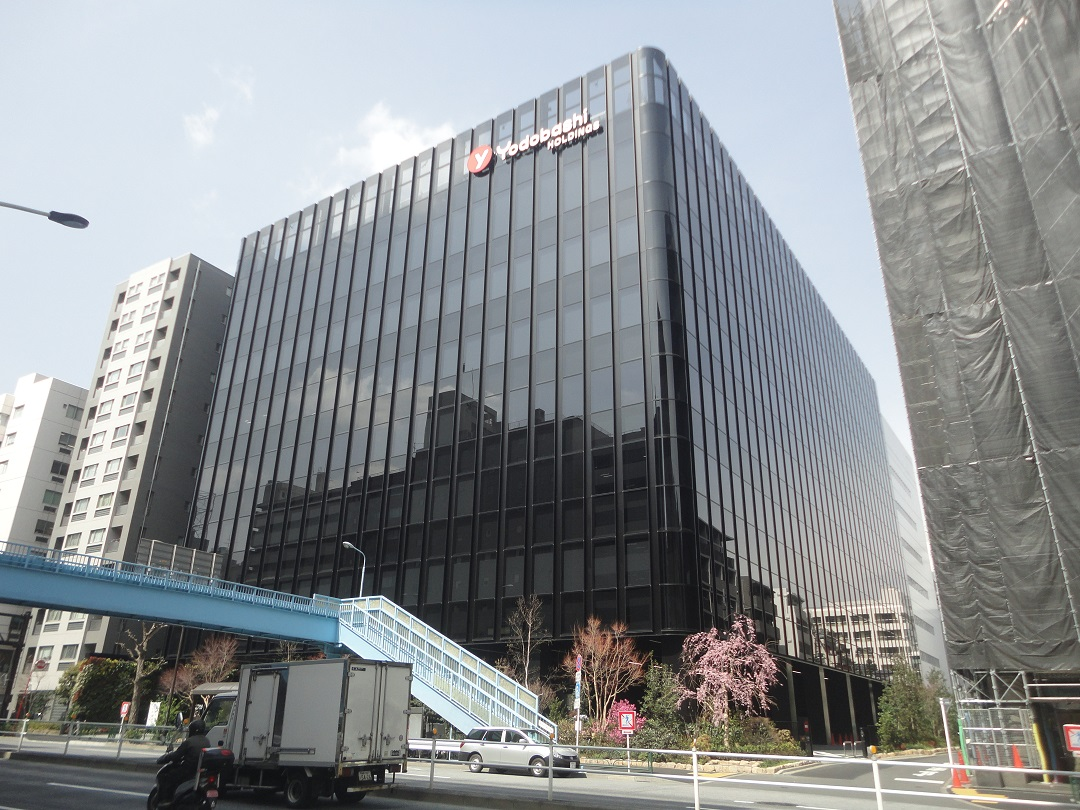
- Yodobashi Holdings headquarters in Shinjuku
- Native name: 株式会社ヨドバシカメラ
- Romanized name: Kabushiki gaisha Yodobashi Kamera
- Type: Kabushiki gaisha
- Industry: Retail
- Founded: April 1960; 66 years ago
- Founder: Terukazu Fujisawa
- Headquarters: Shinjuku, Tokyo, Japan
- Number of locations: 25
- Area served: Japan
- Products: Consumer electronics; Home appliances; Video games and consoles; Toys
- Number of employees: 5000 (April 2016)
- Subsidiaries: Goldpoint Marketing Co., Ltd. (100%)
- Website: www.yodobashi.com

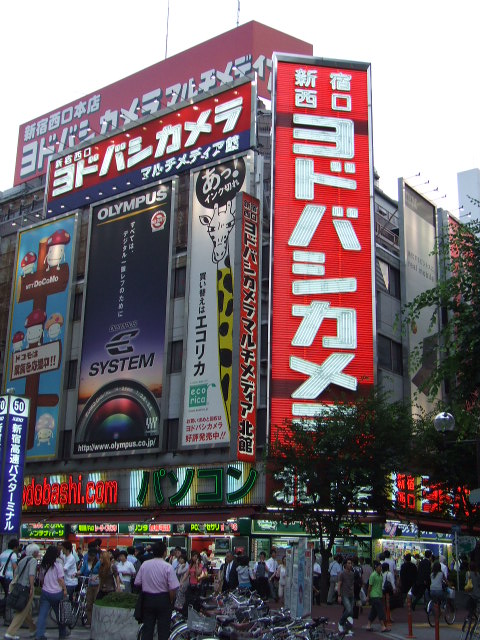
Shinjuku Nishiguchi Store, in Tokyo

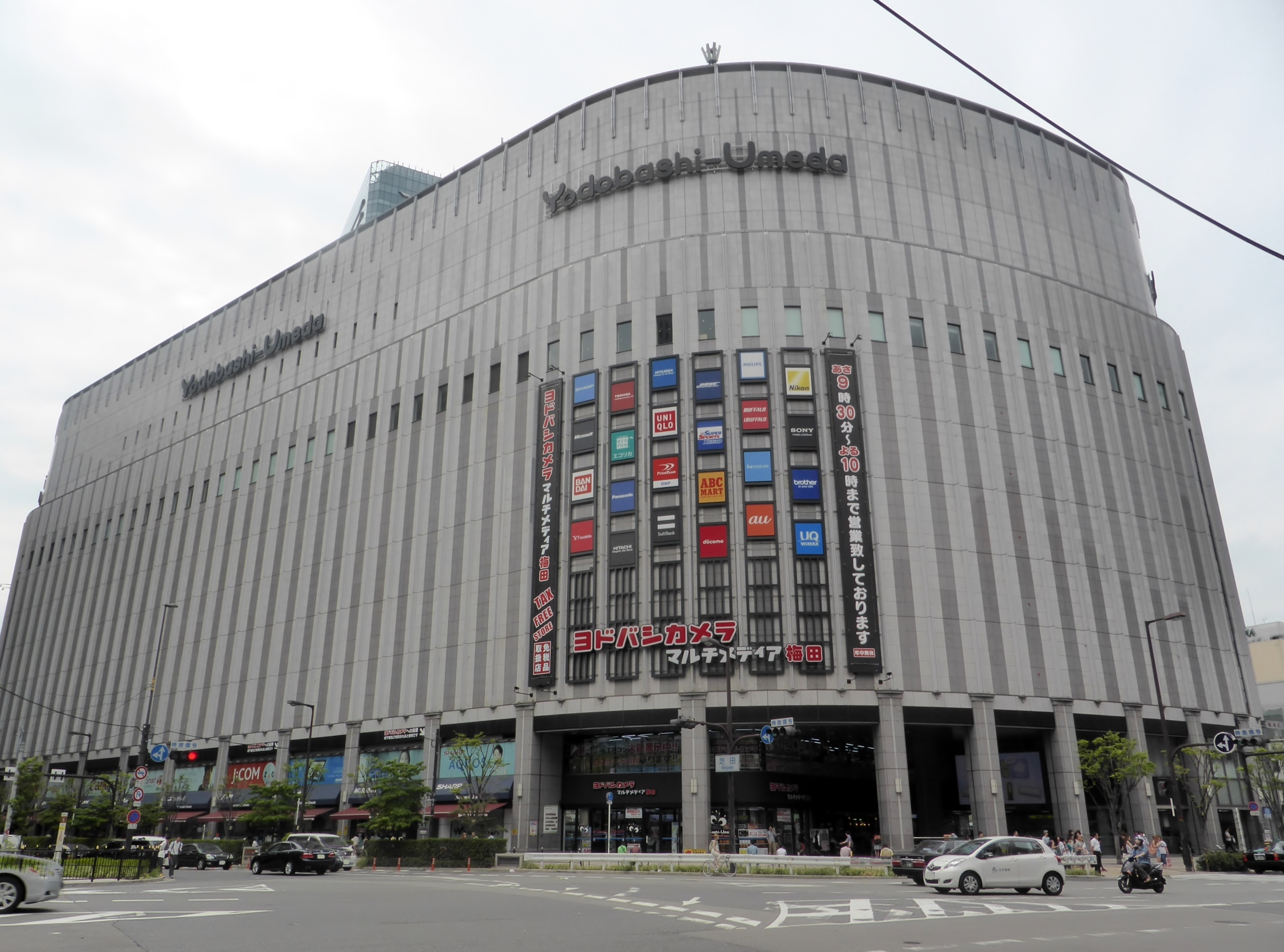
Yodobashi Umeda, in Osaka

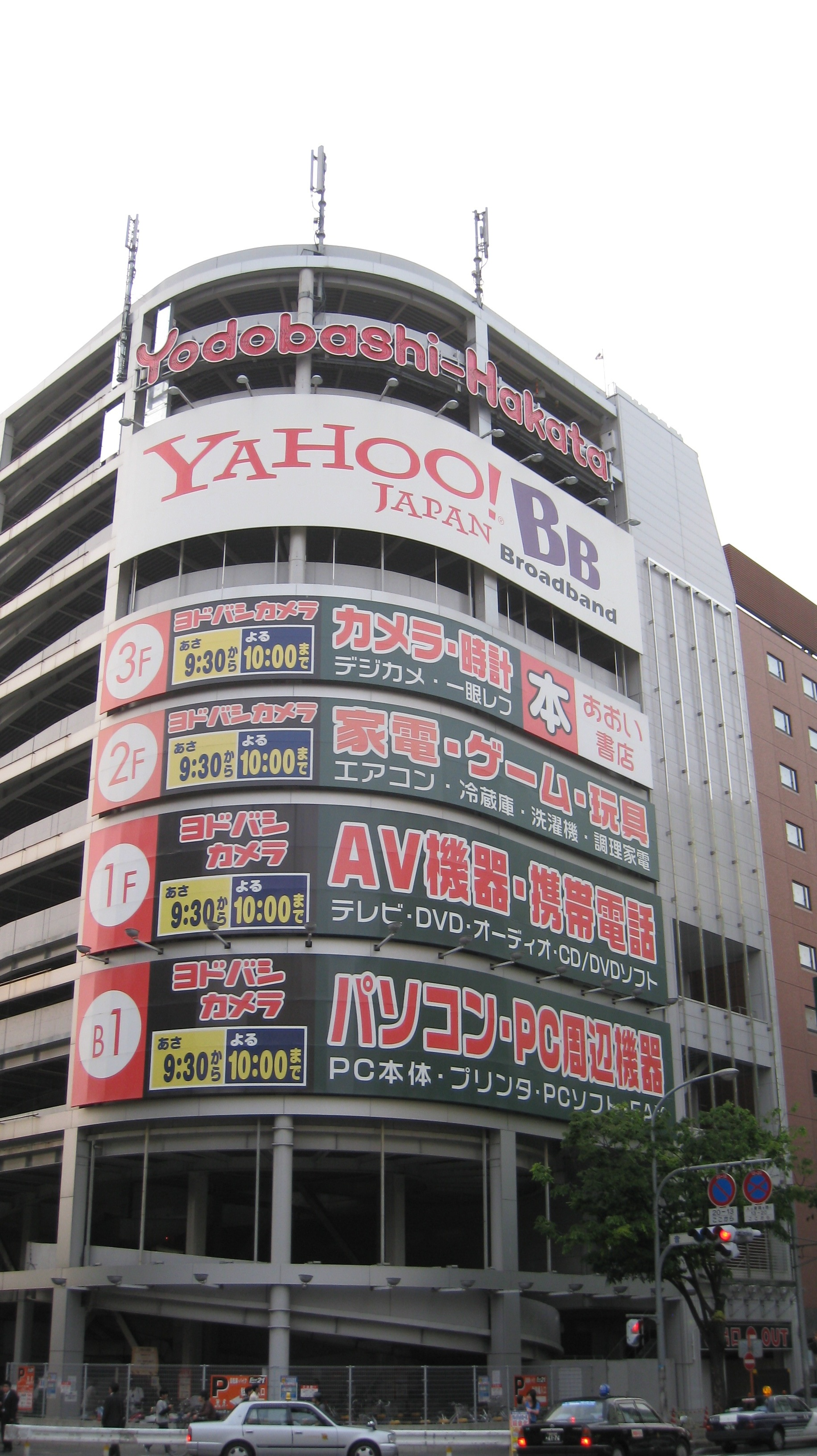
Yodobashi Hakata, in Fukuoka

Yodobashi Camera Co., Ltd. (株式会社ヨドバシカメラ, Kabushiki gaisha Yodobashi Kamera) is a major Japanese retail chain specializing in electronics, PCs, cameras and photographic equipment.

Yodobashi Camera's sales rank fourth among consumer electronics mass retailers in Japan, after Yamada Denki, Bic Camera, and K's Holdings. There are 25 stores operating as of August 2026. In recent years, the online shopping platform has been developed to become the second largest in Japan only behind Amazon (though sales of Amazon are over 10 times higher).

== Overview ==
Yodobashi Camera was founded by Terukazu Fujisawa (藤沢 昭和, Fujisawa Terukazu) in 1960. The original product line up focused on cameras and photographic equipment. Fujisawa adopted a technique of opening up the entrances of his first stores in Shinjuku, Ueno and Yokohama to allow a large number of the available products to be seen at a glance, facilitating high volume sales at low prices. The stores were in relatively small buildings at prime locations in front of train stations with heavy foot traffic. Catchy, simple versions of the songs in Yodobashi Camera TV commercials were played in the stores. The store name always included "Shinjuku Station West Entrance" when mentioned to promote as sense of familiarity in potential customers unfamiliar with the location. Cameras at the time tended to be high-end with prices as high as several hundred thousand yen for a single camera, but customers were incentivized to spend the train fare and time going to inspect these cameras costing tens of thousands of yen below market prices. There was also the advantage of being able to compare products, which attracted consumers.

The Yodobashi Camera product range expanded significantly over time to include home electronics, PCs, audio visual (AV) equipment, toys, branded goods and reading material. The Multimedia Pavilion concept was created, starting with the purpose-built Multimedia Sendai on the site of the former JNR Settlement Corporation freight yard in front of the Sendai train station, where the existing stores were combined and relocated at the east entrance (March 1997), significantly increasing shop floor area.

Yodobashi Camera headquarters moved from Kitashinjuku, Shinjuku, Tokyo to the current location in March 2019.

== History ==
- 1960– Started off as Fujisawa Shashin Shokai
- 1974 – Changed its name to Yodobashi Camera Co., Ltd.
- 1975 – Shinjuku Nishiguchi Store opens (first store created)
- 1989 – Publishes Yodobashi Point Card
- 1998 – Internet shopping store opens
- 2005 – Akiba megastore location opens
- 2019 – Moved headquarters to Shinjuku, Shinjuku-ku, completes acquisition of Ishii Sports Co. Ltd in April of the same year

== Stores ==
There are 16 stores in the Kanto region (9 in Tokyo, 4 in both Yokohama and Kawasaki in Kanagawa Prefecture, 1 in Saitama, 1 in Chiba, and 1 in Utsunomiya in Tochigi Prefecture).Outside of the Kanto region, Sapporo in Hokkaido, Sendai in Miyagi Prefecture and Koriyama in Fukushima Prefecture in the Tohoku region, Niigata in Niigata Prefecture and Nagoya in Aichi Prefecture in the Chubu area (only in the Tokai area), the city of Kyoto in Kyoto Prefecture, the city of Osaka in Osaka Prefecture in the Kinki area, and the city of Fukuoka in Fukuoka Prefecture in Kyushu all have each one store. Expansion to all three of the large metropolitan areas and to all of the central regional metropolitan areas with the exception of Hiroshima was achieved with the opening of the store in Nagoya in 2015).

Each store is close to a train station, with the company embracing a "rail-side" strategy of being convenient and visible to potential customers traveling by train. Other companies in the industry such as Bic Camera and Yamada Denki under the LABI banner use the same strategy. In most cases, with notable exceptions such as Yodobashi Nagoya, Yodobashi Camera acquires land and constructs premises or purchases a site with a building for conversion. Yodobashi's inventory and distribution functions have been optimized using a large warehouse distribution network that began with YAC Kawasaki in Tonomachi (King Skyfront) in 2005. YAC is an acronym for "Yodobashi Assembly Center".

Yodobashi's first store in Shinjuku West has expanded into a complex of 12 pavilions: Multimedia North Building, South Building, East Building, Travel Building, Camera Building, an adult (erotic) software sales area, Print Building, Repair & Film Building, Mobile Phone Accessories Building, Game & Hobby Building, Gashapon (vending machine toys in capsules) and Multi-purpose Clock & Watch Building, occupying a significant area around Shinjuku Station West. The location of the first ever store is the current Multimedia East Building. Since the 1980s, surrounding buildings have been purchased for store expansion with repeated renovations to combine multiple buildings into a single entity. Differences in the heights of the floor surfaces remain as a reminder of the numerous buildings that have been combined to create the superstore. This is particularly noticeable in the Multimedia North Building with the largest area that was converted from a former office building and adjacent multi-story car park purchased in 1998. Initially, the first floor was partially open and the sales area went as far as the third floor, but the selling space was expanded to cover the entire building, now consisting of a basement floor and 8 floors above ground connected by an escalator. In addition, Yodobashi Camera opened Multimedia Shinjuku East at the east entrance to the Shinjuku Station as well.

All large stores opened since the launch of Multimedia Sendai in 1997 bear the "Multimedia" name. The majority of the existing stores were also remodeled to fit the Multimedia format, and as of March 2016 the only stores not bearing the "Multimedia" name were the Shinjuku West Flagship, Hachiōji and Chiba outlets.

In 1997 the company successfully bid 101 billion yen to purchase the JNR Osaka Railroad Administration site north of the Osaka Station from the Japanese National Railway Settlement Corporation (JNRSC). 150 billion yen was invested in the construction of Yodobashi Umeda that opened in November 2001. Yodobashi Umeda resembles a large shopping center with the core Yodobashi Camera Multimedia Umeda supplemented by specialty stores and restaurants. Multimedia Umeda has annual sales of more than 100 billion yen, the highest sales of any retail outlet in Japan.

Subsequently, Yodobashi Camera opened a series of superstores close to train stations taking advantage of department store and rail network hubs. These include: building the multimedia store at the Hakata Station Shinkansen entrance; acquiring a freight depot site on the east side of Akihabara Station from the JNRSC for Multimedia Akiba (Yodobashi Akiba); a half-year full renovation of the Yokohama Mitsukoshi site to open Multimedia Yokohama (Yodobashi Yokohama), thus consolidating the Nishiguchi Gobangai (5th Avenue at the west entrance) operations; acquiring the north side Kichijōji Station site (previously the Tokyo branch of the Kintetsu Department Store) and remodelling the buildings to open Multimedia Kichijoji (Yodobashi Kichijoji).

5 November 2010 saw the opening of Multimedia Kyoto, purpose built on the site of the Kyoto branch of the Kintetsu Department Store (Platz Kintetsu Kyoto) in front of JR Kyōto Station's Karasuma Central Entrance. Yodobashi Akiba, Yodobashi Kichijoji, Yodobashi Yokohama, Kyoto Yodobashi and Yodobashi Hakata are large shopping centers that include multiple tenants in the same way as Yodobashi Umeda.

The Multimedia Nagoya Matsuzaka Store was opened on 29 October 2015, covering floors 4 to 6 of the south building of the Matsuzakaya store in Nagoya. There had been no store in the Tokai region up to that point. The Matsuzakaya store in Nagoya was expected to revitalize the area as there was no large electronics retailer in the Sakae area. The 7,200 m2 sales floor makes this is a medium-sized Yodobashi outlet (stores near train stations typically have a 20,000 m2 or more sales floor). There was initially a plan to open a store in front of Nagoya Station, but it was announced on 14 May 2015 that this had been canceled due to financial problems arising from delays with the Gate Tower Building opening (ultimately Bic Camera opened in the JR Gate Tower premises).

On 30 June 2026, Yodobashi opened its Ikebukuro branch after acquiring half of the Seibu Ikebukuro building on 1 September 2024.

=== List of all Yodobashi stores ===
Tokyo

- Shinjuku Nishiguchi Honten (Shinjuku Station – West Exit)
- Multimedia Shinjuku Higashiguchi (Shinjuku Station – East Exit)
- Multimedia Akiba
- Multimedia Ueno
- Multimedia Kichijōji
- Multimedia Ikebukuro
- Hachiōji
- Multimedia Machida
- Multimedia Kinshichō

Saitama Prefecture

- Multimedia Saitama Shintoshin

Kanagawa Prefecture

- Multimedia Kawasaki Le Front
- Yodobashi Outlet Keikyū Kawasaki
- Multimedia Yokohama
- Multimedia Keikyu Kamiōoka

Chiba Prefecture

- Chiba

Hokkaido

- Multimedia Sapporo

Miyagi Prefecture

- Multimedia Sendai

Fukushima Prefecture

- Multimedia Kōriyama

Niigata Prefecture

- Multimedia Niigata

Tochigi Prefecture

- Multimedia Utsunomiya

Aichi Prefecture

- Multimedia Nagoya Matsuzakaya
- Nagoya Sunshine Sakae

Kyoto Prefecture

- Multimedia Kyoto

Osaka

- Multimedia Umeda

Fukuoka

- Multimedia Hakata
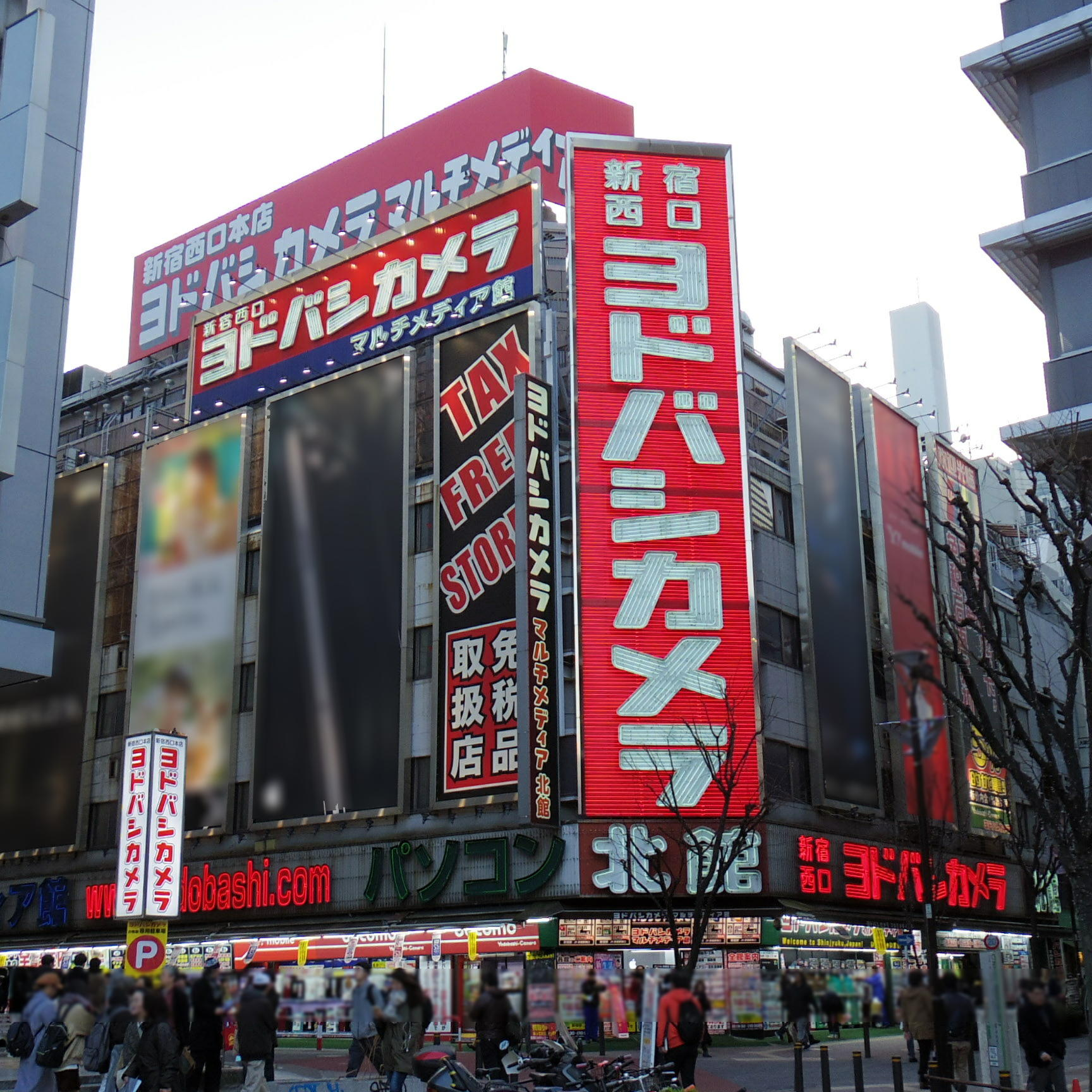
Yodobashi Shinjuku West

Yodobashi Multimedia Shinjuku East

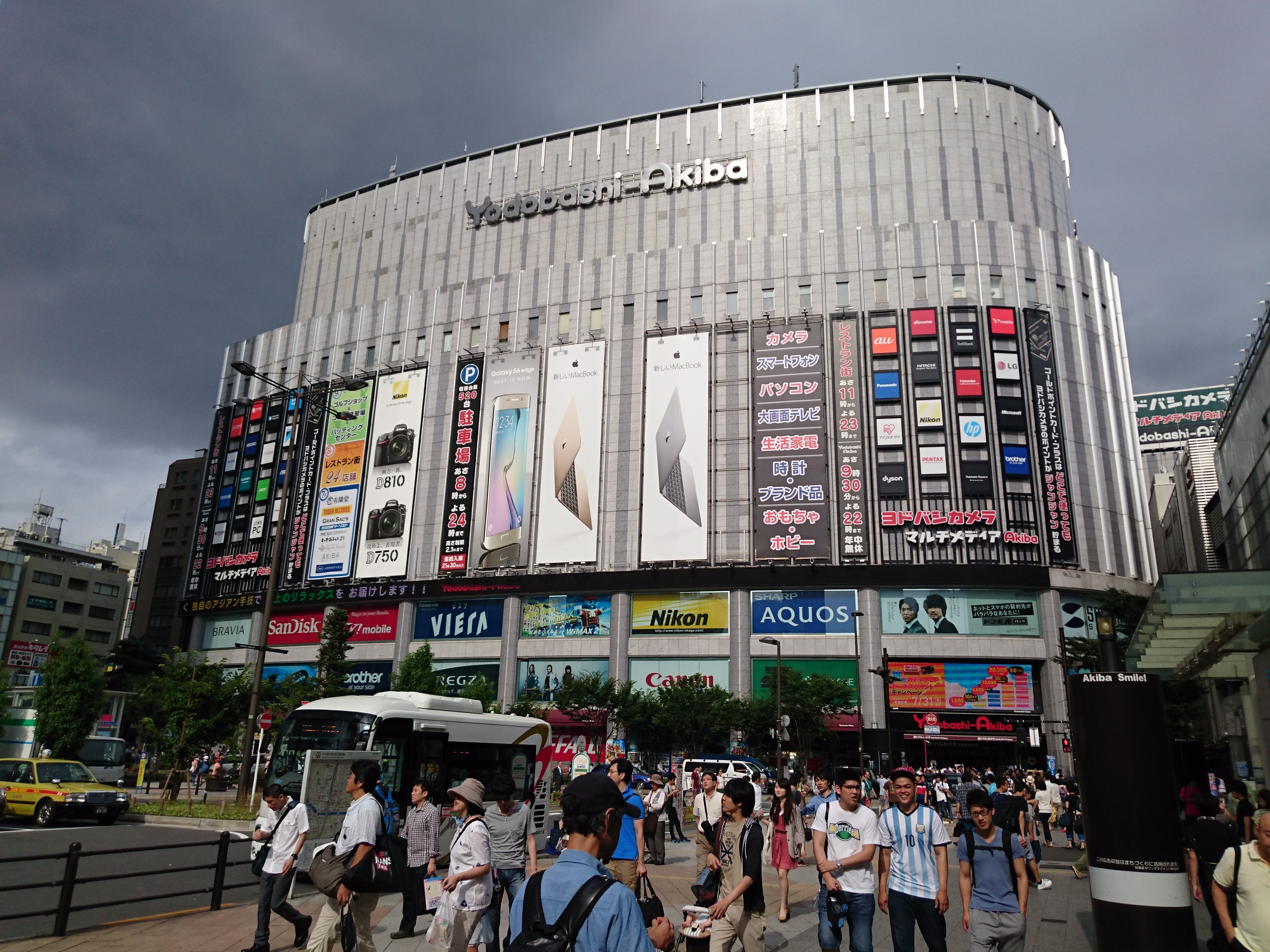
Yodobashi Multimedia Akiba

Yodobashi Multimedia Ueno

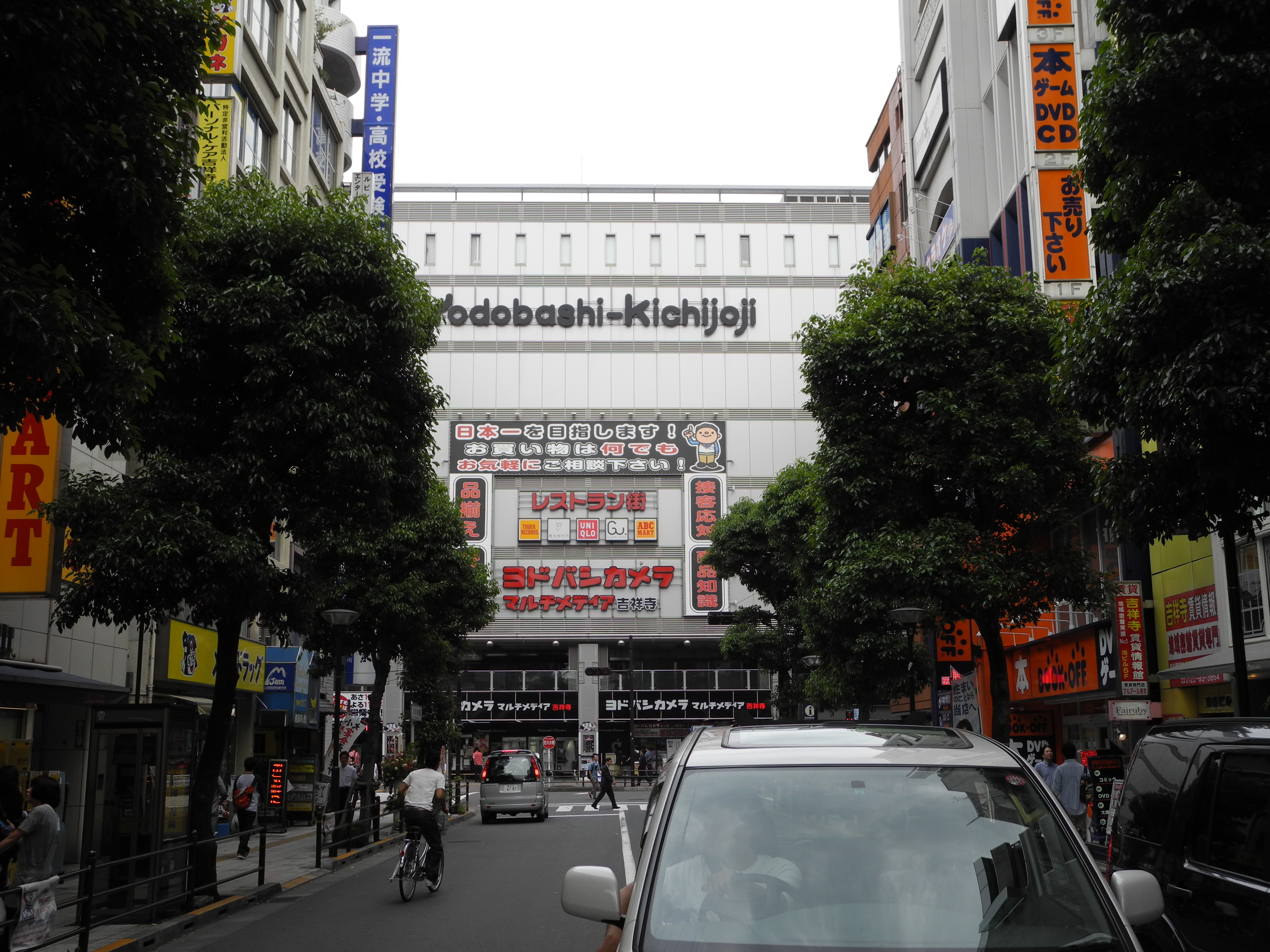
Yodobashi Multimedia Kichijoji

Yodobashi Multimedia Ikebukuro

Yodobashi Hachioji

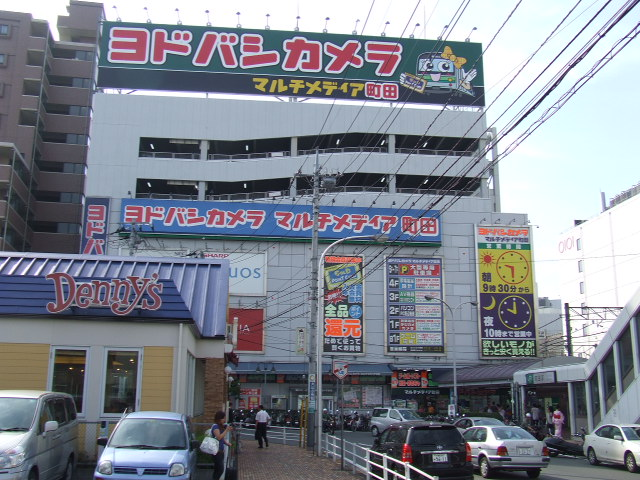
Yodobashi Multimedia Machida

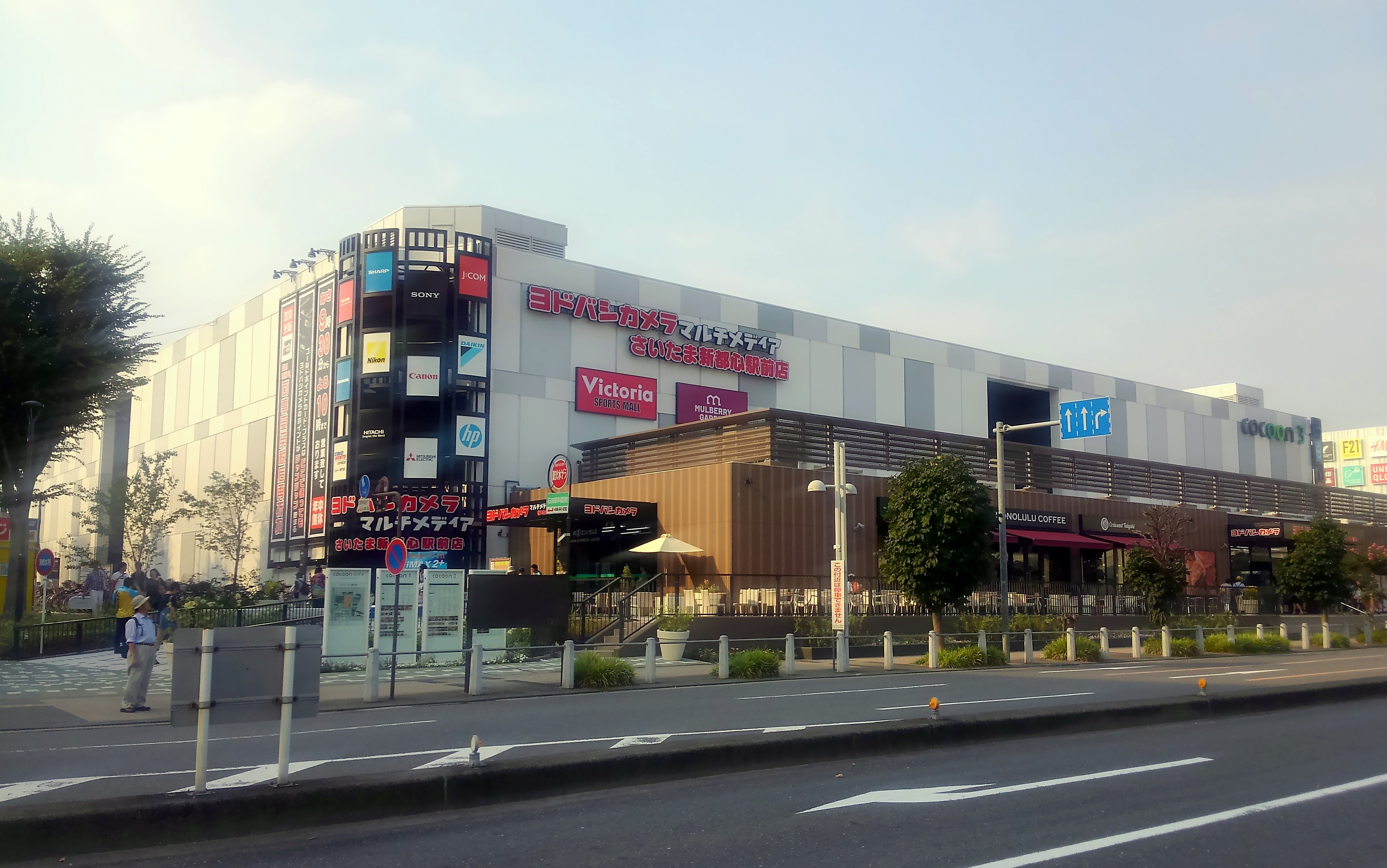
Yodobashi Multimedia Saitama

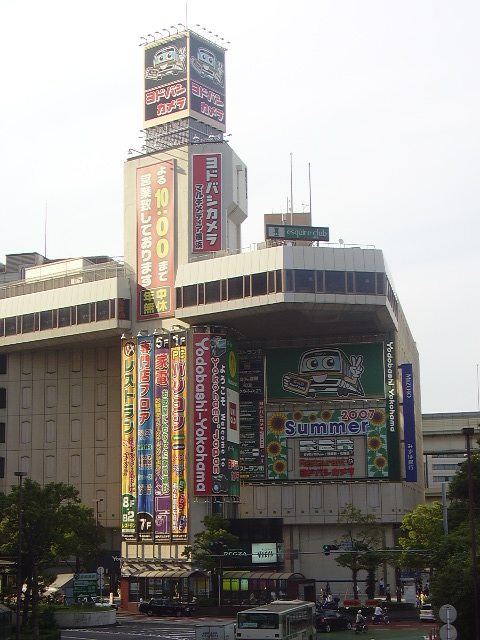
Yodobashi Multimedia Yokohama

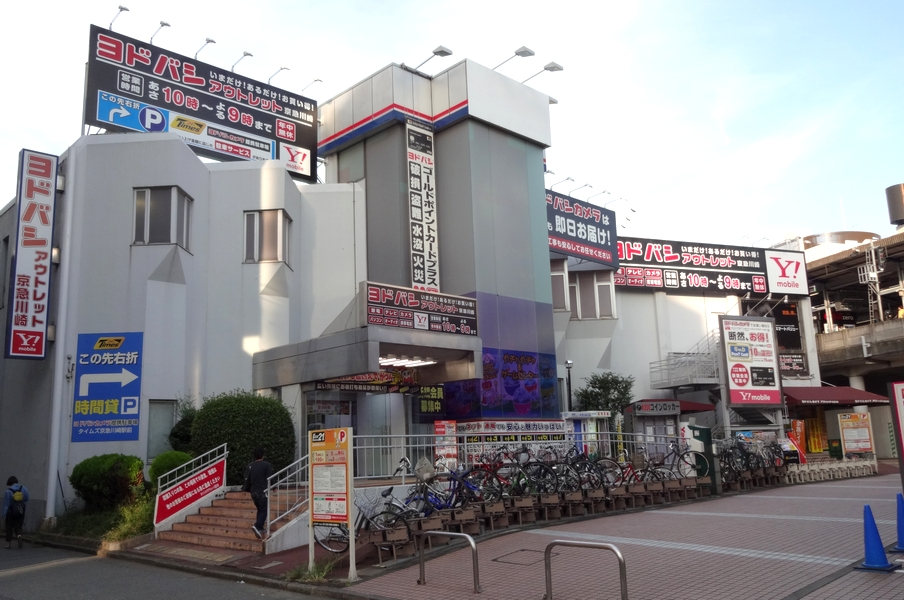
Yodobashi Kawasaki

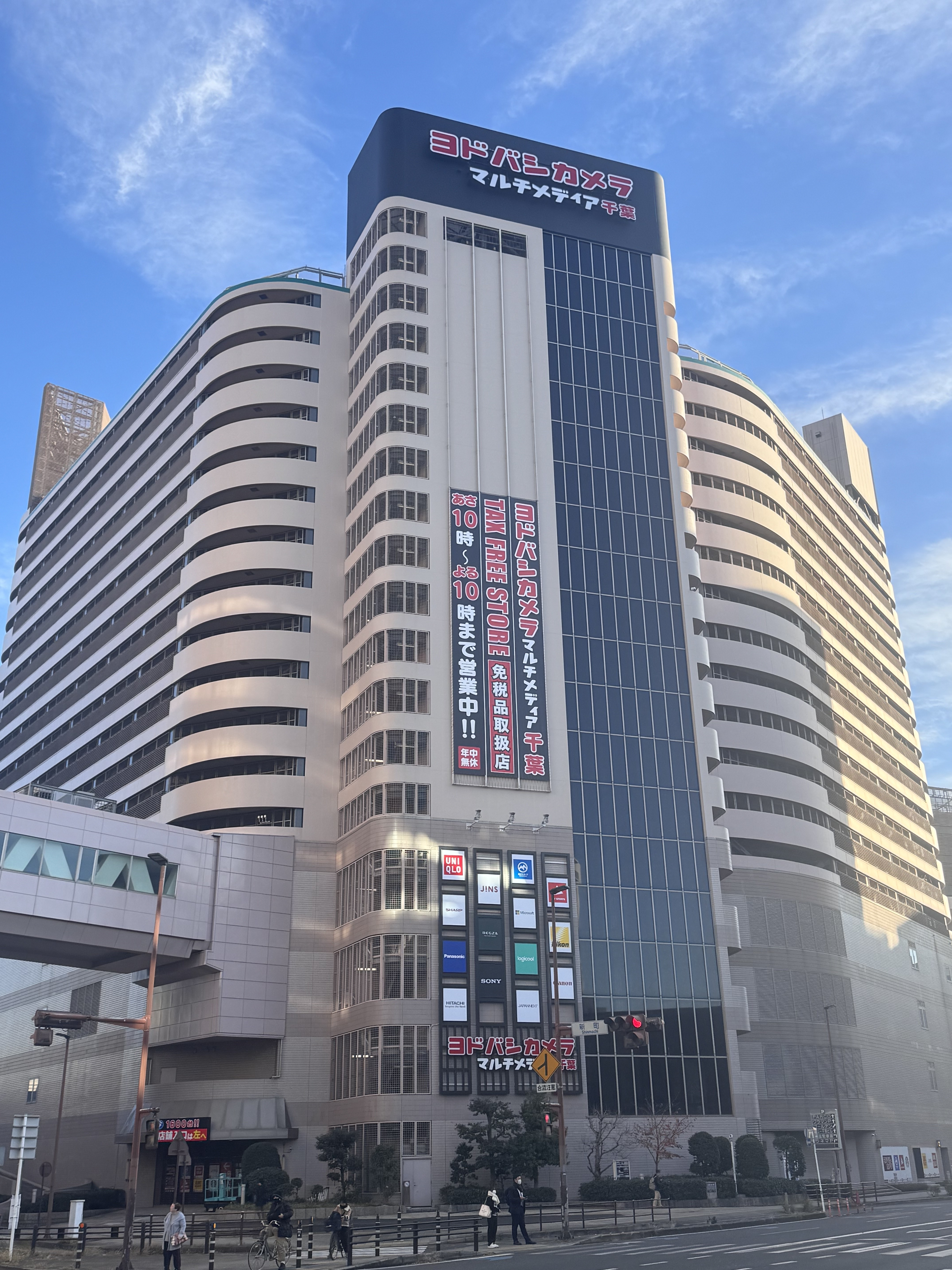
Yodobashi Multimedia Chiba

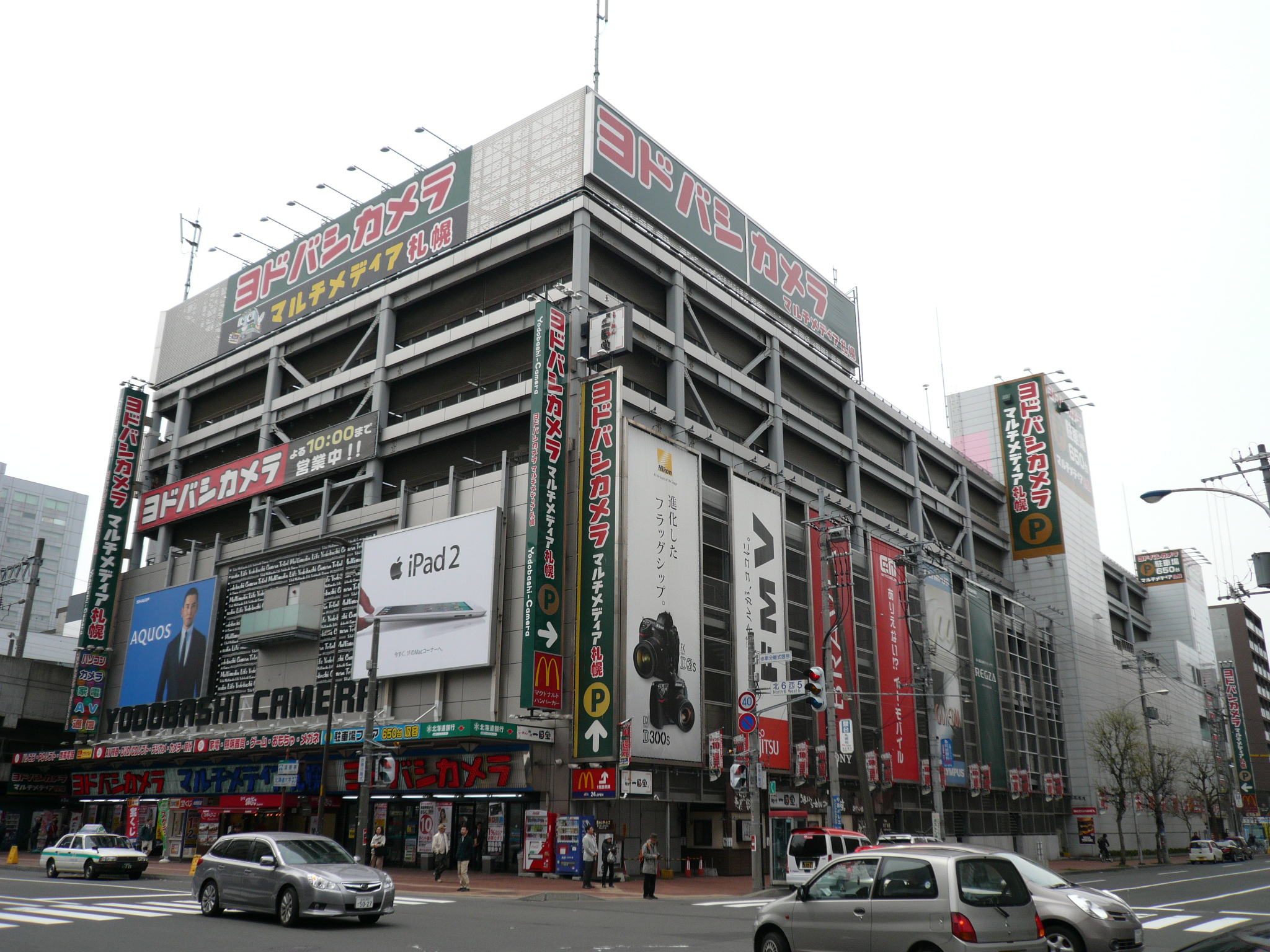
Yodobashi Multimedia Sapporo

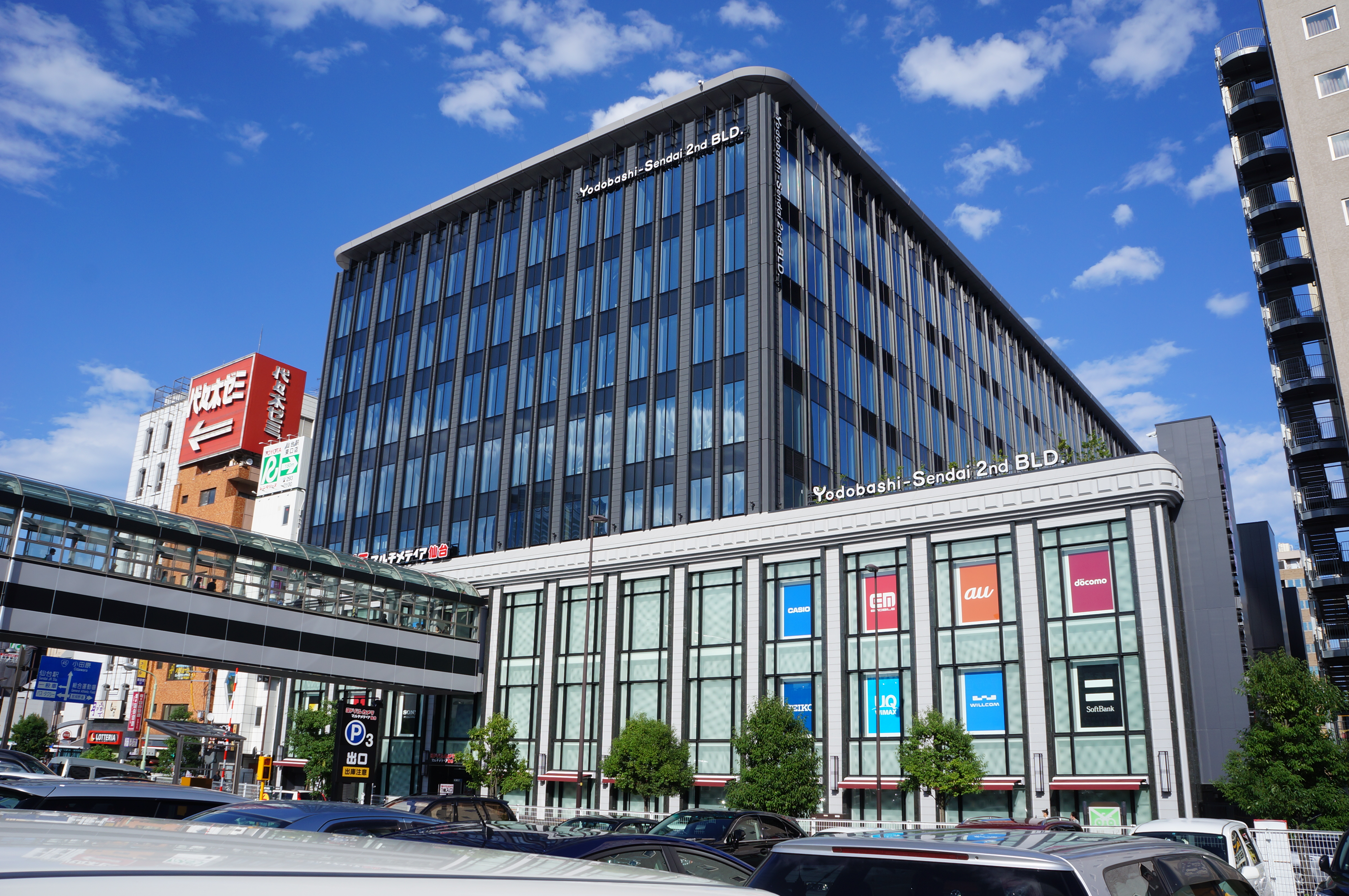
Yodobashi Multimedia Sendai

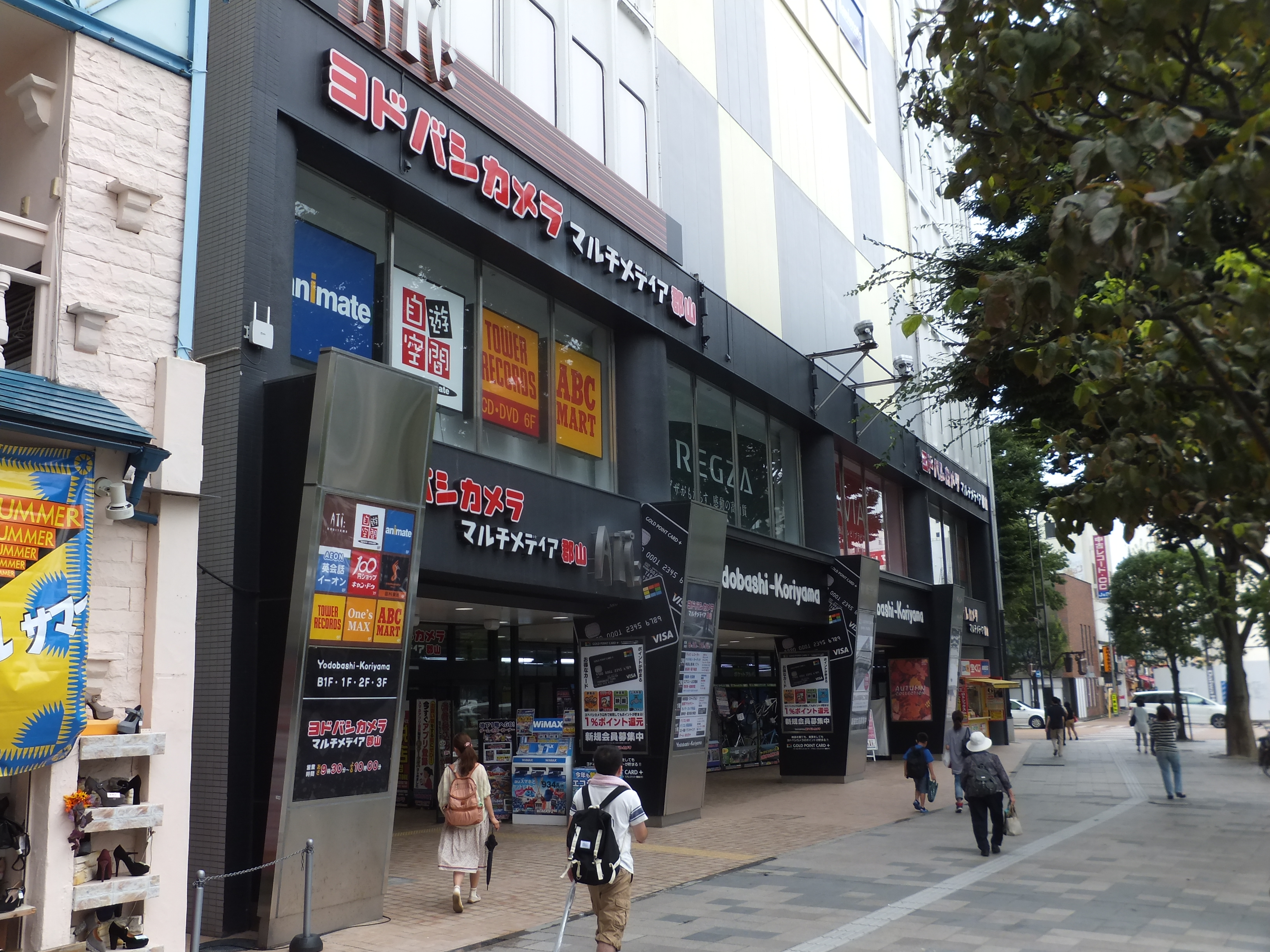
Yodobashi Multimedia Koriyama

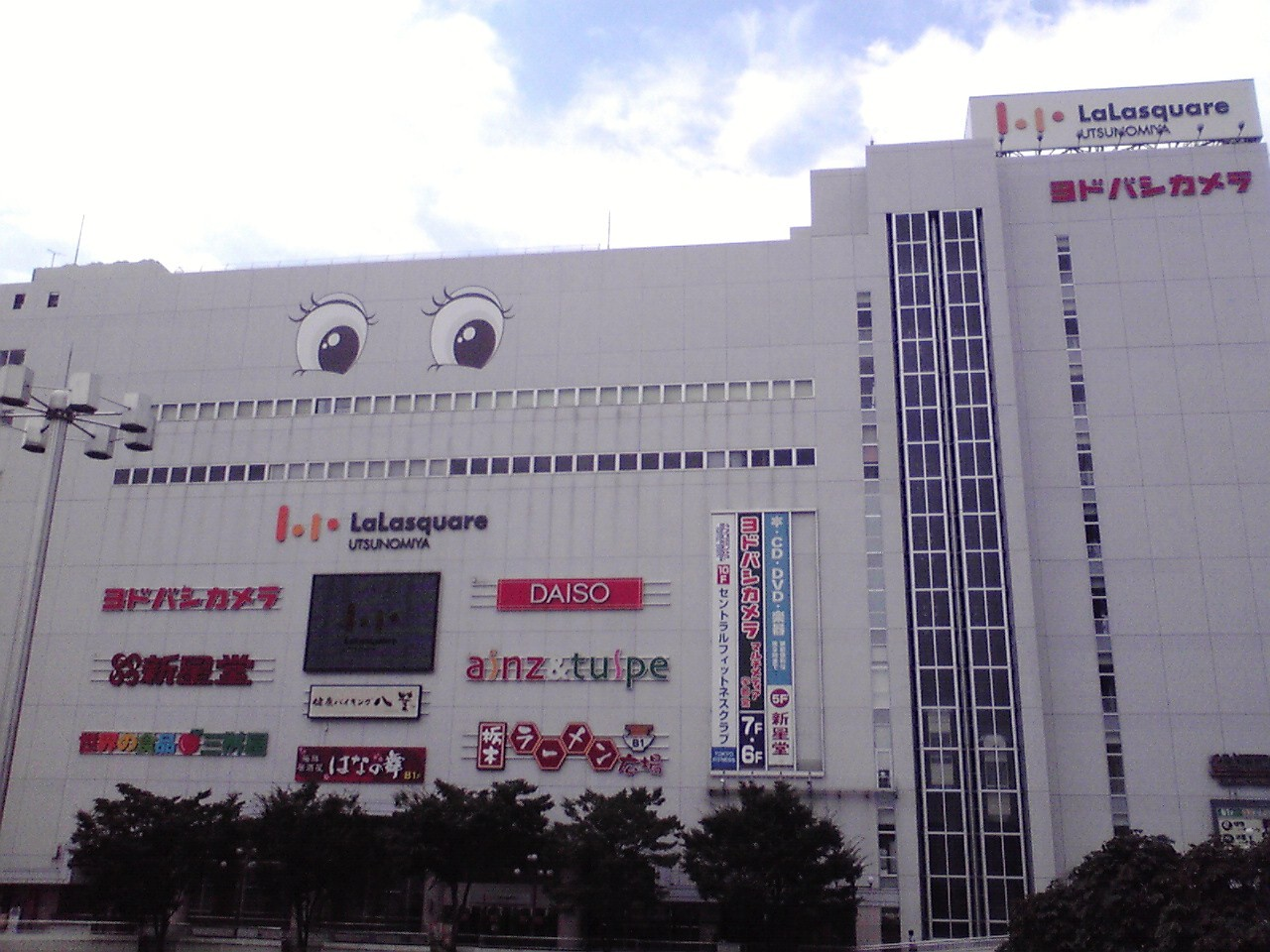
Yodobashi Multimedia Utsunomiya

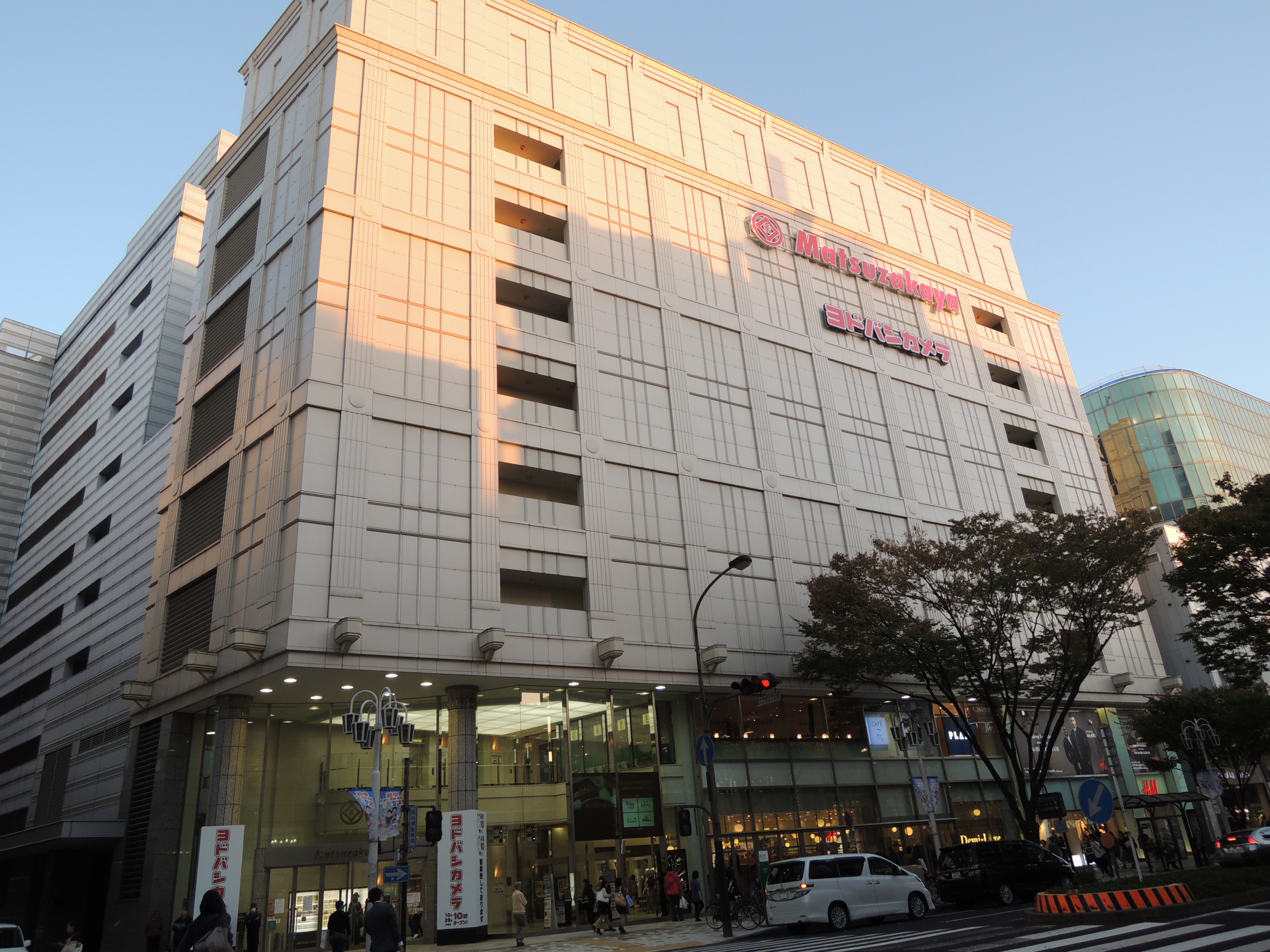
Yodobashi Multimedia Nagoya Matsuzakaya

Yodobashi Sunshine Sakae

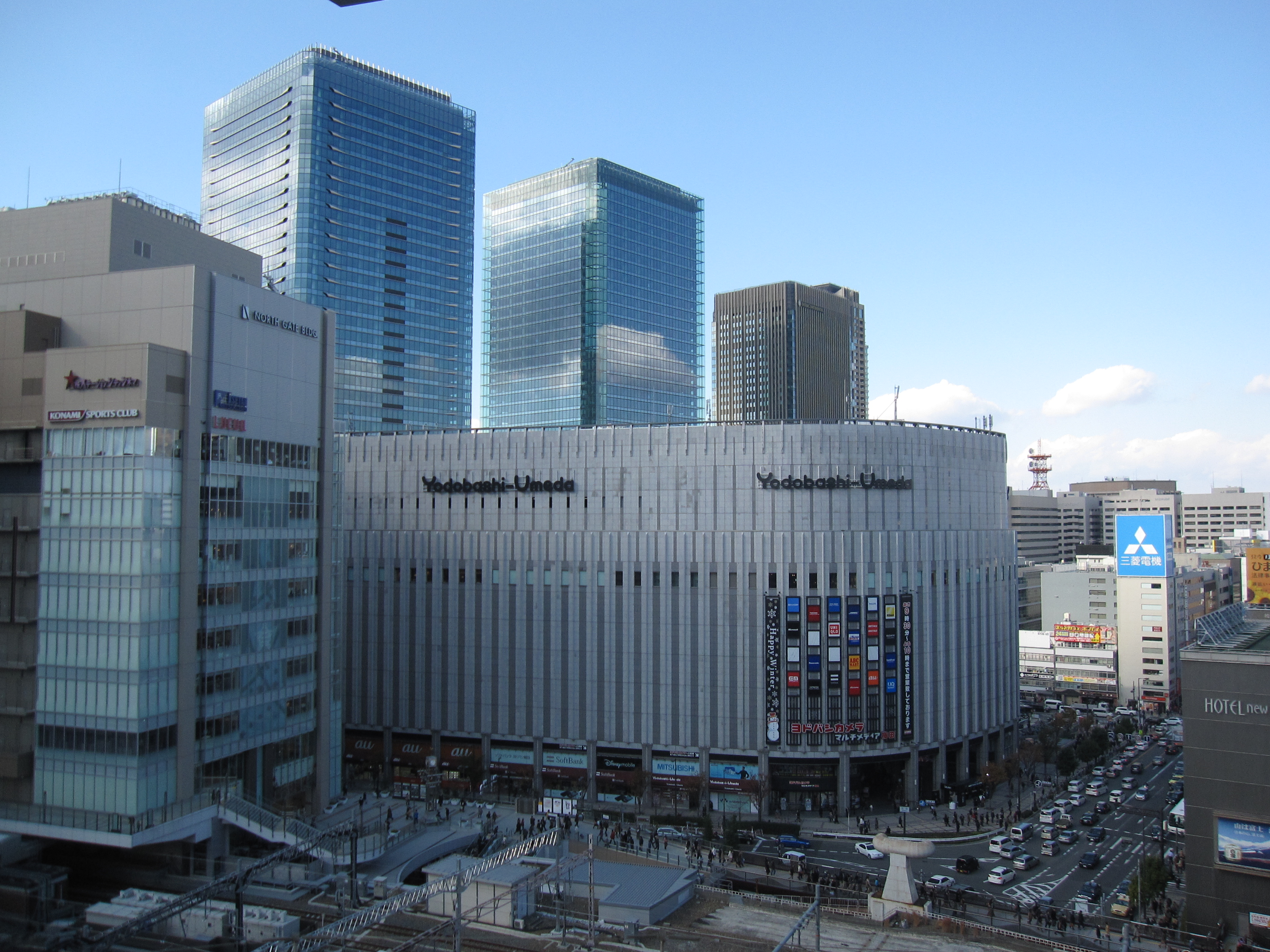
Yodobashi Multimedia Umeda

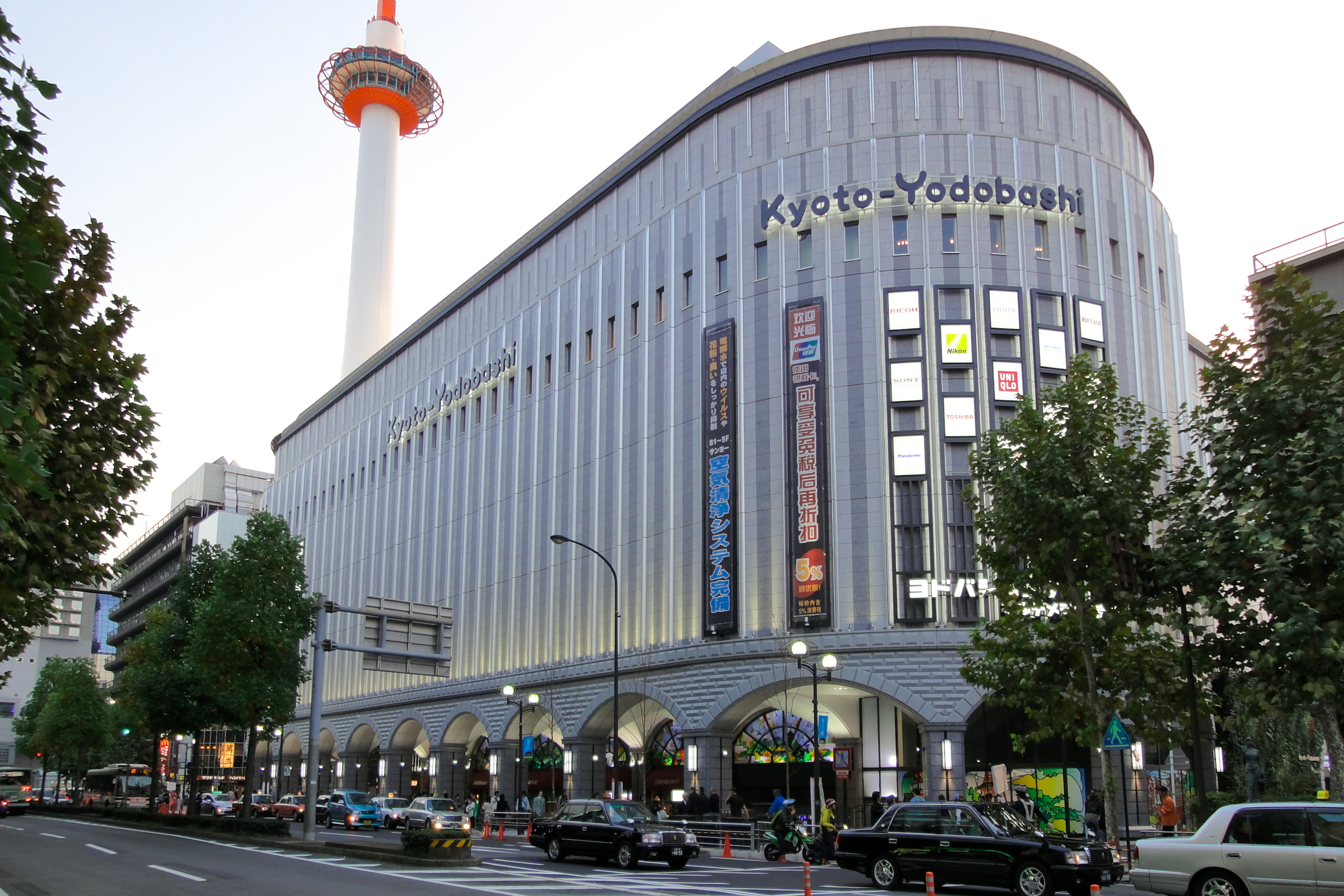
Yodobashi Multimedia Kyoto

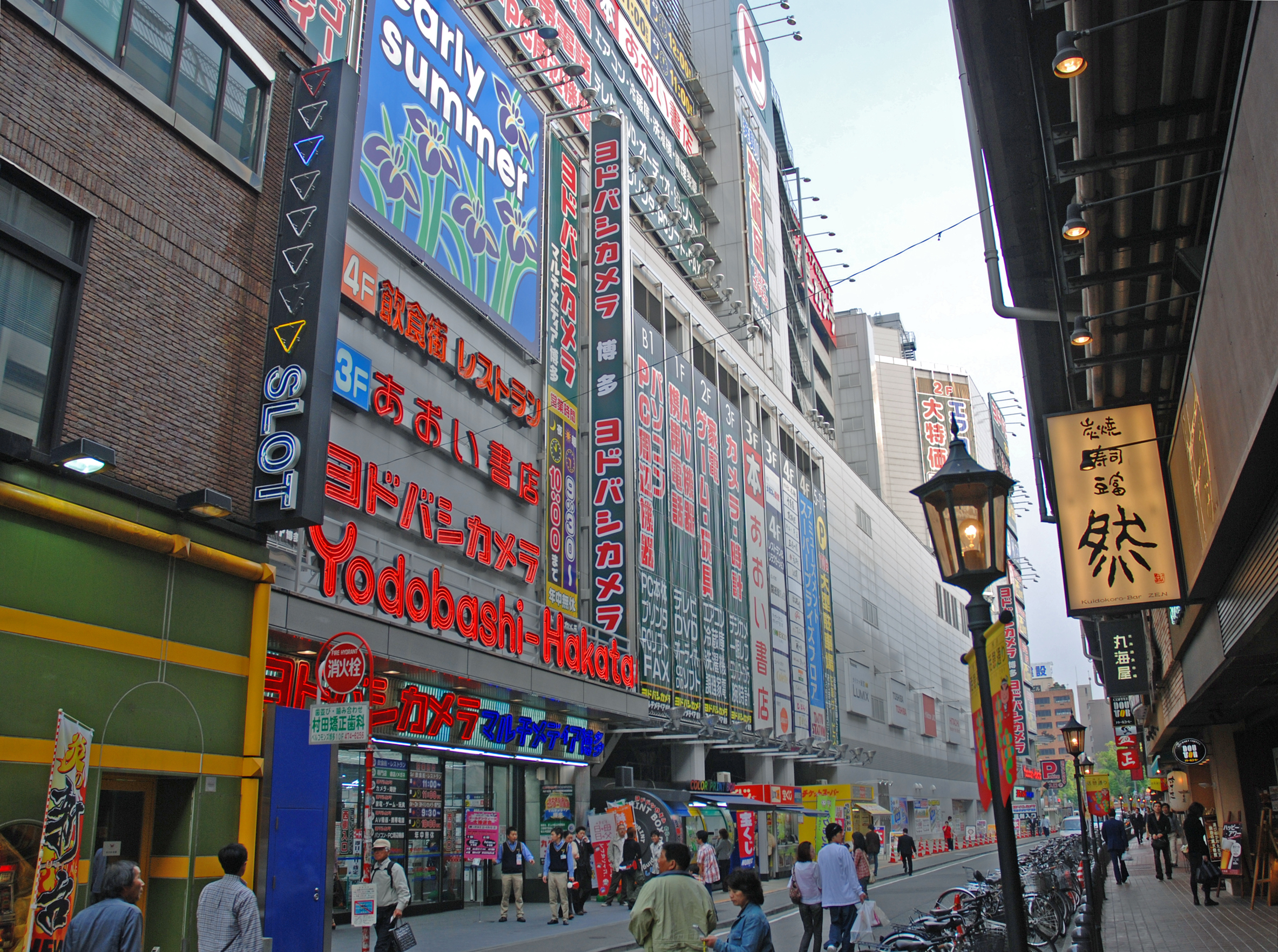
Yodobashi Multimedia Hakata

=== Planned store openings ===
==== Harajuku (Shibuya, Tokyo) ====
The former Kokudo Headquarters close to the Harajuku Station was acquired for a store to be opened in 2015. The plan was for a medium size store with a total floor area of approximately 10,000 m2, based on a concept of youth-focused communication with a full range of smart phones, tablets and related merchandise.

==== New Sendai store (Miyagino ward, Sendai) ====
The plan is for this store to be built on the site of the original Multimedia Sendai, opened as the anchor store for Yodobashi Sendai Building No. 1. The timing of the opening was initially set for 2014, later changed to October 2018 due to the redevelopment of Sendai Station East outlet. The area of the directly managed selling space is expected to be approximately 25,000 m2. Before construction, the original Multimedia Sendai was closed on 24 April 2012 and operations temporarily relocated (Yodobashi Sendai Building No. 2, Floors 1–3) from 26 April. The sales space in the temporary store was roughly 1.5 times the size of the old store.

==== New store in Shinjuku (Shinjuku ward, Tokyo) ====
The "MY [Meiji Yasuda] Shinjuku Building No. 2" (previously Yasuda Seimei Building No. 2), opposite the Shinjuku West Multimedia Store, was acquired in July 2010, with the plan to construct a newly built skyscraper following demolition and open for business in 2017. The Shinjuku West Flagship Store, currently operating out of multiple buildings, is expected to be transformed by 2020 and rebuilt as a skyscraper in conjunction with the MY Shinjuku Building No. 2 site, creating approximately 40,000 m2 of retail space.

==== New Sapporo store (Chuo ward, Sapporo) ====
The land and buildings (main building and loft building) of the Seibu store in Sapporo, that closed in September 2009, were acquired in January 2011 to be remodeled as a large shopping complex. The scheduled opening date is not yet known. The area of the directly managed selling space is expected to be more than 20,000 m2. Yodobashi Camera is conducting a study on the relocation of the current Multimedia Sapporo at Sapporo Station North to the new store. It is also studying integrated redevelopment with the city of Sapporo and the property owners of the surrounding buildings.

== Online shopping and e-Commerce ==
Yodobashi Camera operates the e-commerce website yodobashi.com for online shopping. Operations commenced in 1998 with a range of 8,000 products, expanding to reach 3 .7 million products in July 2015. High sales growth has also been achieved with 33.778 billion yen, 35.5 billion yen, 45.8 billion yen and 65.0 billion yen respectively for the fiscal years ending in March 2010, 2011, FY2012 and FY2013, and sales are expected to be 100 billion yen in FY2015

This growth was due to an increased number of products, free delivery for all products, even down to a single battery, and a proprietary distribution network. From the original "rail-side" retail outlet strategy with brick-and-mortar stores, the company had prepared for direct shipment from distribution centers to every home for large household appliances that are difficult for customers to transport home and take up significant shelf space in prime retail locations. Sales were increased by expanding the mail order department to create local distribution centers for direct home delivery of even large products.

The convenience of online shopping is used to counter purchasing behavior known as "show-rooming", where customers examine the products in-store and purchase from another retailer online. Yodabashi provides free Wi-Fi to facilitate price comparisons and although Yodobashi Camera may be at a disadvantage with respect to their prices being not as low as those on other e-commerce websites, this is compensated for by issues with the other websites such as additional delivery fees, the time and effort required to complete transactions, shipment and delivery times, and the fear of problems such as products not arriving and poor after sales service. Leveraging the credibility and scale of Yodobashi Camera with the delivery service means small e-commerce websites cannot compete and the nuisance of show-rooming is converted into actual sales for Yodobashi Camera. Yodobashi Camera is also aiming to make inroads into the user bases of other major e-commerce websites such as online supermarkets, online bookstores and online pharmacies with an expanded product range including daily necessities, food, books and pharmaceutical drugs.

== Commercials and jingles ==
=== Theme song ===
"Yodobashi Camera no Uta" (ヨドバシカメラの歌; lit. "Yodobashi Camera Song") uses the melody of "The Battle Hymn of the Republic" (to a similar tune to the Japanese-language nursery rhymes "Gonbee-san no Akachan" (権兵衛さんの赤ちゃん; lit. "Gonbee's Baby") and "Tomodachi Sanka" (ともだち讃歌; lit. "Friends' Hymn")). There are arrangements of this jingle for specific locations that are used in TV commercials and are broadcast within the stores. For a version featuring the Yamanote and Chuo train lines for use in the Shinjuku West Main Store, the lyrics were written by the company founder, Terukazu Fujisawa.

Initially, a male choral group sang over march-style background music. But a male-female version and a female version (frequently used), a male version, and an English version with a male/female duet were added later. In 1986 the theme song was changed to a rock song by the female vocalist Sumiko Fukuda. At the time of the stores founding the "Yama-No-Te Line" was called the "Yamate" and in the English version it was called "Yamate line". A version recorded by the anime song vocalist MIQ was first broadcast in 1990 with the "Yamate-sen" train line lyric retained, although this was a short-lived change.

== Services ==
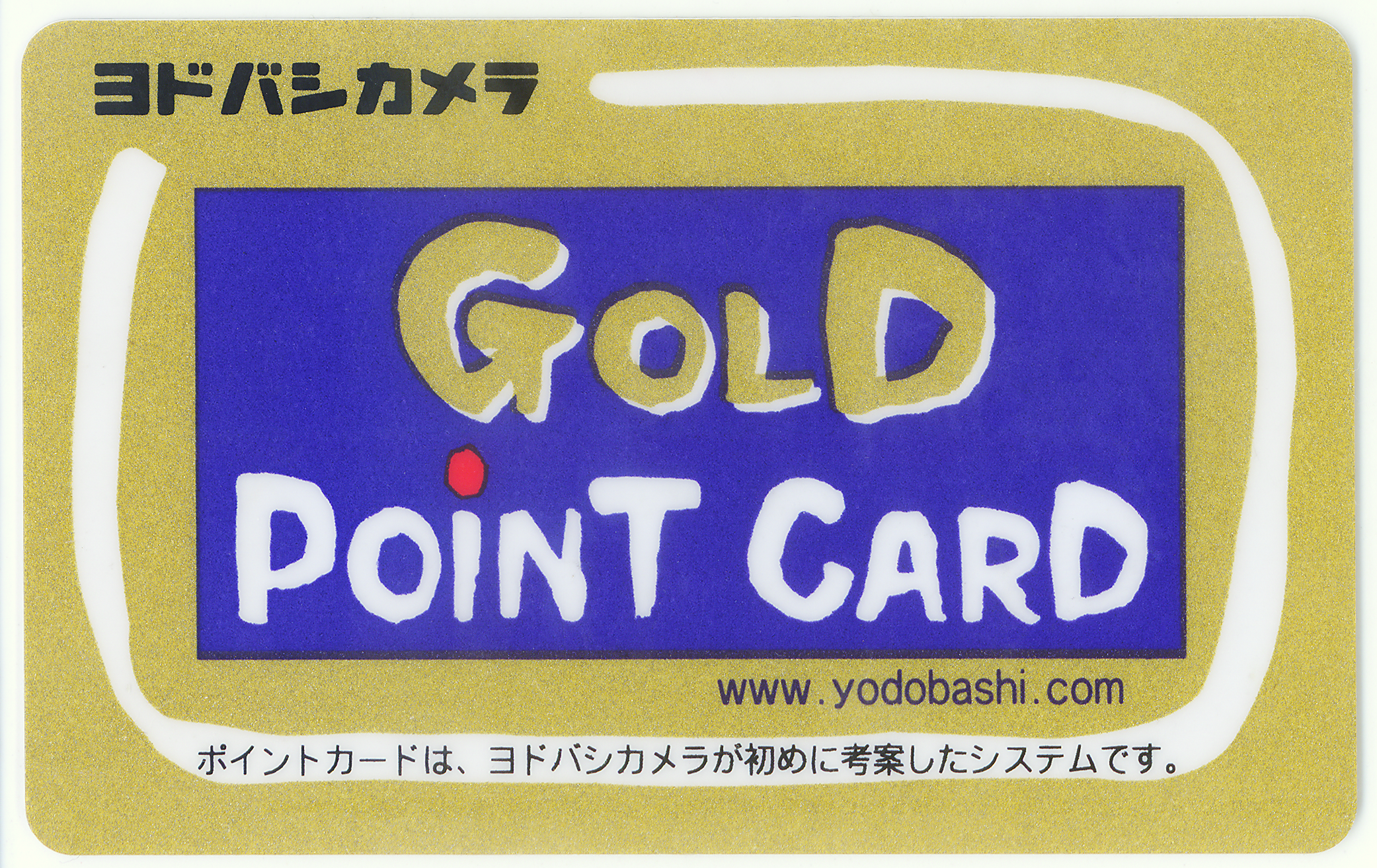
Gold point cards since 1990

In April 1989, the first point cards using barcodes in Japan were introduced. These were initially limited to the CD department and were made of paper (card stock) with a blue-green base color. The card was valid for one year (with the possibility of being transferred to someone else through a procedure at the sales point). In November 1990 a transition was made to a Gold Point Card made of plastic that could be used in any store section. It can be said that today's point cards where a point card is issued to an assigned cardholder and points are managed electronically were initially devised by Yodobashi Camera.

At that time when the consumption tax rate was 3%, tax-inclusive pricing was displayed. Yodobashi Camera initiated a policy of "not receiving consumption tax" in 1992, but in April 1997, the tax rate increased to 5% impacting profits, so commencing 1 April 1998, one year later, the tax was displayed separately (following the amendment to the law on 1 April 2004, the tax was not shown separately but was included in the price). At that time, the percentage of points earned was 5%, and in cases where payment was made in cash, with J Debit or prepaid e-money this was increased to 10%, for credit cards and store finance it was increased from 3% to 8% (Visa debit cards that subsequently appeared on the market were also 8%). Furthermore, an additional rate may also be added with specific products and for a limited time period. The percentage of points added with credit cards was increased to 10% on 25 June 2015, the same as for cash, for users who standardized their points information at "Yodobashi.com"

=== Gold Point Card – Plus ===
Compatibility with the Edy payment system was ended in the middle of May 2012 and updates to existing cards or re-issue results in a change to cards without Edy compatibility.

== Controversies ==
There was a trial where a temporary worker as well as the worker's mother, Harimi Shimoda (a writer), sought compensatory damages of ¥18 million yen from Yodobashi Camera, employees of the temping agency and others. The worker was dispatched to the Yodobashi Camera mobile phone sales department where he was subsequently told that he "does not smile enough". In the trial, the Tokyo District Court (Kenichi Kato, presiding judge) rendered a judgment ordering that Yodobashi Camera employees, Yodobashi Camera and the employees of the temping agency and the temping agency itself pay total compensation of approximately 5.6 million yen.

This temporary worker was affiliated with a temping agency in the Shibuya ward of Tokyo from October 2002 to March 2003. The worker was working under an illegal two-layer dispatch structure with the temping agency DDI Pocket (now Softbank Mobile) Yodobashi Camera. The worker endured acts of violence committed against him on more than 4 occasions by temping agency employees and Yodobashi Camera employees.

The judgment recognized the facts of the violence as claimed by the plaintiff and ordered the Yodobashi employees and Yodobashi to pay damages of one hundred thousand yen on account of the assault by the Yodobashi employees. Furthermore, although the temping agency and its employees were ordered to pay combined damages of about 1.5 million yen, any responsibility of the employees of Yodobashi Camera and DDI Pocket was denied. Some people involved in the judicial field have criticized this judgment as being unfair and skewed too far to the side of the companies involved, because the responsibilities of the companies using the employee's services were not recognized despite the fact that the victim suffered violence within the company premises.
