= Huawei IDEOS =

Mobile phone manufactured by Huawei

Huawei IDEOS U8150
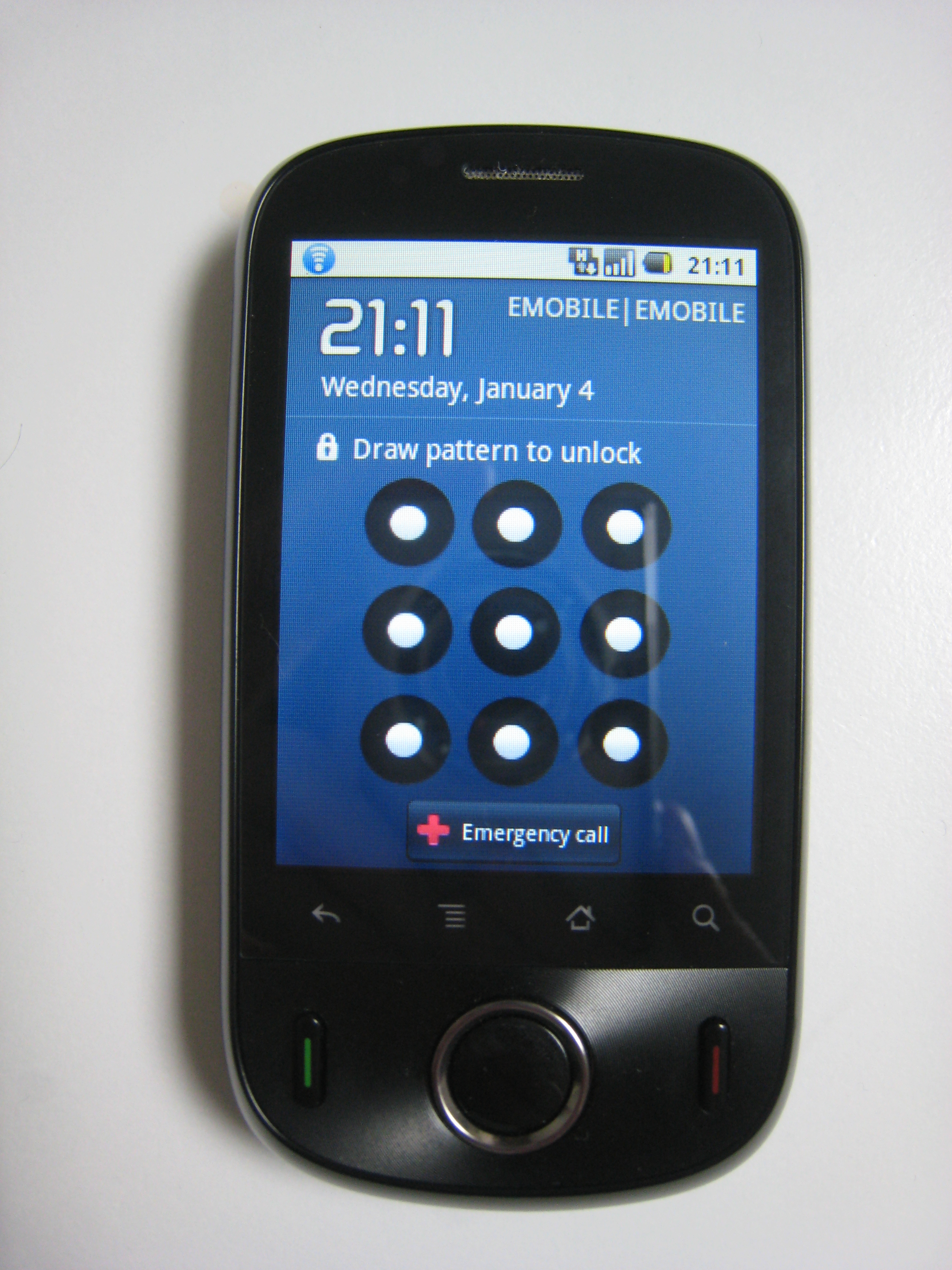
- Manufacturer: Huawei
- Type: Smartphone
- Availability by region: September 2010; 15 years ago
- Form factor: Bar
- Dimensions: 104 mm (4.1 in) H 54.8 mm (2.16 in) W 13.5 mm (0.53 in) D
- Weight: 0.1021 kg (0.225 lb)
- Operating system: Android 2.2 "Froyo"
- CPU: Qualcomm MSM7225 528 MHz ARM 11
- Memory: 256 MB (RAM)
- Storage: 200 MB
- Removable storage: microSD up to 32 GB
- Battery: Li-ion 1200 mAh
- Rear camera: 3.16 megapixel
- Display: 2.8 in (71 mm) 320×240 px
- Connectivity: HSPA, Bluetooth 2.1, Micro-USB, audio jack, aGPS, Wi-Fi 802.11 b/g/n
- Data inputs: Capacitive touchscreen, Accelerometer, Proximity, Magnetometer

The Huawei IDEOS U8150 is an Android smartphone manufactured by Huawei.

It is rebranded as S31HW by EMOBILE in Japan. It is also renamed the T-Mobile Comet in the United States.

== Features ==
The U8150 features a 2.8-inch glass capacitive touchscreen. It also features a 3.16 megapixel fixed-focus camera, Bluetooth connectivity, built-in GPS/AGPS. A microSD slot is located under the phone's battery cover.

Physical buttons are the power button, a volume control on the side of the phone, a call start button, a navigation pad, and a call end button.

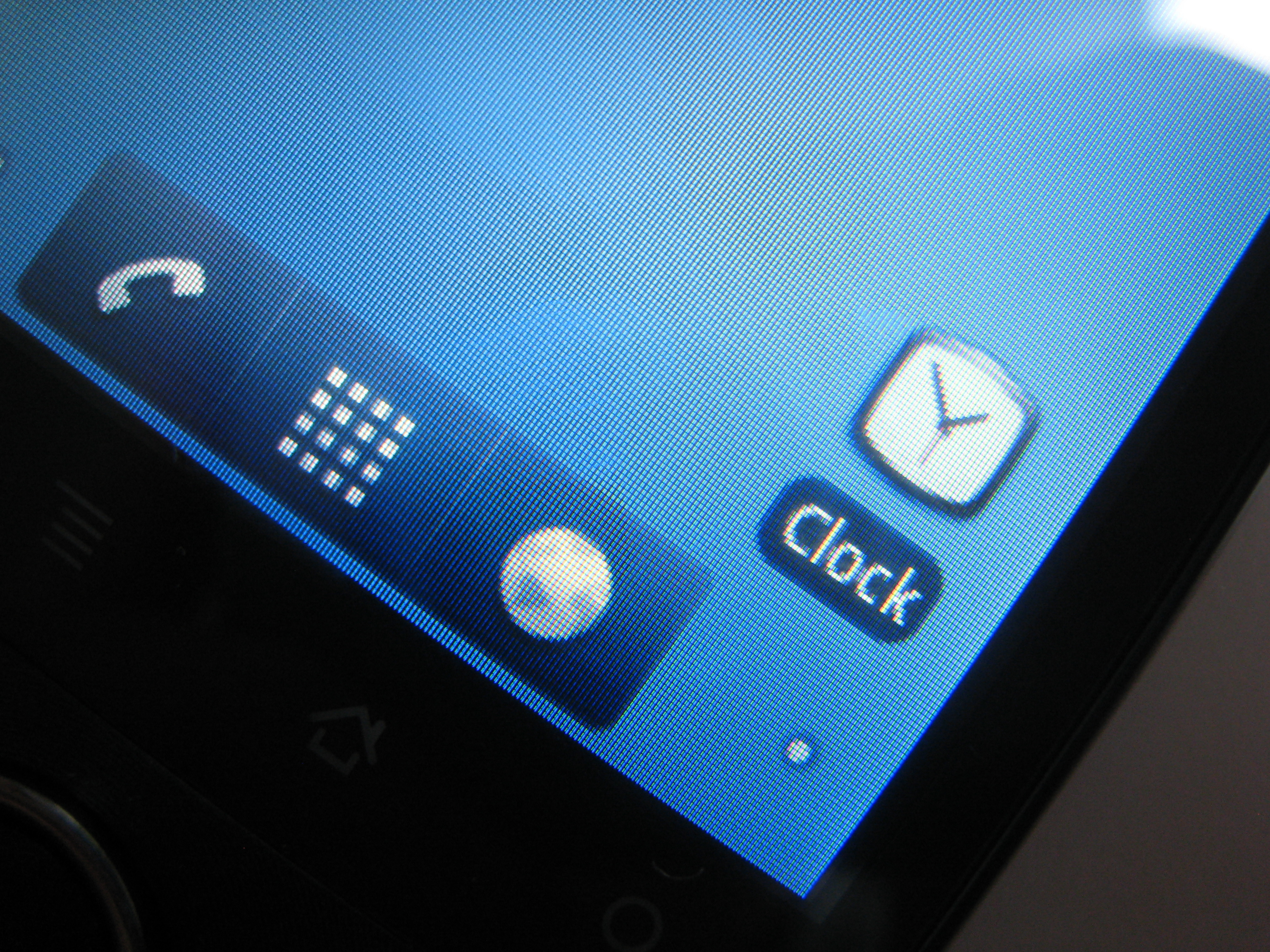
Close-up view showing the phone's rather low resolution
