= Asahi Net International =

Asahi Net International was a subsidiary company of ASAHI Net, Inc. ASAHI Net, Inc. transferred its 100% stake in Asahi Net International, Inc. to LMS Development Holdings, Inc. on April 28, 2015. The company subsequently changed its name to Scriba Corporation.

== History ==
In April 2011, ASAHI Net, Inc. established Asahi Net International, Inc. in New York, USA to promote its cloud-based educational support service manaba outside Japan. In April 2013, Asahi Net International, Inc. acquired the Sakai Learning Management division of rSmart, a service provider that had co-founded the Open Source Portfolio initiative and has been a major contributor to the Sakai project since the formation of the Sakai open source community. ASAHI Net, Inc. transferred its 100% stake in Asahi Net International, Inc. to LMS Development Holdings, Inc. on April 28, 2015. The company changed its name to Scriba Corporation. Scriba Corporation provided Sakai CLE and its support for colleges and universities. Scriba Corporation was located in Mesa, Arizona. In the early summer of 2016, Scriba unexpectedly dropped its LMS service for the University of California, Davis which supports over 30,000 students. The university IT department was able to recreate the provided Sakai (software) based service in just over a week, but not without significant data loss which the company failed to ever account for.

== See also ==
- History of virtual learning environments
- Virtual learning environment
