= MIQ (vocalist) =

Japanese singer

- Born: October 3, 1955 (age 70)
- Origin: Minato, Tokyo, Japan
- Genres: Anison
- Occupation: Singer
- Instrument: Vocalist
- Years active: 1982–present
- Labels: King Records; Victor Entertainment

MIQ (三玖, Miku; born October 3, 1955), previously known as MIO, is a Japanese pop singer and vocal trainer from Minato, Tokyo. She is known for her performances on the soundtracks of various anime, notably the theme songs of Sunrise's Combat Mecha Xabungle, Aura Battler Dunbine, Heavy Metal L-Gaim, Star Musketeer Bismark and Mobile Suit Gundam 0083 Stardust Memory. The throaty, soulful timbre of her voice was uncharacteristic of Japanese vocalists of the 1980s (although it has become more commonplace today).

MIQ has listed Aretha Franklin, Anita Baker, and Chaka Khan as influences on her vocal style. Her vocal delivery was a major reason she was signed to a contract with King Records. She is also fairly fluent in English as is evident by her English renditions of "Dunbine Tobu" and "Time for L-Gaim" and noted by fellow anime theme singer Ichirou Mizuki at ANIME JAPAN FES IN HK 2007 in Hong Kong.

== Partial discography ==
- "HEY YOU" – Combat Mecha Xabungle Insert song (1982)
- "Amnesia Grass" (わすれ草, Wasuregusa) – Combat Mecha Xabungle Insert song (1982)
- "GET IT!" – Xabungle Grafiti Theme song (1983)
- "Dunbine Flies" (ダンバインとぶ, Danbain Tobu) – Aura Battler Dunbine Opening Theme (1983)
- "Look It's Byston Well" (みえるだろうバイストン・ウェル, Mierudarō Baisuton Weru) – Aura Battler Dunbine Ending Theme (1983)
- "Time For L-Gaim" (エルガイム-Time for L.GAIM-, Erugaimu -Time for L.GAIM-) – Heavy Metal L-Gaim Opening Theme (1984)
- "Starlight Shower" (スターライト・シャワー, Sutāraito Shawā) – Heavy Metal L-Gaim Ending Theme (1984)
- "Grief's Destiny" (悲しみのDESTINY, Kanasimi no DESTINY) – Area 88 OVA Ending Theme (1985)
- "Call Me Mysterious" (不思議CALL ME, Fushigi CALL ME) – Sei Jūshi Bismarck Opening Theme (1985)
- "Galaxy Dream" (夢銀河, Yume Ginga) – Sei Jūshi Bismarck Ending Theme (1985)
- "MEN OF DESTINY" – Mobile Suit Gundam 0083: Stardust Memory Opening Theme (1991)
- "Evergreen" – Mobile Suit Gundam 0083: Stardust Memory Ending Theme (1991)
- "Hot Wind! Strong Wind! Cybuster" (熱風!疾風!サイバスター, Neppū! Shippū! Saibasutā) – Super Robot Wars Original Generation (2006)
- "Song of Yodobashi Camera" (ヨドバシカメラの歌, Yodobashi Kamera no Uta) – Commercial for Yodobashi Camera (1991)
- "ICE MAN" – Super Robot Wars Alpha – (2000)
- "Extreme Ki!" – Juken Sentai Gekiranger Insert song (2007)

== Albums ==
- スターライト・シャワー (1984)
- Mr. Monday Morning (1985)
- aesthetic (1986)
- Best of MIQ-MIQUEST-魂は刻をこえて・・・ (2005)
- MIO(MIQ)パーフェクト・ベスト (2011)
- STARLIGHT SHOWER (2012)
- Mr. Monday Morning (2012)
