= Sachio Semmoto =

Japanese businessman

- 千本 倖生
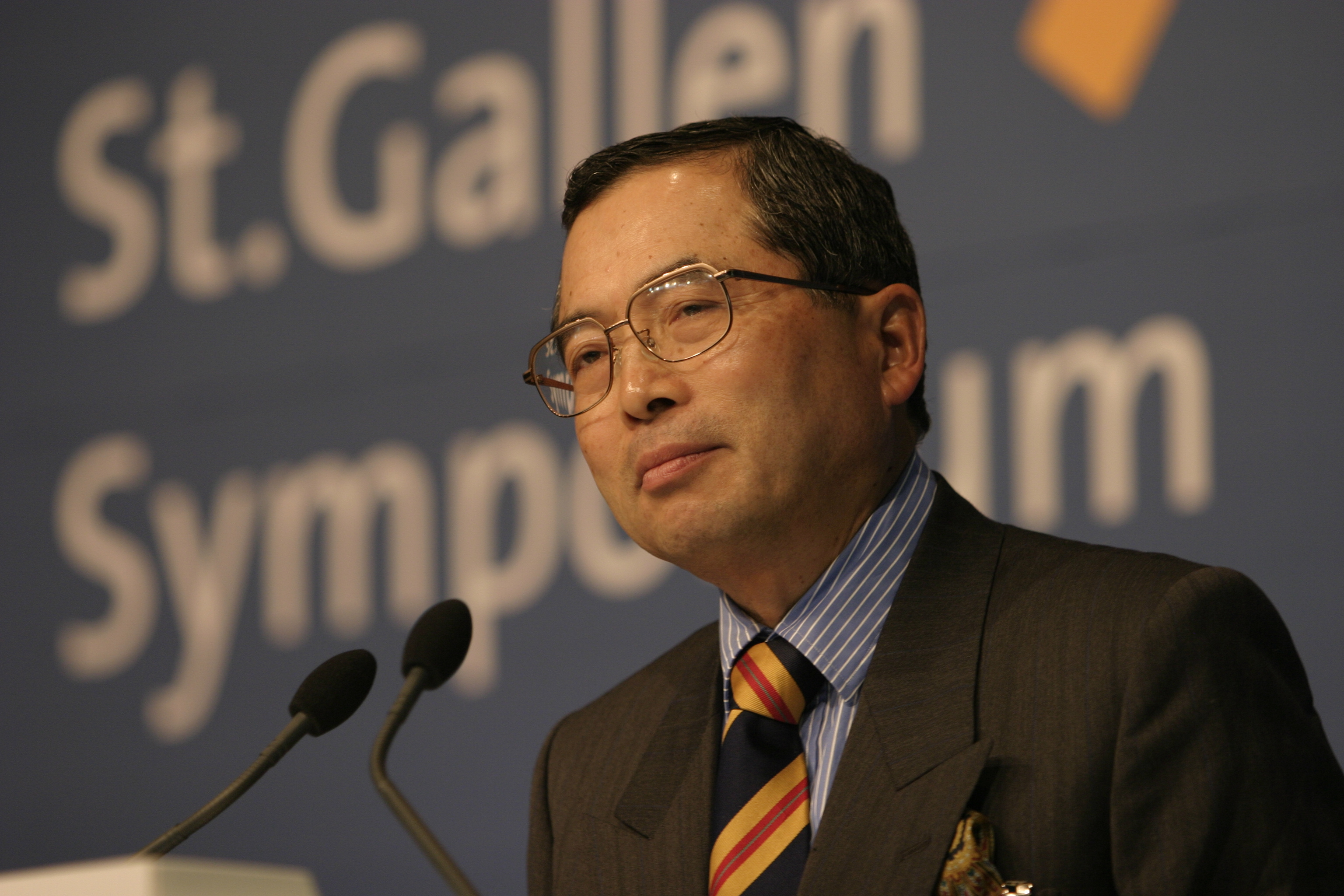
- Semmoto in 2006
- Born: September 9, 1942 (age 83); Nara Prefecture
- Education: University of Florida; Kyoto University
- Known for: Being the CEO of eAccess

Sachio Semmoto (千本 倖生, Senmoto Sachio; born 1942-09-09 in Nara Prefecture) is the current chairman and CEO of eAccess and eMobile, a Japanese telecommunication company. On March 24, 2009, he was also appointed as a director to the Telecom Corporation of New Zealand Limited.

Semmoto has also served on the Board of Directors for Softbank and the Sega Corporation. Semmoto received his bachelor's degree from Kyoto University and his M.S. and Ph.D. degrees from the University of Florida.
