= ASAHI Net =

Japanese internet service provider

Asahi Net, Inc.
- Native name: 株式会社朝日ネット
- Type: Public
- Traded as: TYO: 3834
- Industry: Internet, Education
- Founded: Tokyo, Japan (April 2, 1990)
- Headquarters: Tokyo, Japan,
- Area served: Japan, USA, worldwide
- Key people: Jiro Hijikata, President
- Revenue: 7,828 million yen (Financial Results for the Year Ended March 31, 2015)
- Net income: 883 million yen (Financial Results for the Year Ended March 31, 2015)
- Total assets: 10,102 million yen (March 2015)
- Number of employees: 108 (March 2015)
- Website: asahinet.com/en/

ASAHI Net is a major Internet service provider based in Japan and which is operated by Asahi Net, Inc. (株式会社朝日ネット, Kabushiki Gaisha Asahi Net), a public company founded on April 2, 1990. Asahi Net, Inc. has been listed on the First Section of the Tokyo Stock Exchange since December 2007. It offers low-price ADSL, fiber and mobile broadband Internet connection services across Japan as well as related services. ASAHI Net also operates cloud services for educational institutions and corporations.

ASAHI Net was ranked as No. 1 FTTH Internet service provider in customer satisfaction in 2010 in a customer satisfaction survey by J.D. Power. There are about 537,000 ASAHI Net Internet service subscribers as of September 2013.

== Internet service provider ==
Asahi PC Net was developed in 1988 as a service for PC communications based on the ideals of “communication” and “creation”. Functionality such as forums, virtual conference rooms and chats where users were identified by their real names were among the distinguishing features of the service. Due to collaborations with literary writers such as Yasutaka Tsutsui, and mutual integration with services such as IBM Japan's People service, Asahi PC Net became known as a humanistic network.

In 1994, the Asahi Net service was launched as an Internet connection service, and the company became a pioneer in providing service to businesses and organizations through its MMJP company website service. Currently, Asahi Net provides the largest 1 Gbit/s high speed optic fiber network, as well as ADSL, WiMAX and FOMA mobile broadband networks across Japan.

=== ASAHI Net Services ===
==== Internet services ====
Optic fiber service

Service Name	Network Carrier	Maximum speeds	Type	Target market	Fixed IP utilization	Notes
ASAHI Net FTTH with FLET’S	NTT	1 Gbit/s (download)	Residential	Individuals and businesses	Possible	Provides the only 1 Gbit/s service in the NTT West area.
ASAHI Net au Hikari	KDDI	1 Gbit/s (download)	Residential	Individuals and businesses	Not supported	
FLET’S Hikari Next	NTT	200 Mbit/s (download)	Residential	Individuals and businesses	Possible	
B FLET’S	NTT	100 Mbit/s (download)	Residential	Individuals and businesses	Possible	
FLET’S Hikari Premium	NTT	100 Mbit/s (download)	Residential	Individuals and businesses	Possible	

Mobile broadband service

Service Name	Network Carrier	Maximum speeds	Type	Target market	Fixed IP utilization	Notes
ASAHI Net LTE	NTT Docomo	150 Mbit/s (download)	-	Individuals and businesses	Possible	
ASAHI Mobile WiMAX	UQ Communications	40 Mbit/s (download)	-	Individuals and businesses	Possible	
Asahi Net WiMAX 2+	UQ Communications	220 Mbit/s (download)	-	Individuals and businesses	Possible	
High Speed Mobile (Xi & FOMA)	NTT Docomo	37.5 Mbit/s (download)	-	Individuals and businesses	Possible	
Neo-discount Mobile	eMobile	7.2 Mbit/s (download)	-	Individuals and businesses	Possible	
Wi-Fi Wi2	Wire and Wireless, Inc.	300 Mbit/s (download)	-	Individuals and businesses	Not supported	Public WiFi service. 30,000 locations across Japan in the BB mobile, Wi2 300 and UQ WiFi network.
Wi-Fi FLETS Spot	NTT	54 Mbit/s (download)	-	Individuals and businesses	Not supported	Public WiFi service. 9,000 locations across Japan.
AIR-EDGE	Willcom, Inc.	512 kbit/s (download)	-	Individuals and businesses	Not supported	
PacketWIN	KDDI	9.2 Mbit/s (download)	-	Individuals and businesses	Not supported	

ADSL service

Service Name	Network Carrier	Maximum speeds	Type	Target market	Fixed IP utilization	Notes
FLET’S ADSL	NTT	47Mbit/s (download)	Residential	Individuals and businesses	Possible	
Neo-discount ADSL	eAccess	50Mbit/s (download)	Residential	Individuals and businesses	Not supported	

- Related services
  - Fixed IP address
  - Email service
  - Security services
  - Blog and web design services
  - ASP groupware
  - Content services
  - Green services and CSR

== History ==
- April 1990 - ATSON, Inc. (currently, ASAHI Net, Inc.) is established as a subsidiary of Asahi Shimbun and provides the ASAHI PC Net service.
- July 1993 - Main service is renamed ASAHI Net from ASAHI PC Net.
- March 1994 – Mutual access with IBM Japan's “People” network is established.
- June 1994 – Internet connection service established.
- February 1995 – MMJP service is established, aimed at corporations and institutions.
- June 1995 – Personal website creation service established.
- December 1997 – Established contract with largest Internet provider in the United States at the time, UUNET, to obtain access to 500 access points in the United States.
- March 2000 – ATSON, Inc. becomes an independent company through a management buyout.
- December 2000 – ADSL service established.
- January 2001 – Company name is changed to ASAHI Net, Inc.
- October 2001 – Fiber optic Internet service is established.
- March 2003 – VoIP Internet telephony service established.
- April 2003 – Subscriber number reaches 30,000.
- December 2003 – Ranked No.1 in Nikkei Net Navi ISP ranking.
- October 2004 – Spam blocking service established.
- March 2005 – AsaOne ASP groupware service is established.
- March 2005 – AsaBlo blogging service is established.
- June 2005 – ASAHI Net Hikari with FLET’S service is established.
- April 2006 – ASAHI Net TV, a high-speed broadband service for television connection, is established.
- December 2006 – Company stocks trade on the Second Section of the Tokyo Stock Exchange.
- February 2007 – Launched manaba cloud service for educational institutions.
- November 2007 – Subscriber number reaches 400,000.
- December 2007 – Company stocks trade on the First Section of the Tokyo Stock Exchange.
- December 2007 – Ranked No. 1 Internet service provider in Japan by J.D. Power.
- July 2008 – Ranked No. 1 Internet service provider in Japan by Nikkei business magazine.
- September 2009 – Subscriber number reaches 450,000.
- September 2011 – Subscriber number reaches 500,000.
- October 2011 – ASAHI Mobile WiMAX service is established.
- November 2012 – FLET’S Hikari WiFi service for small size apartment complexes is established.
- March 2013 – ASAHI Net LTE service for Internet connection using a SIM card is established.
- February 2014 – Asahi Net WiMAX 2+ service is established.
- September 2014 – Asahi Net Omakase Router service is established.

== Security ==
Asahi Net, Inc. is regularly audited by a third party to comply with the ISO/IEC 27001:2005 international ISMS standard.
