= Ymobile =

Japanese company

SoftBank Corp. T/A Y!mobile
- Founded: 1 June 2014; 12 years ago
- Defunct: 1 April 2015; 11 years ago (as independent company)
- Headquarters: Shiodome-building 1-9-1 Higashi-shinbashi, Minato-ku, Tokyo, Japan
- Owner: SoftBank (100%)
- Website: www.ymobile.jp

Y!mobile is a Japanese mobile phone operator. Y!mobile is a brand used by SoftBank Corp., a subsidiary of Japanese telecommunications company SoftBank Group Corporation, that provides mobile telecommunications and ADSL services. The current CEO of the company is Ken Miyauchi. It was formed in 2014 through the merger of Willcom and eAccess, and uses the Y! moniker brand from Yahoo! Japan, which is partly owned by SoftBank.

On 1 April 2015, Ymobile Corporation merged into Softbank Mobile Corporation (now SoftBank Corporation), with the Y!mobile brand continuing to be used by the newly merged company.

== History ==
=== Willcom ===
Willcom logo

WILLCOM Inc. (株式会社ウィルコム, Kabushiki-gaisha Wirukomu) was a PHS operator based in Tokyo, offering flat-rate wireless network data transmission and flat-rate voice calls for its subscribers. The company was founded as a planning-company in 1994, and started to offer telephony services in 1995 under the brand DDI-Pocket. Its PHS network covered almost all of Japan, and had the largest share of the Japanese PHS market. It continued operating after other PHS operators had withdrawn their services. The company later became a subsidiary of KDDI. Willcom Okinawa Co., Ltd. was a subsidiary for operations in Okinawa.

In 2004, the Carlyle Group acquired a majority stake from KDDI and spun off DDI Pocket in February 2005, with the new company called Willcom. The number of its subscribers passed four million on May 29, 2006.

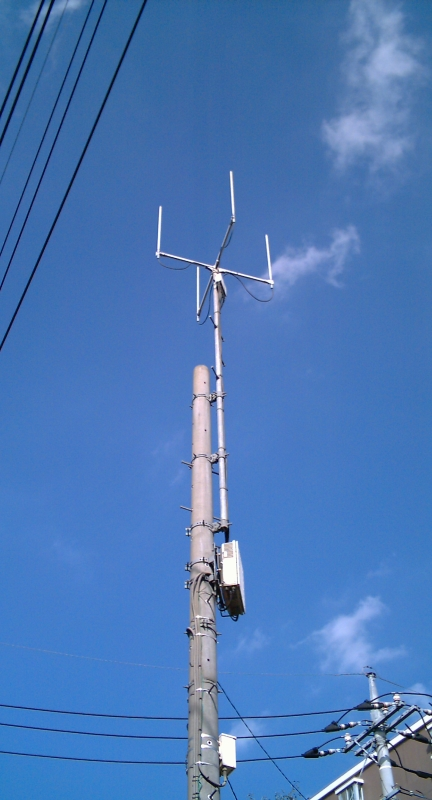
A Willcom PHS phone tower in Tokorozawa, Saitama, in 2006

As an operator, it had mainly base stations of 500mW-radio output, unlike other PHS operators, which had mainly built 20 mW base stations. The high output level caused some radio interference and it was difficult to place calls in dense areas such as Shinjuku, Tokyo during the network's early days, although these problems were eventually solved. On the other hand, high output (and sensitivity) can also earn wider coverage of area per base station, therefore the operator was able to expand its coverage faster than the competition. The market between PHS operators and cellular telephony companies was incredibly fierce, and until October 1996 it was not possible to make calls between PHS and cellular telephones. Even then, charges for calls between the two different systems were high.

PHS became popular because of its lower cost, causing cellular telephone companies to reduce their rates, which were initially considered too expensive. Furthermore, the coverage of the cellular companies quickly expanded to comparable levels. With the competitive advantage of PHS reduced, DDI-Pocket went through difficult years at the end of the 1990s and the beginning of the 2000s. The declining market for PHS service has caused the launch of its flat-rate service and its buyout by Carlyle.

Logo of eAccess

On February 18, 2010, Willcom filed for bankruptcy with 206 billion yen in liabilities. This took place after Willcom was unable to reschedule its debt payments; the company had been losing subscribers to competing networks with greater data speeds. In December 2010 SoftBank purchased 100% of shares issued by Willcom. Willcom was in the process of rehabilitation under the Corporate Rehabilitation Act.

On June 1, 2014, Willcom was merged with eAccess and formed Ymobile.

=== eAccess and EMOBILE ===
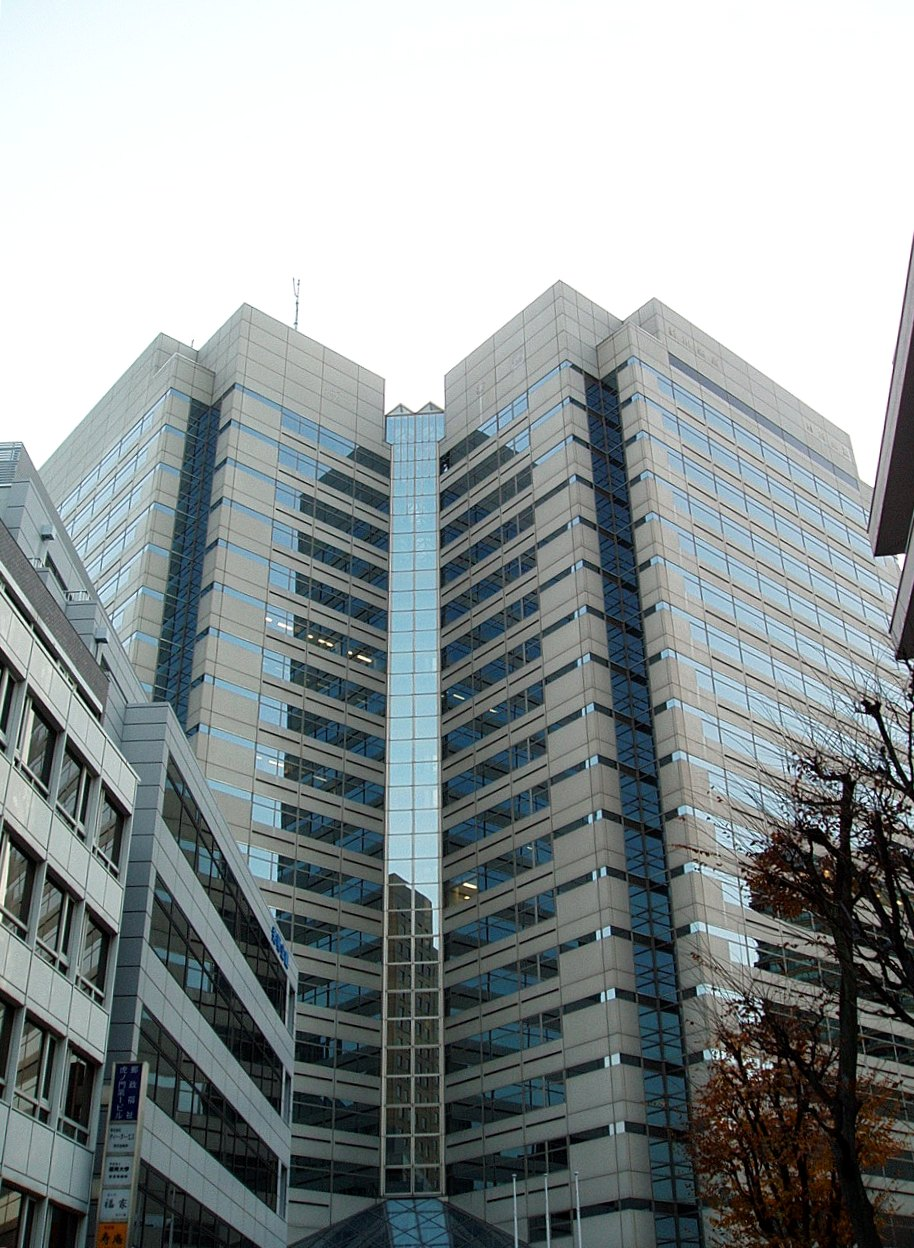
The Toranomon Twin Building in Minato-ku, Tokyo, headquarters of eAccess

The company eAccess was established on November 1, 1999, by Dr Sachio Semmoto as an ADSL fixed line broadband provider. Semmoto founded EMOBILE Ltd. (イー・モバイル株式会社) on January 5, 2005, as a subsidiary of eAccess, offering 3G/HSPA+/DC-HSDPA/LTE services. As they used to offer only data services they were not widely known, but after teaming up with NTT DoCoMo to offer voice services, they became more popular. EMOBILE had a reseller/virtual network arrangement with several fixed-line ISPs including ASAHI Net. As of March 31, 2009 their website claimed 90% coverage of Japan's population.

As of April 17, 2009 EMOBILE introduced HSUPA to metropolitan areas claiming support for 5.8 Mbit/s. As of early 2011, 21 Mbit/s HSPA+ and 42 Mbit/s DC-HSPA+ is available in major metropolitan areas, depending upon the subscriber modem used. On March 15, 2012, they began offering LTE service with initial advertised speeds of 75 Mbit/s. It is claimed that this speed will eventually increase to 112 Mbit/s.

Total EMOBILE subscribers as of April 30, 2009 was 1.53 million.

On January 1, 2013, eAccess became a wholly owned subsidiary of SoftBank Corporation (now SoftBank Group Corporation). eAccess merged with Willcom to form Ymobile in July 2014.

== Gallery ==
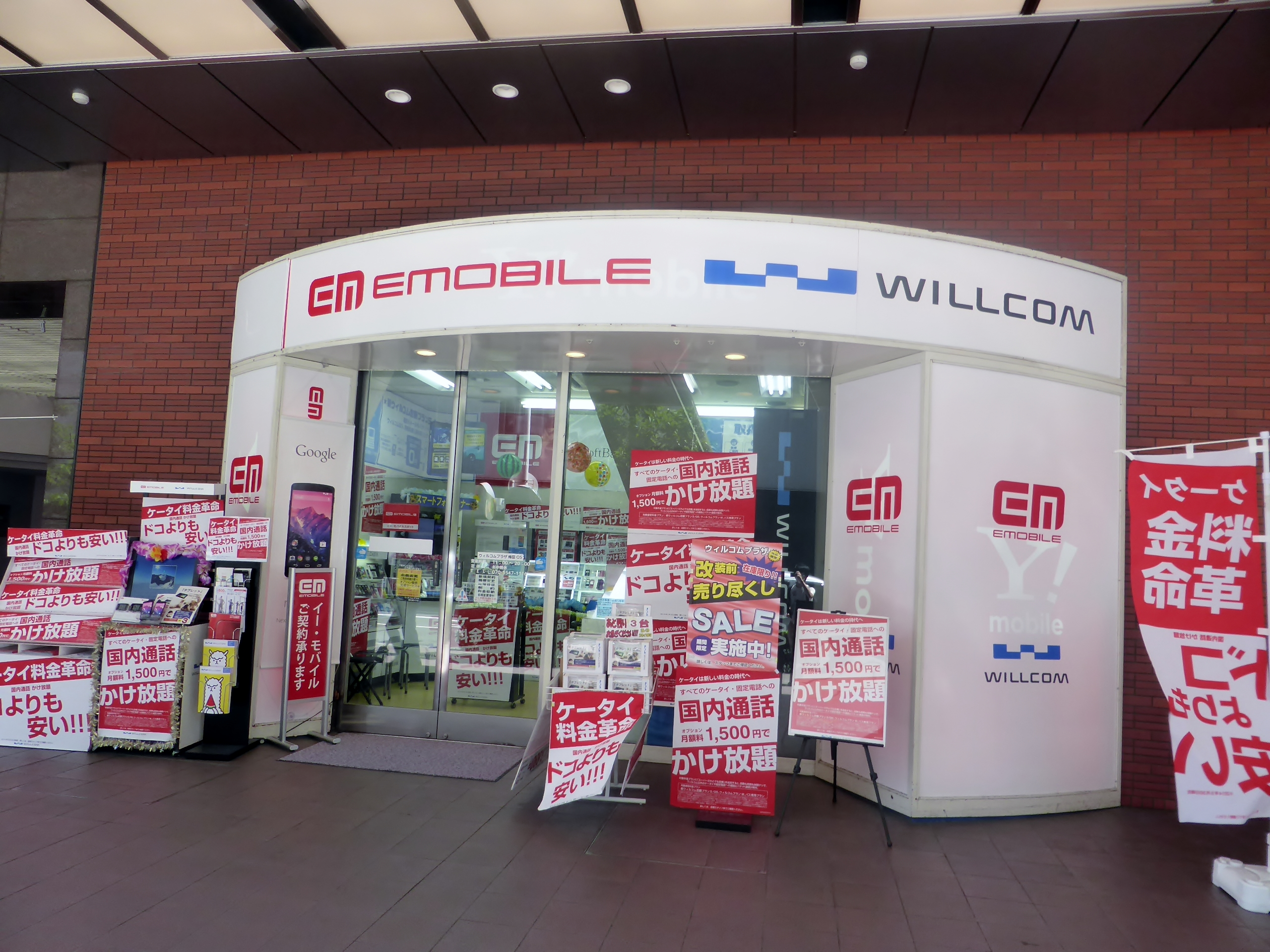
Willcom and EMOBILE signs at a plaza in 2014

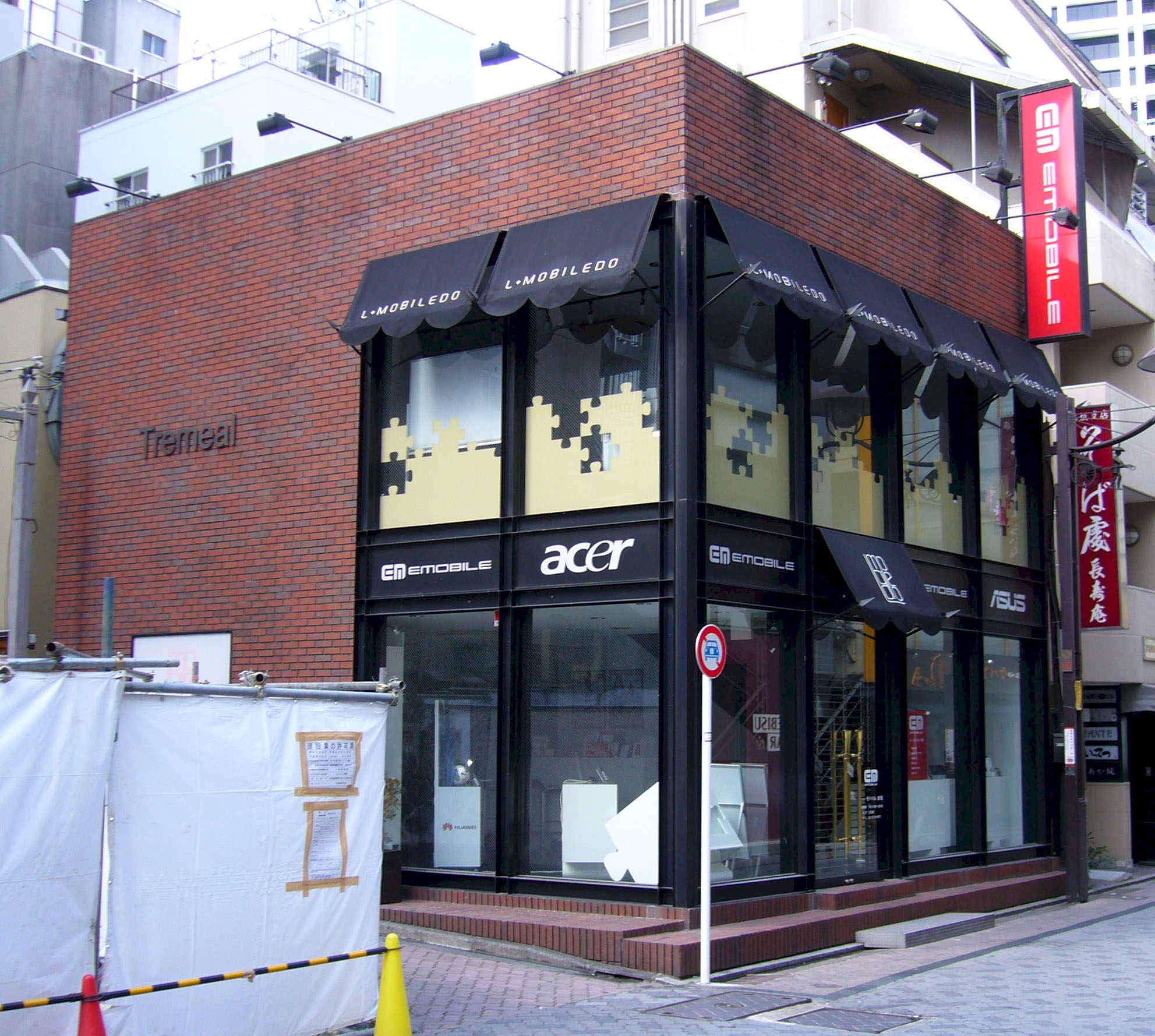
An EMOBILE store in Tokyo in 2012

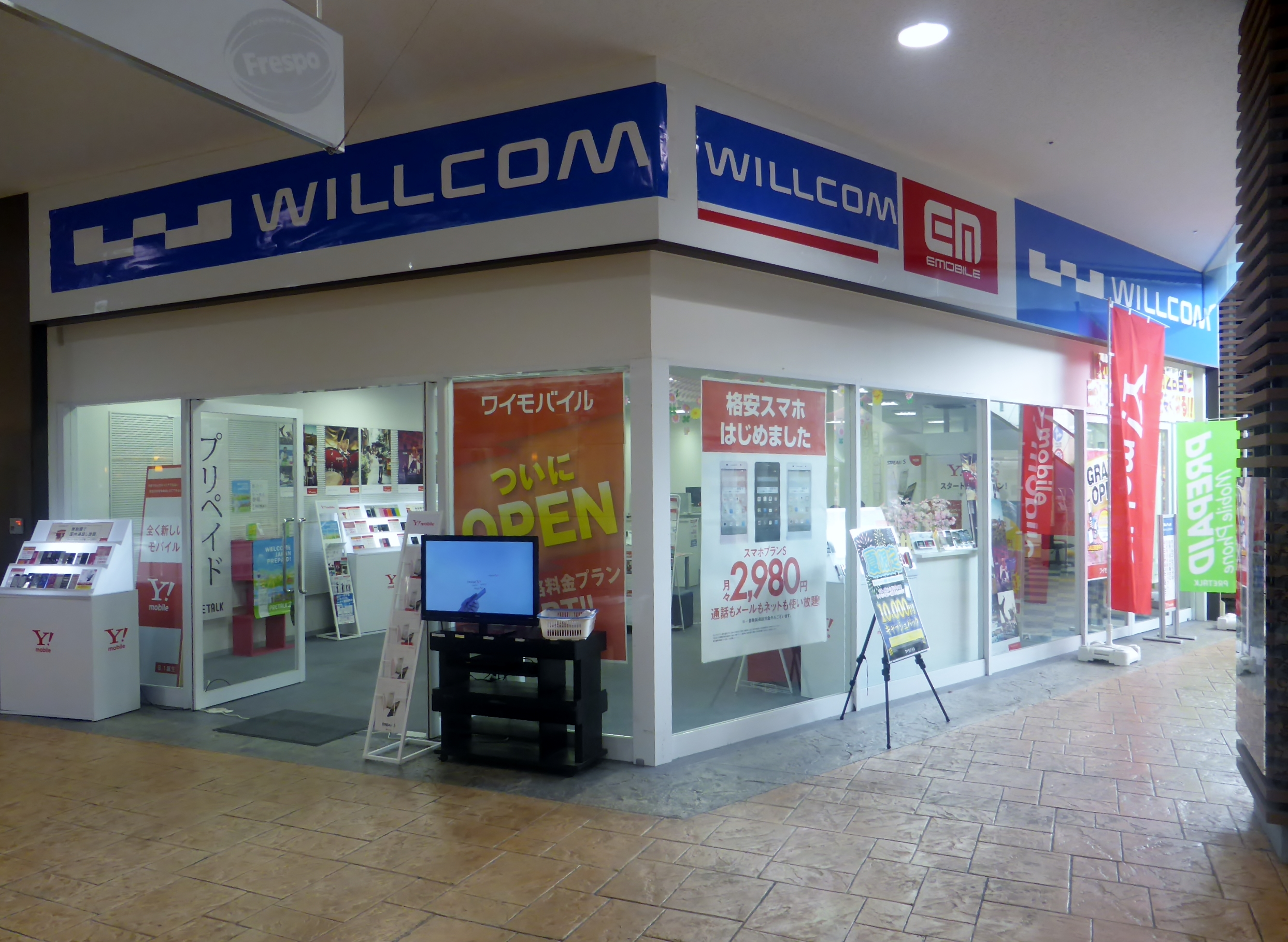
A Willcom/EMOBILE store in 2014

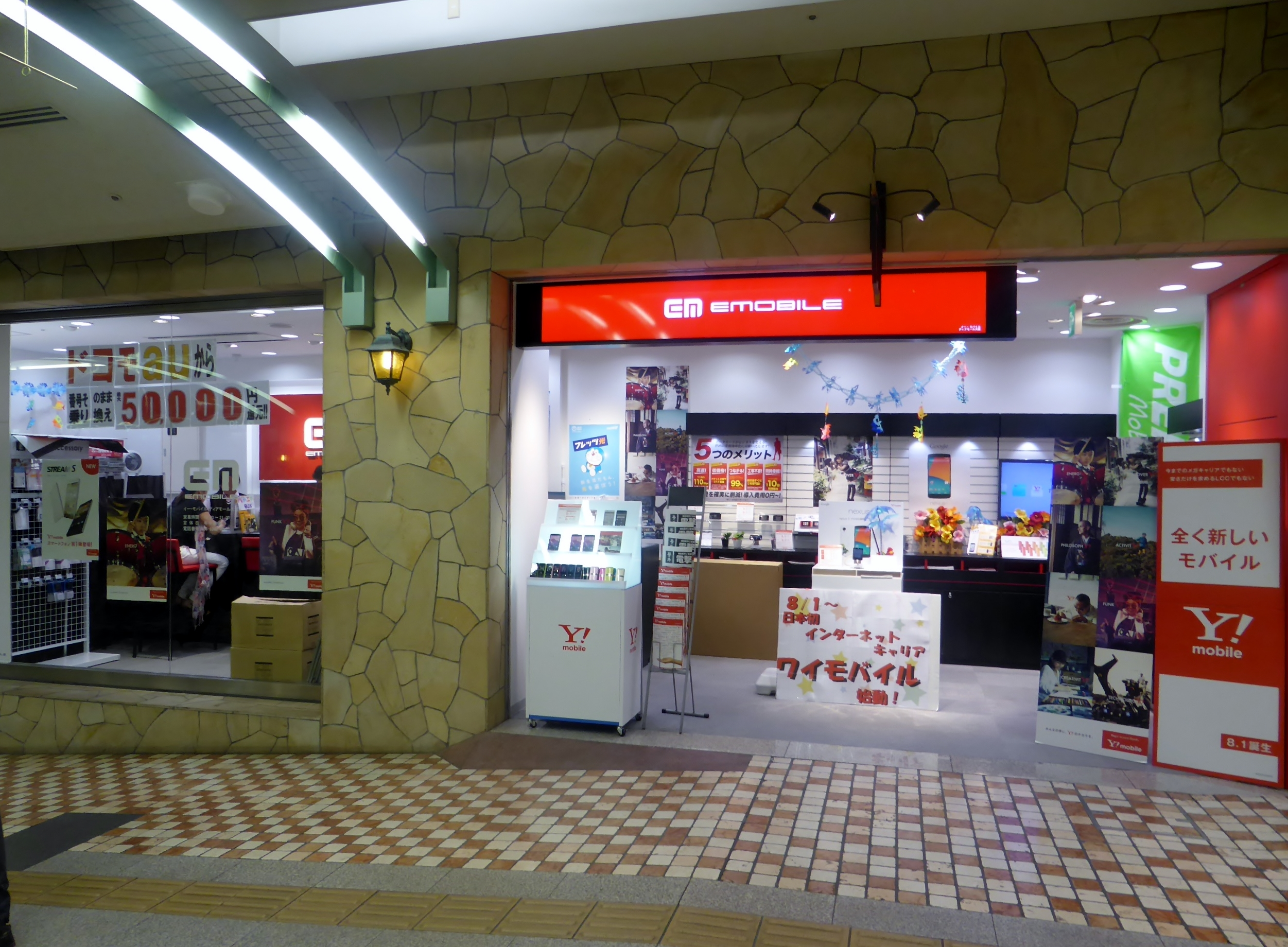
emobile store in 2014 (as Y! Mobile)

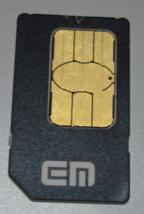
An EMOBILE UIM card

== See also ==
- SoftBank Mobile
- PHS
- W-SIM
- G-BOOK
- Enterprise Turnaround Initiative Corporation of Japan
