= Trade (finance) =

Exchange of a security for cash

In finance, a trade is an exchange of a security such as stocks, bonds, commodities, currencies, derivatives or any valuable financial instrument for "cash". Such a financial transaction is usually done by participants of an exchange such as a stock exchange, commodity exchange or futures exchange with a short-dated promise to pay in the currency of the country where the 'exchange' is located.

The price is agreed between the buyer and seller on the execution of the trade and is guided by the supply and demand for that financial instrument. Once the trade is executed a number of steps take place until the trade is finally settled. There is a pre-defined settlement period for this to happen in each market.

Trading in financial markets is key part of a countries economics, providing liquidity, enabling price discovery, and facilitating efficient capital allocation. When trading in financial markets, financial traders balance risk and potential reward to attempt to make profit from the trades.

== Life cycle ==
The securities trade life cycle involves:

1. Order initiation and execution. (Front office function)
2. Risk management and order routing. (Middle office function)
3. Order matching and conversion into trade. (Front office function)
4. Affirmation and confirmation. (back office function)
5. Clearing (back office function)
6. Settlement. (back office function)

== Participants ==
Participants in the financial markets include:

- Speculators or retail traders
- Institutional traders such as insurance companies, private funds, hedge funds
- Central banks such as the U.S. Federal Reserve(Fed), Bank of Japan (BOJ), European Central Bank (ECB)
- Corporations such as Multinational companies (MNCs)
- Governments

== See also ==
- Electronic trading platform
- Stockbroker
- Stock exchange
- Stock market
- Trader
