= Backoffice =

Backoffice may refer to:

- Back office, a part of a corporation
- Back office application, a software application that does not have a direct relation to customers
- Microsoft BackOffice Server
