= PolyU Faculty of Business =

Faculty of Business, The Hong Kong Polytechnic University
- 香港理工大學工商管理學院
- Motto: To be a leading business school in Asia
- Type: Public
- Established: 2002
- Affiliations: AACSB, EQUIS
- Dean: Professor Edwin Cheng
- Academic staff: 200
- Students: 5,000
- Location: Hung Hom, Kowloon, Hong Kong
- Website: www.fb.polyu.edu.hk

The Faculty of Business (FB, Chinese: 香港理工大學工商管理學院) at The Hong Kong Polytechnic University (PolyU) was established in 2002. It provides undergraduate and postgraduate programmes in Hong Kong and mainland China. Currently, FB consists of three schools/departments: School of Accounting and Finance, Department of Logistics and Maritime Studies and Department of Management and Marketing.

== Reputation ==
- 17th in the world according to the Worldwide Business Research Rankings compiled by Korea University Business School (KUBS).

== Programmes in Hong Kong ==
Offered by the Faculty of Business

- Doctor of Philosophy (Ph.D.)
- Doctor of Business Administration (DBA)
- Doctor of FinTech (DFinTech)
- Master of Business Administration (MBA)
- Master of Science (MSc) in Business Management
- Master of Science (MSc) in China Business Studies
- Broad Discipline of Business (Undergraduate Programme)

Offered by School of Accounting and Finance

- Master of Corporate Governance
- Master of Finance – Financial Economics in Energy and Environment
- Master of Finance – Investment Management
- Master of Finance – Corporate Finance
- Master of / Postgraduate Diploma (PgD) in Professional Accounting
- Master of Science (MSc) in Accountancy
- Bachelor of Business Administration (Honours) in Accountancy
- Bachelor of Business Administration (Honours) in Accounting and Finance
- Bachelor of Business Administration (Honours) in Financial Services

Offered by Department of Logistics and Maritime Studies

- Master of Science (MSc) in Global Business and Decision Analysis
- Master of Science (MSc) / Postgraduate Diploma (PgD) in Global Supply Chain Management
- Master of Science (MSc) / Postgraduate Diploma (PgD) in International Shipping and Transport Logistics
- Master of Science (MSc) in Operations Management
- Bachelor of Business Administration (Honours) in International Shipping and Transport Logistics
- Bachelor of Business Administration (Honours) in Supply Chain Management and Analytics
- Bachelor of Business Administration (Honours) in Aviation Management and Finance

Offered by Department of Management and Marketing

- Master of Science (MSc) in Human Resource Management
- Master of Science (MSc) in Marketing Management
- Master of Science (MSc) in Business Analytics
- Bachelor of Business Administration (Honours) in Management
- Bachelor of Business Administration (Honours) in Marketing

== Programmes in Mainland China ==
- Doctor of Management (Cooperate with Renmin University of China)
- Master of Business Administration (MBA) (Cooperate with Xian Jiaotong University)
- Master of Science (MSc) in Quality Management (Cooperate with Zhejiang University)

== Research Centres ==
- Asian Centre for Branding and Marketing (ACBM)
- Center for Economic Sustainability and Entrepreneurial Finance (CESEF)
- Centre for Leadership & Innovation (CLI)
- C Y Tung International Centre for Maritime Studies (ICMS)
- IMC-Frank Tsao Maritime Library and Research & Development Centre (IMCC)
- Laboratory of Container Security (LCS)
- Logistics Research Centre (LRC)
- Shipping Research Centre (SRC)
- Sustainability Management Research Centre (SMRC)

== Notable alumni ==
- Xu Qin, Governor of Hebei
- Wang Jianzhou, former chairman of China Mobile
- Chang Xiaobing, former chairman of China Telecom
- Annie Au, a professional squash player who represents Hong Kong
