= SAP Anywhere =

Software package from SAP SE

- Developer: SAP SE
- Initial release: 20 October 2015; 10 years ago
- Written in: Java
- Available in: Chinese (Simplified), Chinese (Traditional), English
- Type: Reporting software
- License: SaaS
- Website: news.sap.com/tags/sap-anywhere/

SAP Anywhere is a front office software package from SAP for small and medium sized enterprises (SMBs). In early 2018, SAP decided to sunset the product in favor of its other software packages SAP Business One and SAP Business ByDesign ERP.

SAP Anywhere is a package of several front office applications that are intended to help businesses sell products and services in-store, through direct sales and online. This combination is marketed to businesses as helping them to achieve effective customer relationship management by allowing them to review and direct marketing, inventory, and customer experiences using a single system on their mobile devices.

== History ==
SAP Anywhere was launched by SAP and China Telecom on 20 October 2015, in Mainland China. SAP utilized the telecommunications infrastructure of China Telecom, and states that it developed a product customized for the Chinese market. According to SAP, initial plans for release focused on building a strong customer base in China before expanding to other markets. Due competitive pressure (according to SAP), SAP released SAP Anywhere to the English-speaking market earlier than planned. UK availability was announced in March 2016, and US availability was announced in May 2016. A Canadian pilot was planned for 2016.

== Features ==
SAP Anywhere is a cloud based SaaS, and can be accessed through mobile devices or desktops. It includes applications for: online stores, customer relationship management, digital marketing, Point of Sale, order fulfillment management, and inventory management. SAP Anywhere uses SAP HANA, a database system developed by SAP. SAP Anywhere integrates with Constant Contact and MailChimp, as well as, sometimes, internal and back office enterprise resource planning applications like HR and finance.

== See also ==
- Cloud computing
- Customer experience
- Front office
- List of SAP products
- Online shopping
