= Houston Astros sign stealing scandal =

2010s scandal in Major League Baseball

Houston Astros sign-stealing scandal
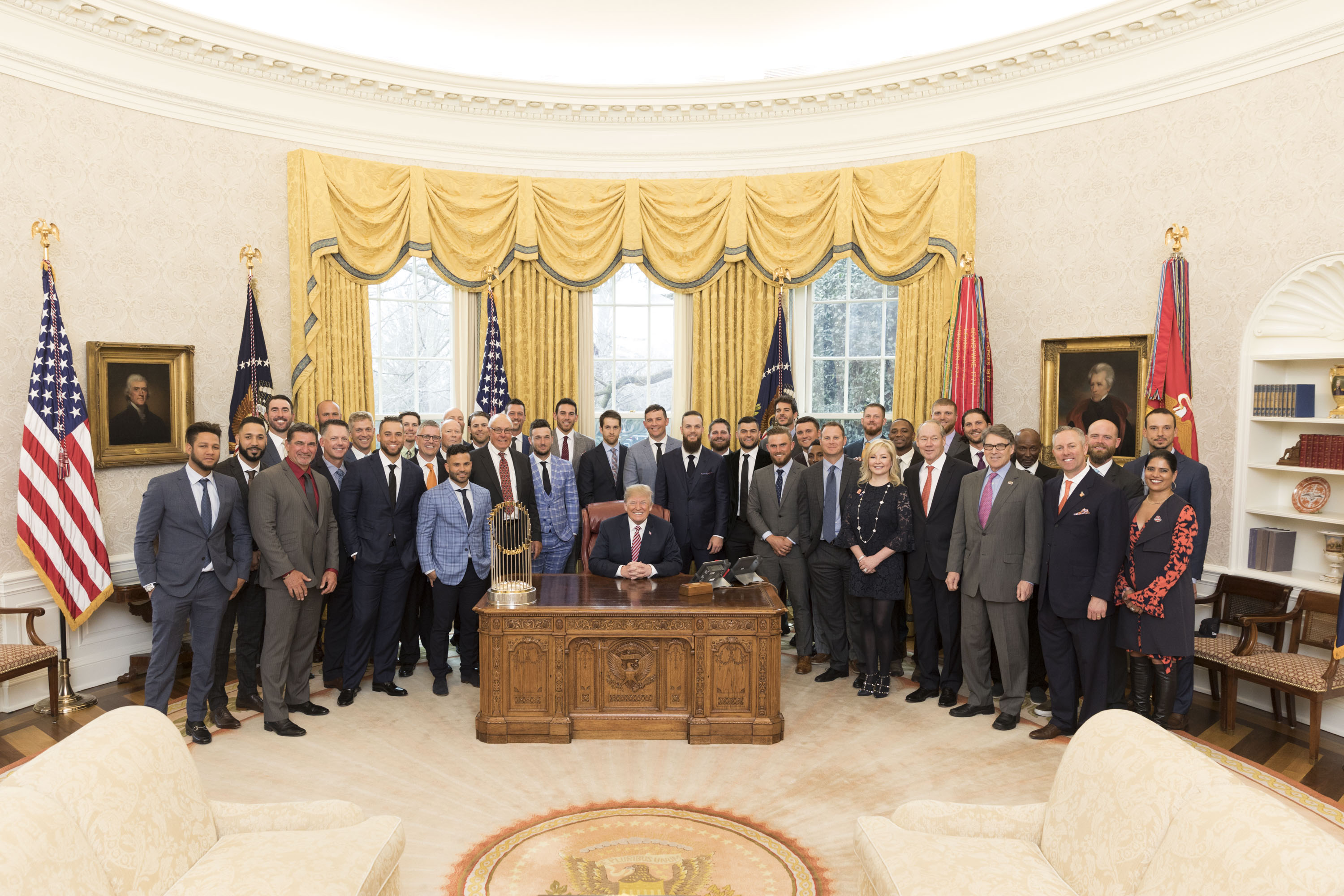
- The 2017 World Series champion Houston Astros visiting the White House; President Donald Trump is seated. The legitimacy of their victory came under question following the scandal.

The Houston Astros sign-stealing scandal in Major League Baseball (MLB) broke in November 2019. Several members of the Houston Astros management were disciplined for failing to prevent Astros players from illegally using a video camera system to steal signs from opposing teams during games in 2017 and 2018.

Other teams had long suspected the Astros of stealing signs, but there was no public reporting of it until November 2019, when reporters Ken Rosenthal and Evan Drellich at The Athletic published an article detailing the team's activities. Mike Fiers, a pitcher who played for the Astros in 2017, told The Athletic that the organization used a video camera in the center field seats to observe the opposing catcher as he instructed the pitcher about the next pitch. Astros players or team staffers watching the live camera feed behind the dugout used various audio cues, such as banging on a trash can, to tell the batter what type of pitch was coming next. An MLB investigation confirmed in January 2020 that the Astros illegally used a camera system to steal signs during the 2017 regular season and postseason, during which they won the World Series, as well as in part of the 2018 season, in which they lost the American League Championship Series to the Boston Red Sox. MLB found no evidence of illicit sign stealing in the 2019 season, in which the Astros advanced to the World Series, but lost in seven games to the Washington Nationals.

The sanctions against the Astros were the most severe that MLB has ever issued against a member club, and are among the most severe sanctions for in-game misconduct in North American professional sports history. MLB levied the maximum $5 million fine on the Astros and stripped them of their first- and second-round picks in the 2020 and 2021 drafts. The league suspended Astros general manager Jeff Luhnow and field manager A. J. Hinch for the 2020 season for failing to prevent the rule violations; the Astros only fired the two after their punishment was announced by MLB. MLB's investigation also determined that Red Sox manager Alex Cora helped mastermind the Astros' sign-stealing while serving as Hinch's bench coach in 2017. MLB suspended Cora through the 2020 postseason; he left the team but was rehired after his suspension ended. Carlos Beltrán was the only Astros player from 2017 named in the report; he had been hired to manage the New York Mets in November 2019 but parted ways with the team after the results of MLB's investigation were announced. No players were punished; MLB had granted them immunity in exchange for their cooperation. The Astros retained their 2017 World Series championship title.

A Wall Street Journal article published a few weeks after the MLB report revealed new details about the sign-stealing operation, including that it originated during the 2016 season. After the scandal broke, players on the 2017 Astros apologized to varying degrees. The team's actions were heavily criticized by players on other MLB teams. The scandal dominated the 2019–2020 offseason and the start of 2020 spring training. The scandal also led to lawsuits against the Astros and MLB.

== Background ==
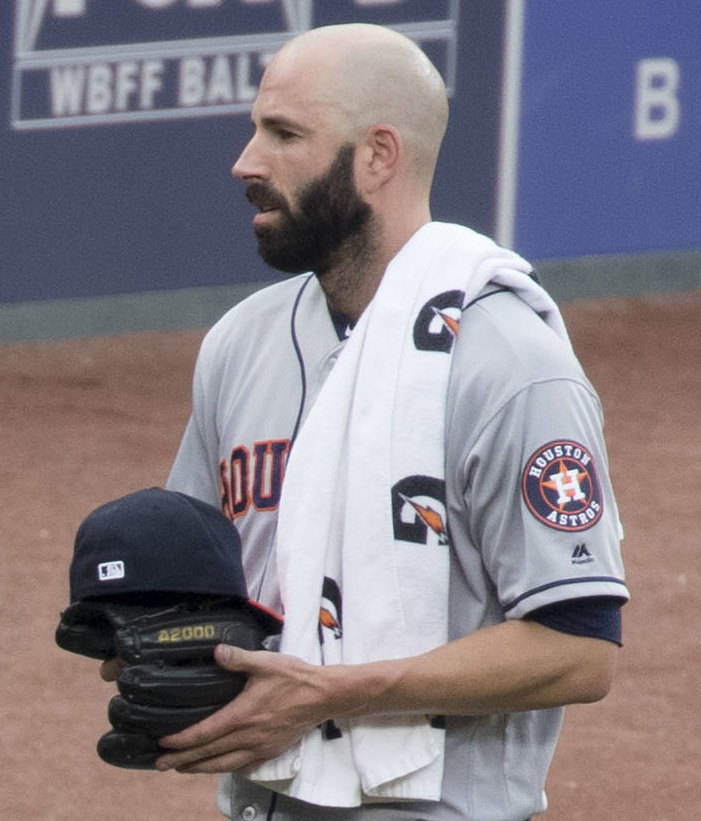
Pitcher Mike Fiers, pictured here with the Houston Astros in 2017, brought the scandal to light in November 2019 during an interview with reporters of The Athletic.

Sign stealing is not inherently against baseball rules and has long been considered part of the game, as it is considered an observational loophole. In 2017, The New York Times wrote that sign stealing was "something of an art form in baseball" which "is tolerated, even admired". Many players and coaches are considered masters at stealing signs.

However, Major League Baseball (MLB) has long frowned upon the use of technology to steal signs. In 1961, the National League (NL) banned the use of a "mechanical device" to steal signs. While MLB did not, at the time, specifically ban electronic equipment, it issued a memorandum in 2001 stating that teams cannot use electronic equipment to communicate with each other during games, especially for the purpose of stealing signs. In September 2017, after the Boston Red Sox were fined for using a smartwatch to try to steal signs, Commissioner of Baseball Rob Manfred issued a memo to all 30 clubs warning that future incidents of electronic sign stealing "will be subject to more serious sanctions, including the possible loss of draft picks".

In 2014, as part of the expansion of replay review in MLB, all 30 teams were permitted to install video replay rooms in their stadiums with live camera feeds, and the dugout was permitted to communicate with staffers in the room. MLB eventually realized that these rooms could be used for other purposes, including sign stealing. During the 2018 playoffs, a league official was stationed in each replay room.

Before the 2019 season, MLB reached an agreement with the MLB Players Association to restrict the use of live camera feeds. A league official would be stationed in each replay room. Only replay officials would be allowed to watch in real time; others could only watch with an eight-second delay. The new rules covered "all non-broadcast outfield cameras from foul pole to foul pole" and also tightened restrictions on scoreboard video.

The Astros finished in first place in the American League (AL) West division for the 2017 season with a win–loss record of 101–61. They defeated the Red Sox, three games to one, in the 2017 AL Division Series, including two wins at home at Minute Maid Park and one win away at Fenway Park. They defeated the New York Yankees in the 2017 AL Championship Series in seven games, winning all four home games at Minute Maid Park while losing all three road games at Yankee Stadium. In the World Series, the Astros defeated the Los Angeles Dodgers in seven games, going 2–2 at Dodger Stadium and 2–1 at Minute Maid Park. It was their first World Series championship in franchise history and the city's first championship since 1995. The Astros finished in first place in the AL West again in 2018 with a 103–59 record but lost the AL Championship Series to the Red Sox. Houston returned to the World Series in 2019 and in 2021, losing to the Washington Nationals and the Atlanta Braves, respectively. The Astros won the 2022 World Series over the Philadelphia Phillies.

== Speculation and accusations of sign stealing ==
Speculation about sign stealing by the Astros had been rampant for a number of years. The Astros were not the only team to be suspected of sign stealing; concern about electronic sign stealing was high around the league. After the scandal broke in 2019, many members of the Dodgers organization said that they had suspected the Astros were illegally stealing signs during the 2017 World Series. Andrew Friedman, the President of Baseball Operations for the Dodgers, stated that "there was just a lot of speculation at the time about it". The Cleveland Indians caught an Astros employee taking pictures of their dugout during the 2018 AL Division Series and warned the Red Sox, who faced the Astros in the AL Championship Series. The same man was found taking pictures of the Red Sox dugout in the AL Championship Series. The Yankees asked MLB to investigate whistling sounds that they believed were meant to relay signs to batters in Game 1 of the 2019 AL Championship Series, but MLB said they found no wrongdoing. Astros manager A. J. Hinch mocked the Yankees for the accusation, saying: "it made me laugh because it's ridiculous. And had I known that it would take something like that to set off the Yankees or any other team, we would have practiced it in spring training." The Yankees also reportedly alleged that the Astros were using blinking lights beyond the center-field fences to relay stolen signs in Game 6 of the series.

Before the 2019 World Series, MLB disciplinarian Joe Torre and other league officials held an unusual pre-series meeting with the GMs and managers of both teams to warn them against using cameras pointed at the dugouts or at catchers or using electronics in the dugout. Multiple Nationals players were contacted by other players around the league to warn them about the Astros. One unnamed Nationals player told The Washington Post, "It was amazing, once [it was assured] we were playing the Astros, how many people were coming out of the woodwork to let us know what they were doing." The Nationals developed a complex system of mixing signs to thwart any attempts by the Astros to steal signs in the World Series. The Nationals went on to beat the Astros by winning four away games at Minute Maid Park.

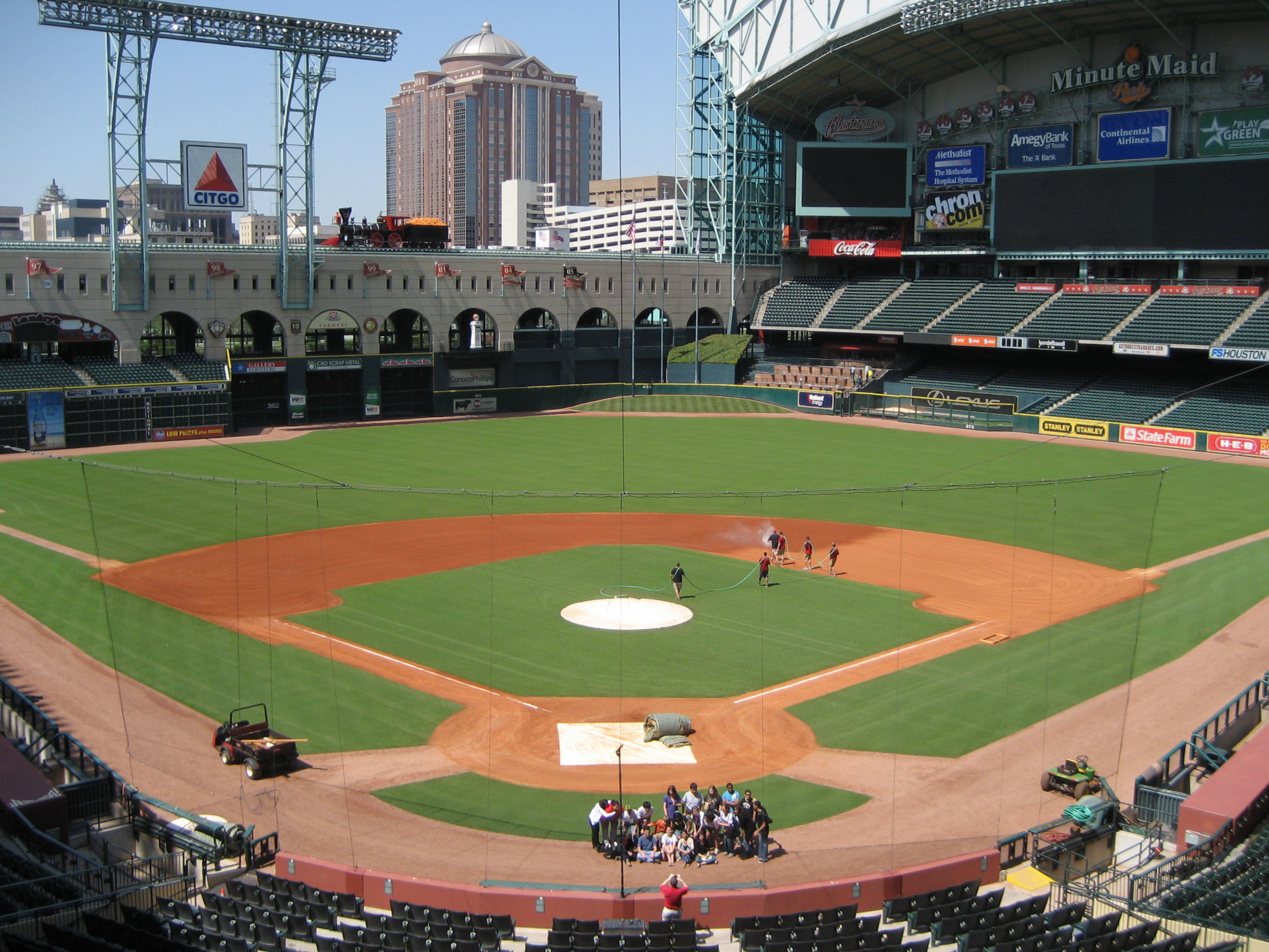
Minute Maid Park, the Astros' home ballpark, in 2010

On November 12, 2019, journalists Ken Rosenthal and Evan Drellich published a story in The Athletic, detailing for the first time specific allegations that the Astros had engaged in illicit electronic sign stealing. The article went to great lengths to emphasize that this was an MLB-wide problem, not a Houston Astros problem, and had come to be accepted as part of the culture of the game. Nonetheless, focus was placed on the Astros, both because of their on-field success since 2017, as well as the writers' ability to confirm the cheating done by the team, along with its methods of doing so, using five Astros players as sources. Four of those players chose to remain anonymous. Mike Fiers was the fifth, a pitcher who played for the Astros in 2017. Fiers stated that a center-field camera feed was sent to the tunnel behind the Astros dugout in Minute Maid Park. An Astros player or staff member then hit a trash can to signal specific different pitches to the batter at home plate. MLB began an investigation the day after the Athletic story was published. Jeff Luhnow, the general manager of the Astros, stated that the Astros organization was "going to look into the allegations in cooperation with Major League Baseball".

Internet sports personality Jimmy "Jomboy" O'Brien published videos on YouTube and Twitter, sourced from MLB.TV archives, that appeared to clearly show the scheme playing out in real time. In one such clip from an Astros game against the Chicago White Sox, banging could clearly be heard whenever White Sox catcher Kevan Smith called for pitcher Danny Farquhar to throw a changeup. The White Sox subsequently changed their signs to thwart the Astros. O'Brien argued that this "upsetting" sequence proved there was no way the Astros could have obtained the signs without the help of technology. Others on social media joined O'Brien in posting video clips alleging to demonstrate the Astros' sign-stealing scheme. Joon Lee from ESPN.com credited "social media sleuthing skills" with helping shape the league's investigation by reducing the amount of time needed to review video for evidence.

In a subsequent report from The Athletic, it was reported that an Astros executive had asked scouts for help stealing signs and suggested using cameras in an August 2017 email. Further allegations regarding other means of relaying signs, such as whistling, surfaced in subsequent weeks. There was also speculation that the Astros had developed more advanced ways to relay stolen signs to hitters. Joel Sherman of the New York Post reported, "In recent days I have had scouts and executives talk to me about a variety of methods they think have been or could be employed, such as a realistic-looking electronic bandage placed on a player's body that buzzes in real time to signal what is coming." According to a Washington Post report published in February 2020, as many as 10 to 12 teams had complained about potential sign stealing by the Astros over the years.

Most members of the Astros organization kept silent publicly throughout the investigation. The day after the original Athletic article, former Astros player Carlos Beltrán denied having knowledge of the alleged scheme. Hinch appeared at a press conference during the annual Winter Meetings and said he was cooperating with MLB but declined to comment further. In a January Houston Chronicle article published before MLB announced the findings from its investigation, Astros shortstop Carlos Correa expressed surprise that Fiers had made the accusations. Joe Musgrove said, "I wasn't even in the dugout for any of that stuff", while Alex Bregman and George Springer declined to comment.

Rosenthal wrote one week after the original report that he and Drellich "also heard—and continue to hear—about possible violations by a number of other clubs". Illicit sign stealing was a hot topic at the offseason GM meetings and Winter Meetings.

== MLB investigation report and discipline ==
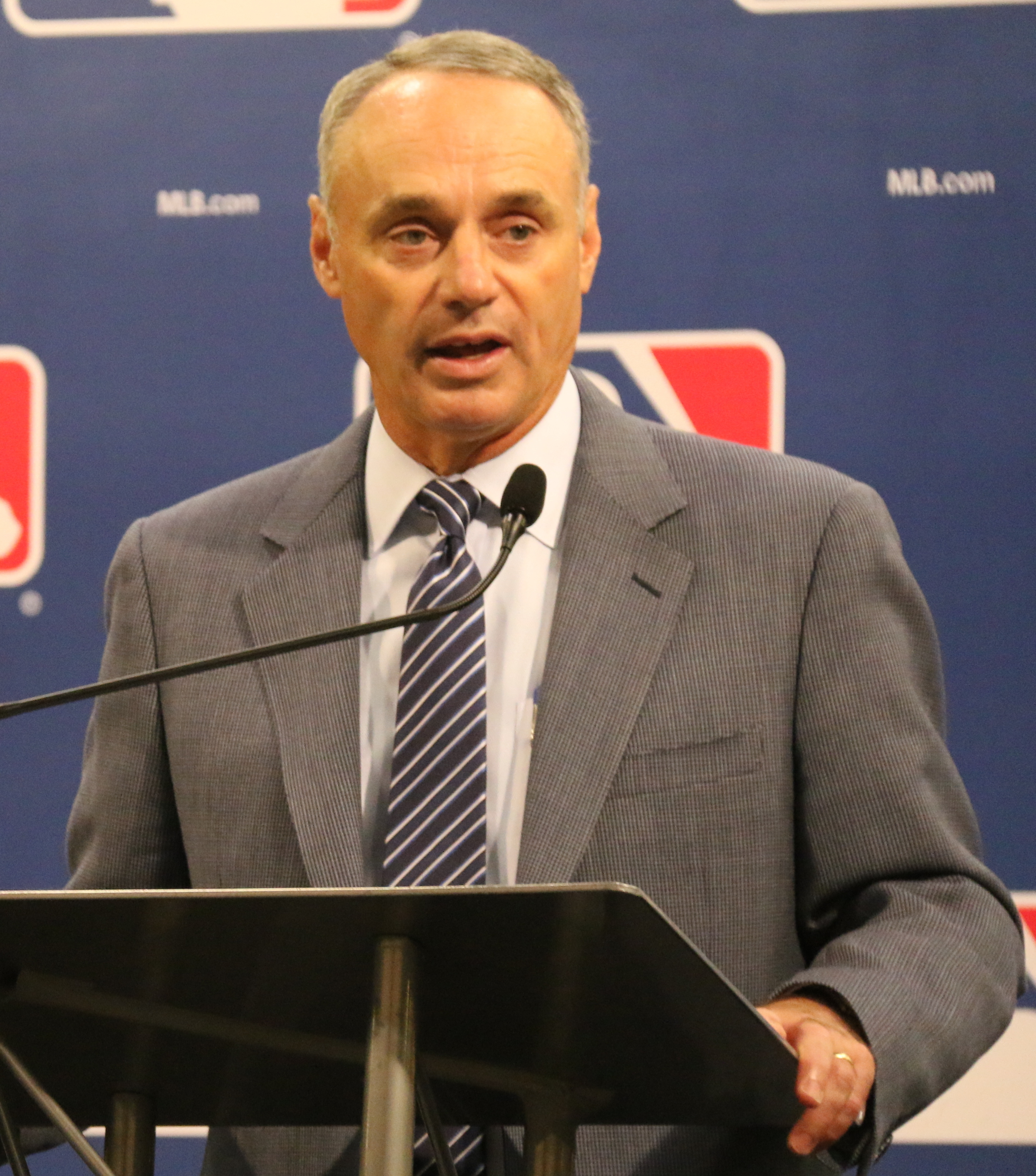
Commissioner Rob Manfred began an investigation into the Astros' sign stealing after The Athletic's article.

Days after The Athletic's article alleging the Astros' sign stealing, Manfred stated that MLB was conducting a "really, really thorough" investigation. During the investigation, it was publicly reported that witnesses admitted that the Astros used a system to relay pitch types to batters. In December 2019, Tom Verducci of Sports Illustrated reported that the investigation had expanded to cover the 2018 season, and that MLB investigators were combing through 70,000 emails and had conducted 70 interviews.

On January 13, 2020, Manfred announced the results of the investigation, confirming that the Astros had illegally used a video camera system to steal signs in the 2017 regular season and postseason, and in parts of the 2018 regular season. The report detailed that two months into the 2017 season, Astros bench coach Alex Cora and a group of players which included Beltrán worked to create a system to steal signs. One or more players would watch the live feed on a monitor behind the dugout, and decode the signs. The players initially experimented with clapping, whistling, and yelling, but determined banging a trash can with a bat was most effective. One or two bangs corresponded to a breaking ball, and no banging indicated a fastball. In addition to the banging method, Astros employees in the video room would also decode signs and send information to the dugout to be relayed to runners on second base who would relay signs to the batter. Players were concerned about their method being discovered by other teams, and several players said there was a sense of "panic" in the dugout after White Sox pitcher Danny Farquhar appeared to notice the banging in a September 2017 game. After the Farquhar incident, the Astros replaced the wall-mounted monitor and used a portable monitor in the postseason. The team continued using illicit methods to steal signs in the 2017 postseason (though Manfred later said there was "conflicting evidence" about whether it continued into the postseason or not). The Astros did not use the banging method in 2018, but continued to use other methods until players decided it was no longer effective and stopped at some point in the 2018 season. The investigation found no evidence of sign stealing in their pennant-winning 2019 season.

The Astros were fined $5 million, the maximum allowed by the MLB constitution, and forced to forfeit their first- and second-round draft picks in 2020 and 2021. In addition, Luhnow and Hinch were each suspended for the entire 2020 season, including the playoffs.

Hinch's year-long suspension was one of the most severe punishments in baseball history meted out to a manager for in-game misconduct. The only longer suspension handed out to a manager for in-game misconduct was to St. Louis Browns manager Jack O'Connor, who was permanently banned from baseball for trying to throw the 1910 American League batting title to Nap Lajoie by bribing the official scorer to change a hit on error to a hit in the final game of the season. Luhnow's year-long suspension was the longest meted out to an MLB executive since Atlanta Braves general manager John Coppolella was permanently banned in 2017 for numerous violations of MLB rules on signing international players.

The investigation revealed that Luhnow did not know about the banging scheme, though he had "some knowledge" about replay room staffers decoding signs and transmitting them to the dugout, contrary to his denials. Manfred found that while Luhnow did not know about the players' role in the scheme, he should have made it his business to know about the players' activities, especially in light of earlier sign-stealing scandals. According to Manfred, had Luhnow taken "adequate steps" to ensure the Astros followed the rules, the sign stealing operation could have been shut down as early as Manfred's September 2017 memo, and certainly by March 2018, when Torre issued a memo that clarified the ban on using technology to steal signs. Manfred wrote that since the general manager was responsible for ensuring compliance with "both standards of conduct set by Club ownership and MLB Rules", he was holding Luhnow "personally accountable for the conduct of his Club". He also criticized Luhnow for creating a baseball operation that emphasized "results over other considerations", which he believed allowed the sign stealing to continue for as long as it did. Manfred also believed that same culture allowed Luhnow's assistant Brandon Taubman to make misogynistic remarks to female reporters after the Astros clinched the 2019 pennant. Taubman was fired for lying about the comments, and was subsequently banned from baseball through at least the 2020 season.

The investigation found that Hinch did not approve of the use of the replay monitor in this manner, and even destroyed it on two occasions. However, he did allow it to continue through the team's run to the 2017 World Series. Manfred harshly criticized him for this, saying that since the manager is the direct supervisor of the players and coaches, there was "no justification for Hinch's failure to act". Although Hinch regretted his failure to act, Manfred said that he had to hold him responsible for it.

No players were punished because they had been given immunity by MLB in exchange for their cooperation with the investigation. MLB reportedly made the immunity deal with players because it believed it would not win grievances from the players union if it attempted to discipline players. In his report, Manfred said it was "difficult and impractical" to determine degrees of culpability by players due to the sheer number of players involved. He placed primary responsibility on Luhnow and Hinch, saying that the general manager and field manager are responsible for "ensuring that the players both understand the rules and adhere to them". If Luhnow and Hinch committed further "material violations" of baseball rules, they will be permanently banned from baseball. Additionally, Luhnow was required to undergo "management/leadership training" while suspended.

Subsequent reporting has revealed that of the approximately half the team that came to bat (pitchers did not hit in American League ballparks), there were four players who reportedly instructed teammates not to inform them of which pitch was coming: Jose Altuve, Brian McCann, Tony Kemp, and Josh Reddick.

== Firings ==
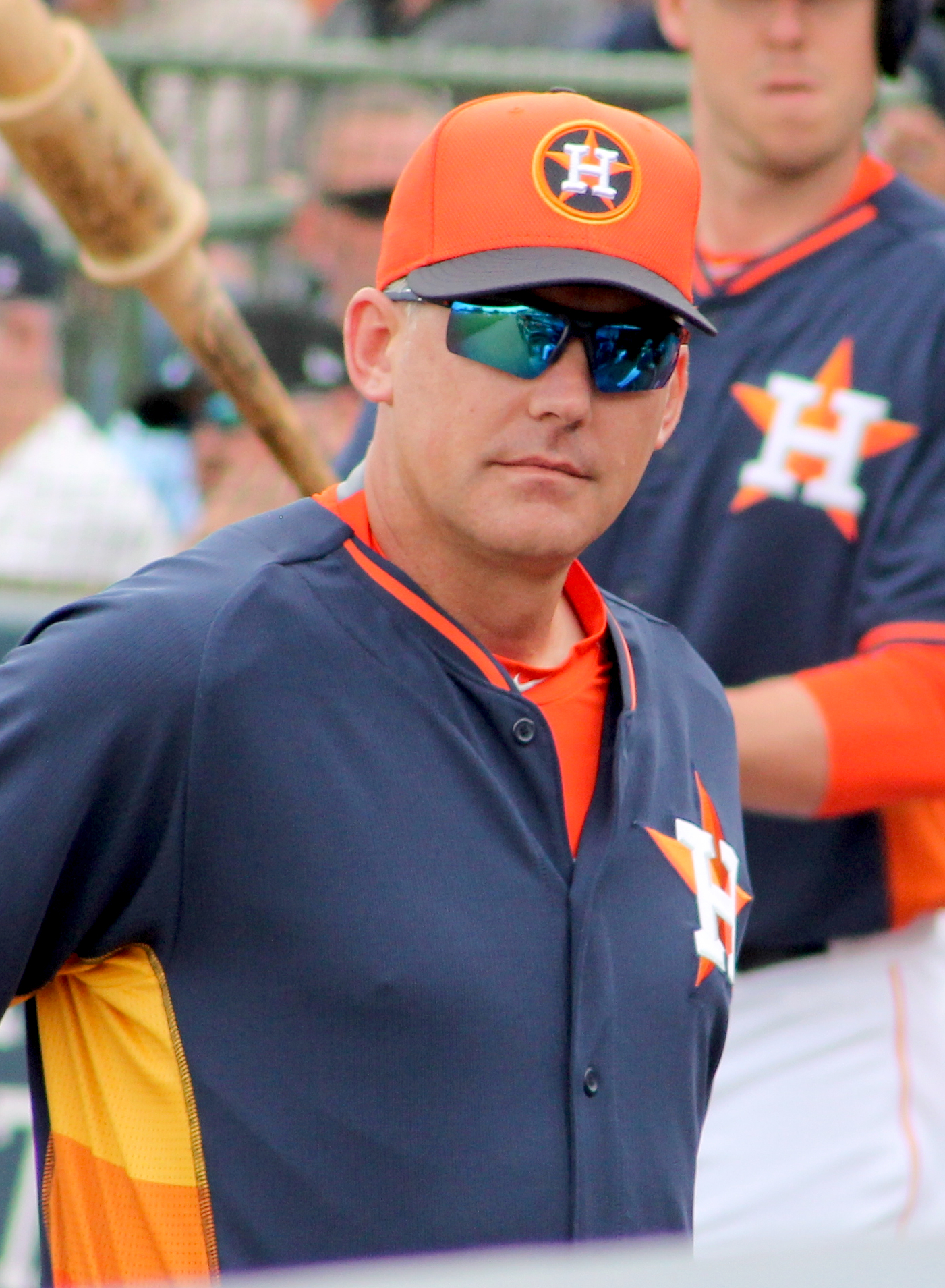
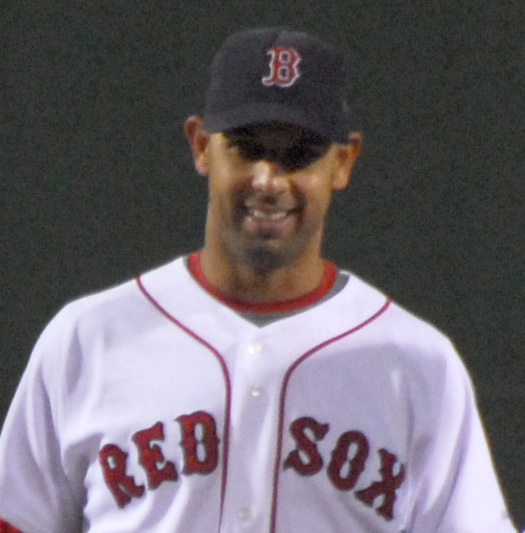
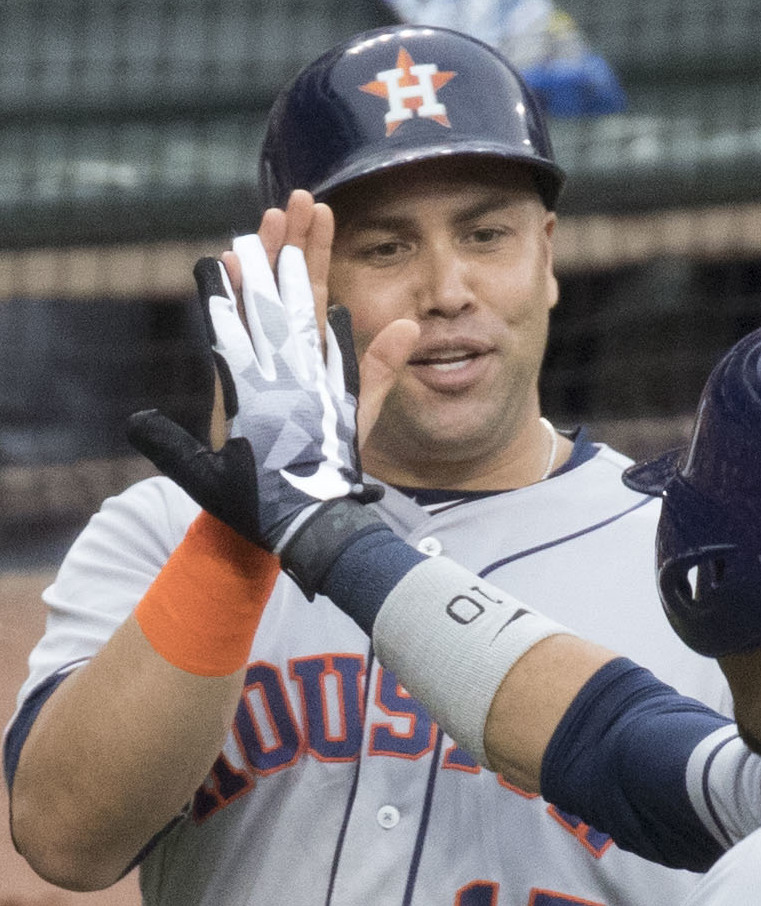
Three MLB managers lost their jobs as a result of their involvement in the scandal while with the Astros (from top to bottom): A. J. Hinch, Alex Cora, and Carlos Beltrán.

Only hours after MLB announced its findings, Astros owner Jim Crane fired Luhnow and Hinch, saying, "Neither one of them started this but neither one of them did anything about it." Crane said he was going beyond MLB's sanctions because he had "higher standards for the city and the franchise". Manfred had cleared Crane of wrongdoing at the beginning of his report, saying that Crane was "extraordinarily troubled and upset" by the revelations and had fully cooperated.

A day later, on January 14, 2020, the Red Sox and Cora — their manager at the time — mutually agreed to part ways as a result of his involvement in the scandal. The investigation found that Cora was closely involved in implementing the scheme, as well as using the replay room to decode signs. Based on those findings, both Cora and Red Sox officials concluded that he could not effectively lead the team into 2020 and beyond. Although Manfred deferred a decision on discipline for Cora until after a separate investigation into video sign stealing during the championship run by the 2018 Red Sox, it was widely expected that he would receive a lengthy suspension, at least as long as the one-year suspension meted out to Hinch. On April 22, 2020, Manfred issued findings from MLB's investigation about Boston's 2018 team. The findings focused on the actions of the team's replay operator, who as a result was suspended for the 2020 season (including postseason) and the team forfeited their second-round selection in the 2020 draft. About Cora, Manfred stated:

Alex Cora will be suspended through the conclusion of the 2020 Postseason for his conduct as the bench coach of the Houston Astros in 2017. While I will not impose additional discipline on Cora as a result of the conduct engaged in by [the Red Sox' replay operator] (because I do not find that he was aware of it), I do note that Cora did not effectively communicate to Red Sox players the sign-stealing rules that were in place for the 2018 season.

On January 16, 2020, the New York Mets and Beltrán—who was hired as their manager in the 2019–2020 offseason—mutually agreed to part ways, as he was the only then-Astros player called out by name for his involvement in the scheme. Beltrán never managed a game for the Mets. In a statement, he said: "As a veteran player on the team, I should've recognized the severity of the issue and truly regret the actions that were taken. I am a man of faith and integrity and what took place did not demonstrate those characteristics that are so very important to me and my family. I'm very sorry. It's not who I am as a father, a husband, a teammate and as an educator."

== Continued accusations ==
The report and discipline did not stop additional accusations of sign stealing from being made. The release of the report sparked a new frenzy of speculation and rumors on the internet in the week afterward. A Twitter account of a person claiming to be Beltrán's niece made accusations about non-Astros players around the league; Beltrán's family said the account was fake and some speculated that it actually belonged to a player. Rumors again circulated that Astros players were wearing buzzing electronic devices during the 2019 playoffs that would relay a stolen sign through vibrations, as originally speculated in a report in the New York Post. Jose Altuve released a statement through his agent stating, "I have never worn an electronic device in my performance as a major league player." A few days later in a media appearance, Altuve said "some people made that up...the best thing that happened to me was that MLB investigated it and found nothing." Josh Reddick called internet speculation that he was wearing a buzzing device "ridiculous", and Alex Bregman called the buzzer rumors "stupid".

== Reactions ==
=== Astros reactions ===
Josh Reddick was the first Astros player made available to speak to the media after the report, and he told reporters, "It stinks for everybody involved" and, "When everyone feels the time is right, it will get taken care of." Bregman and Jose Altuve appeared before the media at the Astros annual fan festival in Houston the week the report was released. Bregman answered repeated attempts by reporters to have him address the scandal with variations of the same phrase: "The commissioner made his report, made his decision and the Astros made their decision and I have no further comment on it." Altuve was more talkative but said it was too early to comment, saying, "I think the time to comment about that will come", while vowing that the Astros would return to the World Series.

After Bregman's and Altuve's comments were criticized, Crane promised that the team would hold a press conference at spring training when all the players were together to "apologize for what happened, ask for forgiveness and move forward". At the 2019 Baseball Writers' Association of America banquet, Justin Verlander, in his acceptance speech for winning the 2019 AL Cy Young Award, said of the Astros "as everybody knows, they're very technologically and analytically advanced", prompting a mix of boos and laughter from the audience.

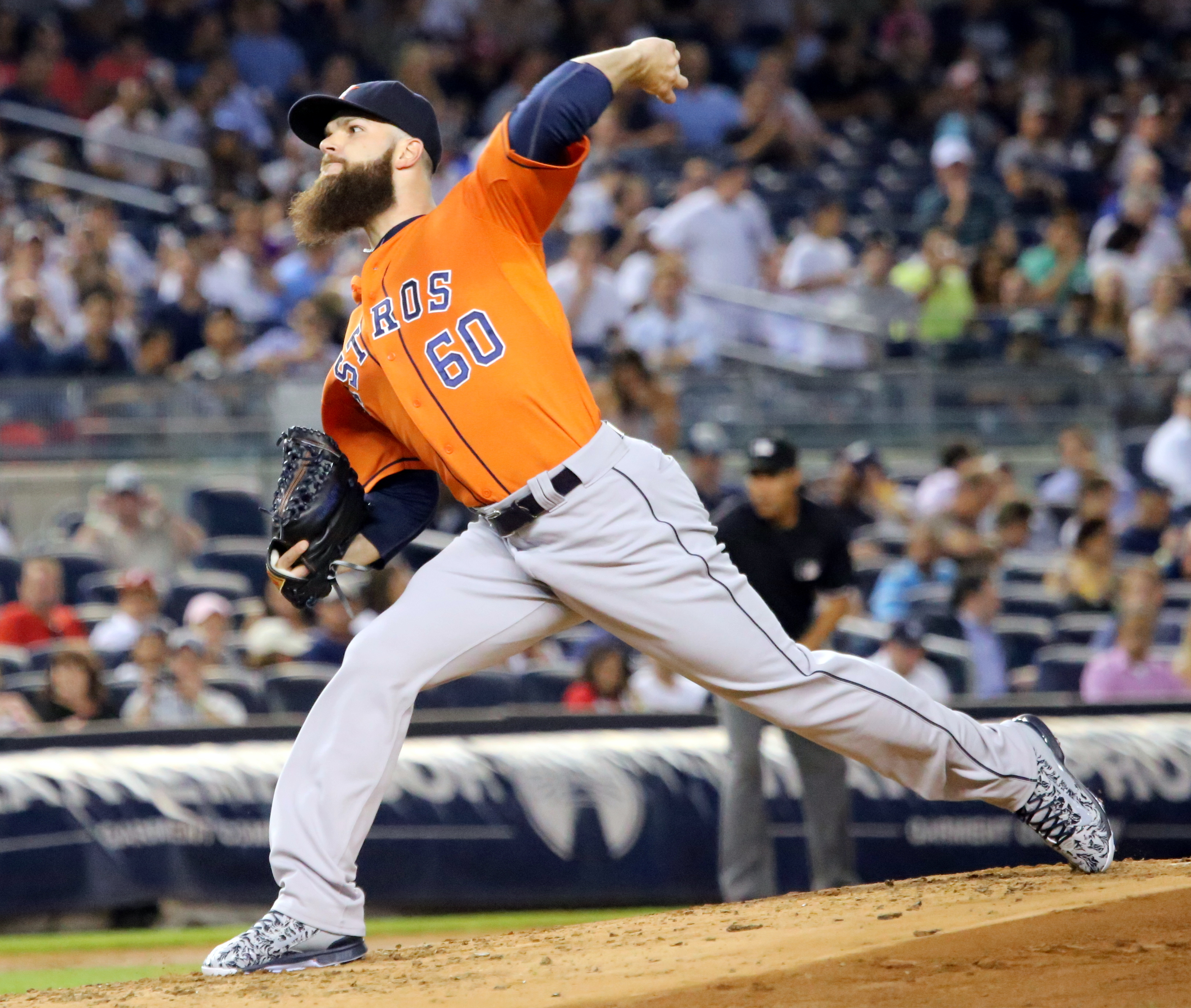
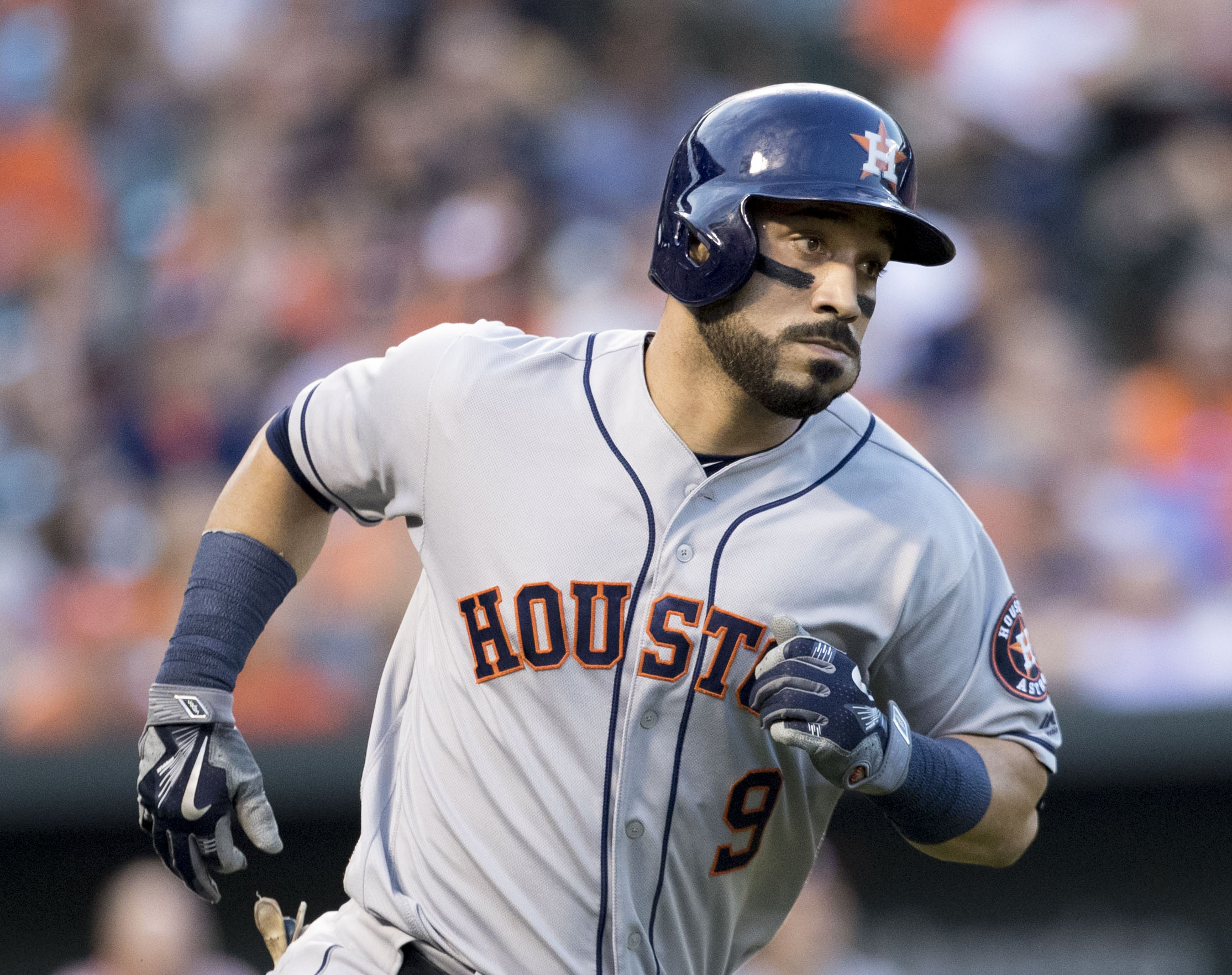
Dallas Keuchel (left) and Marwin González both publicly apologized.

Dallas Keuchel was the first member of the 2017 Astros to publicly apologize for the scandal. (As a pitcher in a league employing the designated hitter, he had not received any ill-gotten signals.) Speaking at a fan convention in February 2020 for his new team, the Chicago White Sox, Keuchel said, "It's just what the state of baseball was at that point and time. Was it against the rules? Yes it was, and I personally am sorry for what's come about, the whole situation." Marwin González was the first position player from the 2017 Astros to publicly apologize, speaking to the media at spring training as a member of the Minnesota Twins, saying, "I'm remorseful for everything that happened in 2017, everything that we did as a group and the players that were affected directly by us doing this." Musgrove said about the 2017 championship season, "I don't want to say it's tainted, but I think it is."

Former Astros hitting coach Dave Hudgens also apologized for his role in the scandal, admitting that he was aware of the illegal sign stealing but did not do anything to stop it. Hudgens also confirmed that Beltrán was one of the leaders in the scheme.

Hinch made his first public comments after his firing in February 2020 in a televised interview with Verducci on MLB Network. Hinch said that he had failed as a leader and that he lacked the confidence in 2017 to try to make the players stop. Verducci asked Hinch about the allegations the Astros had changed from the trash can banging to electronic buzzers worn underneath their uniforms that would signal what pitch was coming. Hinch's answer attracted scrutiny because he did not give a firm no, saying instead: "We got investigated for three months and the commissioner's office did as thorough an investigation as anyone could imagine was possible. I know he mentioned the emails and the texts and the messages. And I believe him." After the remark was questioned as evasive, Hinch issued a statement a few days later saying, "To be clear, I have never seen any such device used in baseball. I am not aware of any such device existing or being utilized with the Astros, the players, or any other team. ... In my interview with Tom, I acknowledged the commissioner's report as evidence due to the in-depth nature of the investigation, not as an intended non-answer or a way to elude the question."

On February 13, 2020, the Astros held a news conference at their spring training facility in West Palm Beach, Florida, to address the scandal. Bregman said: "I am really sorry about the choices that were made by my team, by the organization and by me. I have learned from this and I hope to regain the trust of baseball fans." Altuve said: "[I] especially feel remorse for the impact on our fans and the game of baseball." The players were sent back into the clubhouse for a media availability while Crane and new manager Dusty Baker took questions from the media. The press conference was panned by journalists who criticized Crane's answers to questions. It was also criticized by Anthony W. D'Angelo, the former chair of the Public Relations Society of America and director of the Newhouse School, as a "poor effort" in response to a scandal. Crane stated that he did not view the Astros' 2017 championship as tainted by the team's cheating.

After the press conference, the clubhouse was opened to members of the media and players were made available to speak. Correa said: "We were wrong for everything we did in 2017. It's not what we stand for. It's not what we want to portray as an organization, and we were definitely wrong about all that and we feel really sorry. We affected careers, we affected the game in some way, and looking back at it, it was just bad." However, Correa vehemently denied reports that Beltrán was the ringleader of the scheme and intimidated other players. Bregman said he was embarrassed and pledged to "work extremely hard" to regain trust. Altuve said: "I'm not going to say to you that it was good—it was wrong. We feel bad, we feel remorse, like I said, the impact on the fans, the impact on the game—we feel bad." Verlander, who was acquired via trade in the middle of the 2017 season, said: "I wish I had said more. Looking back, I can't go back, I can't reverse my decision. I wish I had said more, and I didn't, and for that I am sorry."

Tony Kemp, who played in 17 regular season games for the Astros in 2017 after a September call-up, said he was immediately asked if he wanted to participate in the sign stealing scheme but refused. He said, "Once I got there in September, the system was already in place, and I just tried to keep my head down and play hard and not really concern myself with it."

Dodgers player Cody Bellinger said that Altuve had stolen the AL Most Valuable Player Award from runner-up Aaron Judge in 2017. Correa responded to Bellinger's comments in an interview with Rosenthal, saying that Altuve did not want anything to do with the sign-stealing scheme: "The few times that the trash can was banged was without his consent, and he would go inside the clubhouse and inside the dugout to whoever was banging the trash can and he would get pissed. He would get mad. He would say, 'I don't want this. I can't hit like this. Don't you do that to me.' He played the game clean." Correa also said that the Astros did not steal signs in the 2017 World Series, and that they did not use the trash can banging in 2018.

Ken Giles, the Astros' closer during the 2017 season, asserted that he was unaware of the sign stealing. He was also the second player, after Fiers, to say that he would give back his World Series ring. Giles said: "Whatever they ask, I would oblige. Because what was going on at the time was not OK." Collin McHugh, another pitcher on the 2017 Astros, said that he knew about the illegal sign stealing scheme and expressed remorse for going along with it. McHugh said: "You've got to be willing to stick up for what you believe in and what you believe is right and what you believe is wrong. And I think a lot of the guys on that team, including myself, are looking back now and wishing we had been as brave in the moment as we thought we were beforehand. To put myself in the shoes of the guys who pitched against us in 2017 and to know that our hitters made that job that much harder that year - it's hard to swallow. And I feel for them and I understand the anger and I understand when people are mad and pissed off."

=== MLB reactions ===
While the investigation was ongoing, Molly Knight of The Athletic identified and attempted to contact nine pitchers who were demoted to the minors or designated for assignment immediately after a poor appearance against the Astros in 2017. Four pitchers agreed to be quoted anonymously; three put the blame for their fates on their own performance and a fourth saw the allegations as an explanation for why Astros players seemed to be more comfortable at the plate at home. The other five pitchers either could not be reached or declined to comment.

Players publicly commented about the scandal during the offseason. Anger towards the Astros from fellow MLB players grew, especially as the scandal wore on. ESPN's Buster Olney reported that some Astros players had reached out to other players to assure them that they did not cheat, but that some of those friendships were fractured and there was "lots of anger" towards Astros players after the release of the report. Baseball Hall of Fame member Hank Aaron said the punishments did not fit the crime, adding, "I think whoever did that should be out of baseball for the rest of their lives." Pitcher Mike Clevinger said the Astros should be "ashamed" and, "I don't think any of those [expletive] should be able to look us in the eye."

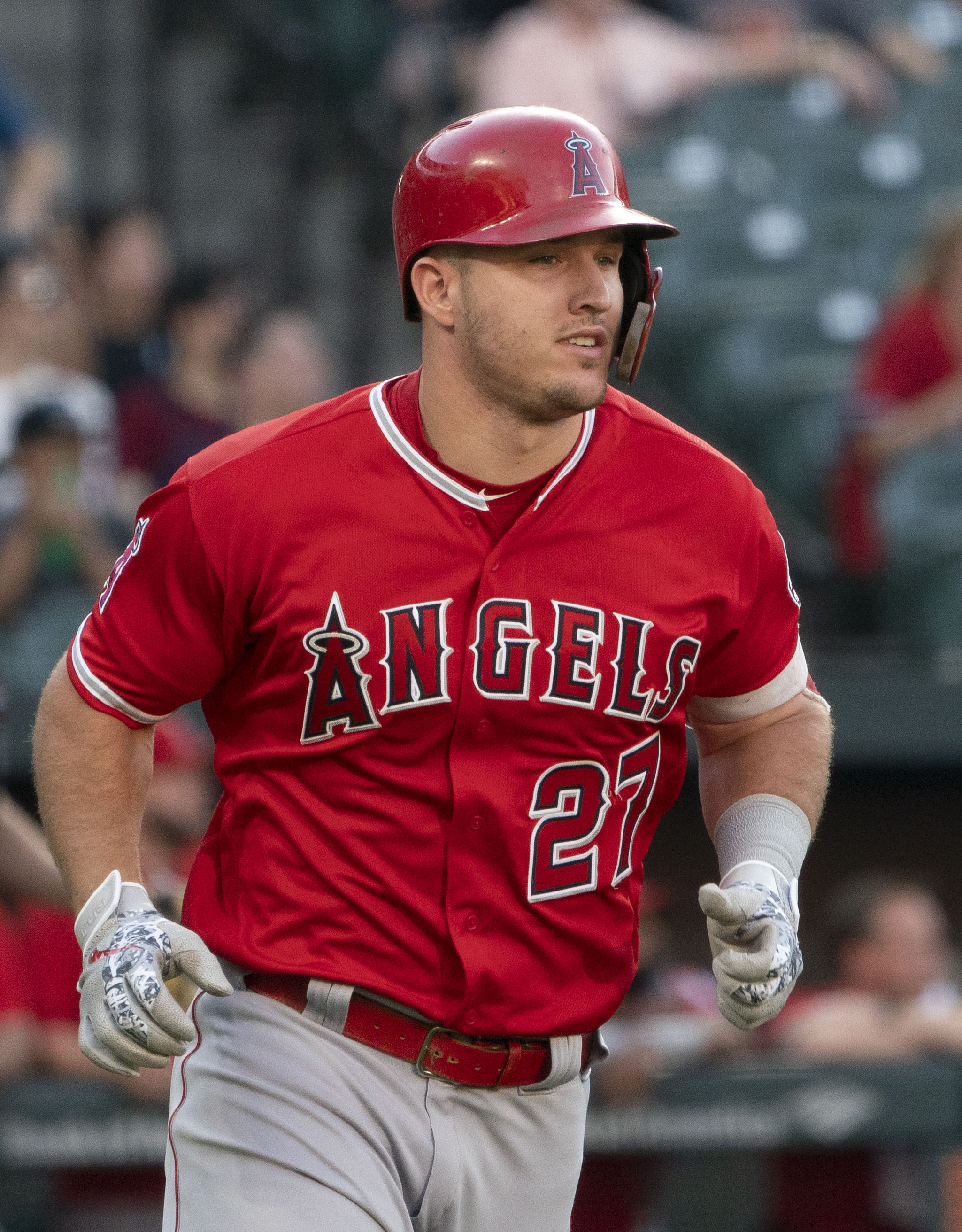
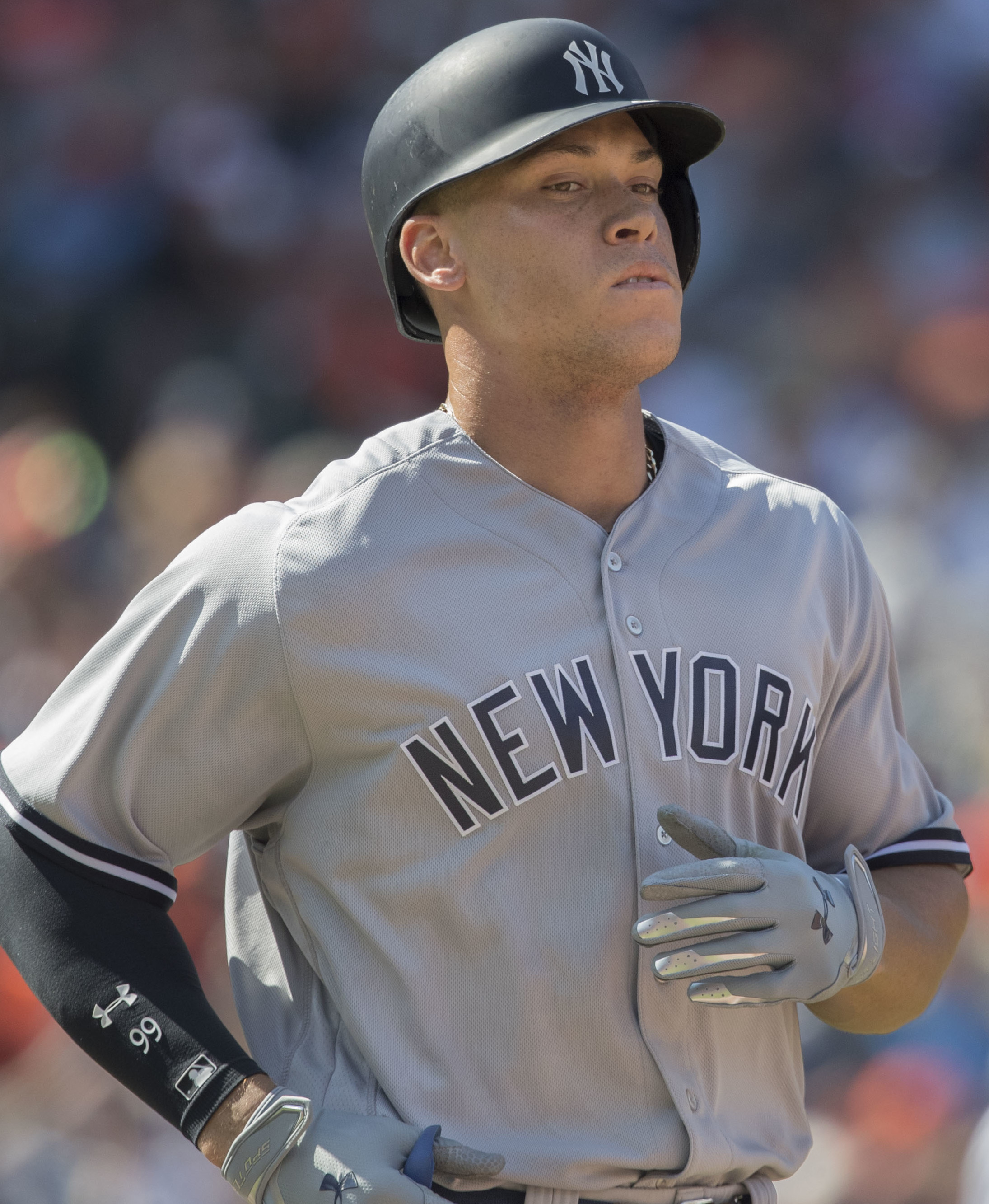
Mike Trout (left) and Aaron Judge were both critical of the Astros and said they had cheated.

Cincinnati Reds pitcher Trevor Bauer was critical of the Astros and gave an eight-minute long answer to a question about the scandal. "I'm not going to let them forget the fact that they are hypocrites, they are cheaters, they've stolen from a lot of other people and the game itself," he said. Bauer had publicly accused the Astros of cheating before the scandal broke. Mike Trout, a three-time AL Most Valuable Player, said: "It's sad for baseball. It's tough. They cheated. I don't agree with the punishments, the players not getting anything. It was a player-driven thing." Trout said that a few members of the Astros talked to him personally about the scandal, but he said that he "lost some respect for some guys". Yankees player Aaron Judge said that the Astros should be forced to vacate their title and that the players involved should have been punished. On their 2017 World Series championship, he said: "I just don't think it holds any value with me. You cheated and you didn't earn it."

On the other hand, retired Hall of Fame pitcher Pedro Martínez was critical of Fiers for exposing the scheme after he had left the Astros, saying, "Whatever happens in the clubhouse stays in the clubhouse and Fiers broke the rules." Jessica Mendoza, an advisor to the Mets and ESPN commentator, also criticized Fiers for going public with his allegations. After being criticized herself for going after Fiers, Mendoza backtracked and said that she wished Fiers had made his allegations privately with MLB.

Former MLB player Doug Glanville, in The Athletic, wrote that it was "inevitable" that an Astros pitcher like Fiers was going to break the scandal because the sign stealing scheme only benefited hitters. According to Glanville: "No pitcher, even on a team taking advantage of it, likes technological sign-stealing espionage of this kind, not deep down. Sure, you have teammates you are loyal to, but you are also in a professional order that unites you with other pitchers in the league."

Many executives and players at other MLB clubs were unhappy that no players were punished. According to Passan, several executives made their dissatisfaction known in a conference call at which Manfred spelled out the sanctions. One team president told Passan that he believed the scandal was handled in a manner "programmed to protect the future of the [Astros] franchise." The Dodgers were the only team to release a statement the week the report was released, only to say that they had been ordered by MLB not to comment on the punishments or "any wrongdoing during the 2017 World Series".

Nationals catcher Kurt Suzuki said he believed the Astros were still cheating in the 2019 World Series: "Oh, yeah, no question. We could hear it from their dugout. We heard their whistling. What are you going to do?" Nationals general manager Mike Rizzo said after the Astros won the AL pennant in 2019, "we got a lot of volunteer phone calls on how to beat them and how to play them." He also expressed frustration that most media attention at the start of 2020 spring training was focused on the Astros and not the reigning World Series champion Nationals.

Olney later said "front-office staffers around baseball cannot remember a circumstance of such widespread and loud player-to-player condemnation." Angry comments from players increased when spring training began in February. Many players criticized the Astros, especially after their press conference at the beginning of camp. Many of the condemnations came from members of the Dodgers, whom the Astros defeated in the 2017 World Series, and the Yankees, whom the Astros defeated in the ALCS in both 2017 and 2019.

Catcher Jonathan Lucroy said that he became aware of the Astros' illegal sign stealing in 2018 when new teammate Fiers told him about it. This led Lucroy to create more complicated sign-calling patterns against the Astros. According to Lucroy, "Everyone in baseball [knew], especially in that division that played against them. But we were all aware of the Astros doing those things and it was up to us to outsmart them, I guess you could say." Lucroy also said that the Oakland Athletics had told MLB about the Astros but that no investigation was started until Fiers publicly broke the scandal in November 2019. Athletics general manager David Forst also confirmed that Oakland complained to MLB before the investigation.

In an interview with ESPN's Karl Ravech which aired on February 16, Manfred defended his decision not to punish any Astros players. He cited longstanding precedent against stripping titles. Additionally, Manfred claimed that had he disciplined any players, the Players Association would have filed a grievance—one that Manfred believed MLB would have almost certainly lost due to Luhnow's failure to notify the Astros players about the 2017 memorandum. As Manfred put it, the union would have opposed any player suspensions "on the basis that we never properly informed them of the rules". He did say, however, that "in a perfect world", he would have disciplined players.

In June 2023, Manfred reflected on his decision to grant Astros players immunity and referred to it as "maybe not my best decision ever".

=== Public reactions ===
Public reaction was intense with fans taking to social media to voice their criticism. The Los Angeles City Council passed a resolution in January 2020 calling on MLB to strip the Astros of the 2017 World Series title and award it to the Dodgers. US Representative Bobby Rush from Illinois released a letter calling on the chairman of the US House Committee on Oversight and Reform to open a congressional investigation into the scandal along with MLB's response.

An Astros fan named Tony Adams published data that he collected from watching 58 Astros home games from the 2017 season and listening for banging noises. He found evidence of the trash can banging on 1,143 of 8,274 pitches thrown to Astros hitters, hearing the most instances of banging during the at-bats of Marwin González among everyday players (136 correct bangs out of 807 pitches for roughly 18.2% of the pitches he saw), and the fewest instances during Altuve's at-bats (19 out of 886 for 2.7%). Adams further discovered that the trash can banging ended on September 21, 2017, when Chicago White Sox pitcher Danny Farquhar called a mound visit after hearing a bang during an at-bat against Evan Gattis. These results were later published on a website by Adams with the domain signstealingscandal.com.

Pantone 294, who organize trips to away games for the Dodgers fans, purchased over 2,700 tickets to the Los Angeles Angels' home opener on April 3 against the Astros to jeer the team, since the Astros were not scheduled to play the Dodgers in 2020. Later during the 2022 World Series between the Astros and the Philadelphia Phillies, a local Philadelphia personal injury lawyer James Helm trolled the Astros with a billboard on I-76 in Philadelphia with the tagline "HAD A FUNNY SIGN BUT THE ASTROS STOLE IT".

In February 2020, a writer named Brendan Donley started a Twitter account called the "2020 Astros Shame Tour" to post about the Astros season. He tweeted videos of Astros players getting hit by pitches and getting heckled by fans. The account quickly gained a large following and has over 188,000 followers as of March 28, 2020. On the Astros' cheating, Donley said: "Just the same feeling I had when I was a kid during the steroid era. You feel deceived. You just feel put off. Just make it up to us—properly apologize or take the proper punishment. Neither of those two things happened."

==== Polls ====
ESPN conducted a survey of 1,010 adults, including 810 MLB fans, asking about the scandal on January 16 and 17, 2020. Fifty-eight percent of adults said Astros players should have been penalized, and 72 percent of adults said they would support additional steps by MLB to punish players involved in sign stealing. Sixty-one percent of MLB fans said they were closely following the scandal, and 86 percent of MLB fans said the situation was "serious" (including 57 percent who said it was "very serious"). Forty-nine percent of adults said the steroid scandal was more serious than the sign stealing scandal, but 44 percent said the sign stealing scandal was worse than Pete Rose gambling on his own team. Seventy-four percent of adults and 76 percent of MLB fans said they believed most teams were using technology to steal signs, but only the Astros and Red Sox were caught. Fifty-four percent of adults said their views of MLB were unchanged by the scandal and 60 percent of adults said the scandals made no difference in their likelihood to watch MLB games.

Seton Hall University released a poll of 693 adults about the scandal. Fifty-four percent of respondents said Manfred should have punished the players, with seventeen percent saying he should not have. Forty-nine percent said Manfred's investigation was a "cover up", compared to 14 percent who said it was a serious effort to punish wrongdoing. Seventy percent of respondents said MLB's handling of the scandal had no effect on their inclination to follow baseball, while seventeen percent said it made them less inclined and seven percent said it made them more inclined.

=== Lawsuits ===
Two users of the sports betting website DraftKings, in which MLB is an investor, filed separate lawsuits against MLB, alleging that the league had encouraged fans to bet on games through sponsorship deals with DraftKings while failing to "ensure the honesty and integrity of games that served as the basis of [DraftKings] competitions". The lawsuit was not successful with the judge stating that "general awareness" of the MLB's corruption foreclosed their ability to sue for losses.

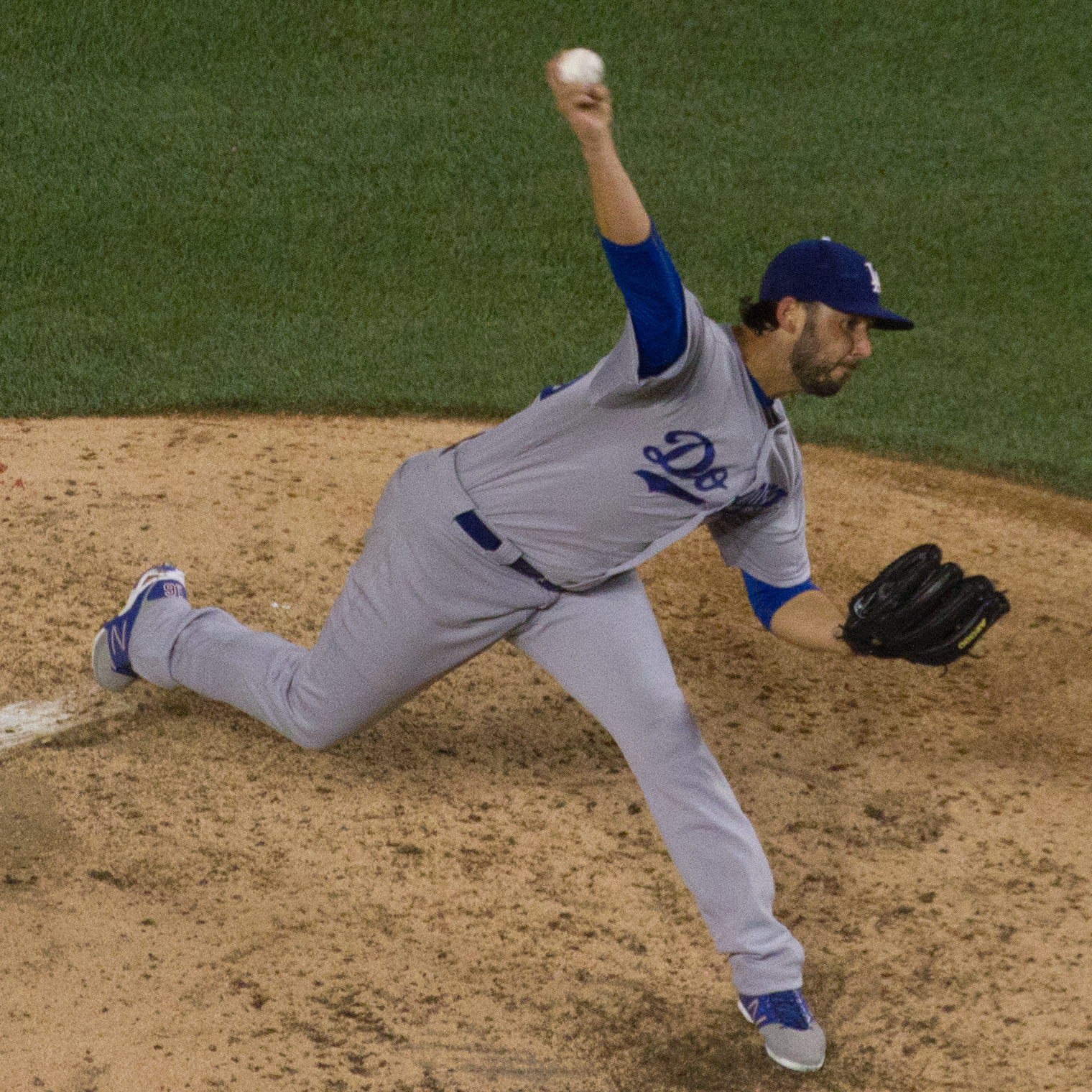
Mike Bolsinger in 2015

In February 2020, former MLB pitcher Mike Bolsinger filed a lawsuit against the Astros in Los Angeles Superior Court, alleging that the Astros used the banging scheme against him while he was a pitcher for the Toronto Blue Jays in 2017. Bolsinger gave up four runs and got only one out against the Astros on August 4, 2017, and was demoted to the minor leagues after the game and never made it back to the majors. Bolsinger alleges that the Astros changed the course of his career by engaging in unfair business practices, negligence and intentional interference with contractual and economic relations. Bolsinger's suit seeks unspecified damages for him, and he also wants the Astros to forfeit $31 million in bonuses from their 2017 World Series win to charities in Los Angeles and to a fund for retired players seeking financial assistance. In an op-ed for The Washington Post, Bolsinger wrote: "The Astros had robbed me of the opportunity to determine my own future on the mound. If I failed at my craft because I wasn't good enough, that would be on me. I could live with that. But thinking about the cheating and the toll it ultimately took on my family—that was something I couldn't tolerate." He filed the lawsuit in California despite there being no connection between Bolsinger, the Astros, or California. Judge David Cowan of the Los Angeles Superior Court dismissed the lawsuit. A refiling in Texas led to a subsequent nonfiling by August 2021, which meant the case was dismissed without prejudice.

Three lawsuits against the Astros were filed on behalf of current and former season ticket holders in Harris County, Texas, courts in February 2020. Each case alleges the season ticket holders were defrauded by the sign stealing scandal because the play on the field was not what they believed it to be, and the team had raised season ticket prices because of success obtained through sign stealing. A minor league affiliate of the Astros, the Corpus Christi Hooks, revoked the season tickets of Bob Hilliard, an attorney in one of the lawsuits against the Astros a week after it was filed.

On November 8, 2020, ex-Astros general manager Jeff Luhnow sued the Astros, alleging that Astros owner Jim Crane and Major League Baseball Commissioner Rob Manfred negotiated penalties for the sign-stealing scandal that enabled the team to paint Luhnow as the scapegoat for the organization and fire its general manager "in order to save more than $22 million in guaranteed salary".

== Subsequent revelations ==
On February 7, 2020, Jared Diamond of The Wall Street Journal published a report of previously undisclosed details uncovered by the MLB investigation, drawn from a letter sent by Manfred to Luhnow on January 2, 2020, that was obtained by the Journal and interviews with sources. According to the article, the sign stealing scandal originated in September 2016 when an intern named Derek Vigoa, who later became the Astros senior manager for team operations, gave Luhnow a PowerPoint presentation on what he called "Codebreaker", a Microsoft Excel-based program used by front office staff to log and decode opposing catchers signs and then communicate them to baserunners who would relay them to hitters. The report said Codebreaker was enhanced in June 2017 when the trash can scheme was developed. The report also said that Codebreaker was used both at home and on the road and Astros personnel continued to use it into the 2018 season. The sign-stealing operations were referred to as "dark arts" within the Astros front office.

Diamond's report quoted emails from Luhnow and Astros employees who said Luhnow was not only aware of but also enthusiastic about the sign stealing operations, even though he denied knowledge of them to MLB and in public statements. In a subsequent Journal article, Diamond quoted an email sent by an Astros employee named Tom Koch-Weser to his colleagues which read, "'I don't want to electronically correspond too much about 'the system' but Cora/Cintrón/Beltrán have been driving a culture initiated by Bregman/Vigoa last year and I think it's working,' Koch-Weser wrote. 'I have no proof that it has worked, but we get real good dope on pitchers tipping and being lazy. That information, if it's not already, will eventually yield major results in our favor once players get used to the implementation.'" The article also quotes Manfred's January 2 letter to Luhnow as saying, "'Most or all Astros players were active participants in the Banging Scheme by the conclusion of the 2017 World Series. ... The Banging Scheme was so prevalent,' Manfred wrote, 'that witnesses regularly describe that everyone in and around the Astros dugout was presumptively aware of it.'" In a February press conference, Manfred sarcastically "congratulated" Diamond, saying, "You know, congratulations. You got a private letter that, you know, I sent to a club official. Nice reporting on your part."

On February 11, 2020, Rosenthal and Drellich published an article in The Athletic, drawing from interviews of six unnamed members of the 2017 Astros, which portrayed Beltrán as the leader of the clubhouse and the ringleader of the electronic sign stealing system. According to the article, "small groups of Astros discussed their misgivings" with the system, and catcher Brian McCann at one point asked Beltrán to stop. One player said, "He disregarded it and steamrolled everybody. Where do you go if you're a young, impressionable player with the Astros and this guy says, 'We're doing this'? What do you do?"

== Impact and aftermath ==
The scandal led to scrutiny of the culture of the Astros organization under Crane and Luhnow, which according to Jeremy Venook of The Atlantic had "developed a reputation for a cutthroat, win-at-all-costs mentality that sacrificed the human element of the game for marginal gains on the playing field". It also prompted questions about how technology had taken over the game, especially with the introduction of instant replay review in 2014 and all 30 teams installing video rooms to decide whether to challenge calls in real time. Some questioned the leadership of Manfred as Commissioner and his decision not to punish players or sanction Crane. Manfred was heavily criticized by players after a February press conference in which he defended his decision not to discipline Astros players and called the Commissioner's Trophy merely a "piece of metal" that did not need to be taken away.

Following the scandal, players and teams were restricted from accessing video replay rooms during the 2020 season, though this was later lifted in the 2021 season on the condition that the replay footage would not show catcher signals to prevent sign-stealing. New Astros manager Dusty Baker, hired to replace Hinch, asked MLB to try to prevent opposing pitchers from throwing beanballs at Astros hitters after some pitchers made explicit or veiled threats; Manfred said a memo would be issued to teams about it. In the first five games of 2020 spring training, seven Astros were hit by pitches from opposing pitchers. Pete Rose, the all-time MLB leader in hits who was banned for life from baseball for gambling on games as a player-manager, applied for reinstatement in the wake of the scandal, arguing that his permanent ban was disproportionately severe compared to the lack of discipline for Astros players.

The COVID-19 pandemic led to a shortened 2020 MLB season with no fans in the stands, which lessened the impact of the scandal on the Astros and MLB. However, tempers boiled over in a July 2020 series when Dodgers pitcher Joe Kelly and Astros hitter Carlos Correa jawed at each other, leading to a benches-clearing incident. The Astros finished the abbreviated 2020 regular season with a 29–31 record, second in the AL West, but in the expanded playoff format, they made it into the playoffs and advanced to Game 7 of the ALCS, where they lost to the Tampa Bay Rays.

After his suspension ended after the 2020 World Series, A. J. Hinch was hired as the team manager for the Detroit Tigers. Alex Cora, who was also suspended through the 2020 season, came back as the manager of the Boston Red Sox for the 2021 season.

The 2021 season was the first season in which teams allowed fans in stadiums since the beginning of the pandemic. On Opening Day 2021, fans of the Oakland Athletics relentlessly booed and mocked the players throughout the game with signs referencing the scandal and trash cans. In a game in Anaheim against the Los Angeles Angels in early April, the fans in attendance, many of which were Dodger fans, yelled and threw both an inflatable and real trash can onto the right field warning track. Following the game, Astros manager Dusty Baker criticized the fans' behavior, stating the team had already "paid" for its past mistakes. During a game against the New York Yankees in May, many Yankees fans directed hostile insults at Astros players, with the most hostile insults going towards Jose Altuve whenever he was on the field. On May 25, 2021, the first full capacity game at Minute Maid Park was held with the Dodgers as the visiting team. Members of the Pantone 294 Dodgers fan group began to protest outside of the stadium and heckled both players and fans during the game. On August 3, 2021, the Dodgers and Astros played the first game of a two-game series at Dodger Stadium, their first meeting in front of Dodgers fans since the story broke in 2019. Stadium and league personnel increased security in anticipation of crowd anger towards the Astros. The game had the largest attendance of any MLB game in 2021. Some fights broke out in the stands. The Astros won the first game of the series. The Dodgers won the second game, which had a similar attendance and fan hostility towards the Astros, splitting the series.

The exposure and removal of the electronic cheating did not stop the Astros' accomplished play. They reached the American League Championship Series in four consecutive seasons (2020–2023), winning in 2021 and 2022. They won the 2022 World Series in six games over the Philadelphia Phillies.

Before the start of the 2022 season, MLB approved the use of PitchCom, a wireless communication system used in baseball that lets a player request pitches without using visible signals, with the intentions of deterring sign stealing and quickening the pace of play.

During the 2022 World Series, Houston businessman Jim McIngvale attended Game 3, where Phillies fans harassed McIngvale in the concourse and accused second baseman Jose Altuve of taking part of the cheating. McIngvale responded by repeatedly yelling "fuck you" at the fans. After the incident, McIngvale referred to Philadelphia sports fans as the "worst fans ever."

In a June 2023 interview with Time, Manfred said that he regretted giving Astros players immunity from punishment in the wake of the scandal and said that it was "maybe not [his] best decision ever". The scandal was cited as a detriment for Carlos Beltran to reach the National Baseball Hall of Fame and Museum when he became eligible in 2023. In 2026, he was finally inducted on his fourth year on the ballot, becoming the first member of the 2017 Astro team to be inducted.

== Efficacy ==
A study presented in a long article in The Ringer concluded that there was no evidence that being informed of the nature of the pitch just before it is thrown actually helps the hitter. The article addressed prior situations of teams illegally stealing signs, such as the 1951 New York Giants, but did its deepest dive on the 2017 and 2018 Houston Astros. It found that the Astros' alleged ringleader Carlos Beltran seemed not to benefit at all, and while it may have helped one of his teammates, Marwin Gonzalez, the overall statistics show that it did not help the team's hitters. A study in Baseball Prospectus reached a near-identical conclusion, showing that the Astros gained "no runs at all" from the scheme. A study done by two researchers at Duke University, while less comprehensive, concluded as well that the Astros did not benefit. The Duke study focused on results at home versus those on the road.

Conversely, a detailed statistical study conducted by Ryan Elmore and Gregory J. Matthews, professors of statistics at the University of Denver and Loyola University Chicago, respectively, analyzed the use of bangs to communicate stolen signs, and concluded that the sign stealing clearly aided hitters for three reasons. First, the odds of swinging at a pitch were about 27.5% lower when a bang was present prior to the pitch. Second, given a swing, the odds of making contact with a breaking ball were about 80% higher when a bang was present prior to the pitch. Third, given a swing and contact, exit velocity was increased by an average of 2.386 miles per hour when a bang was present.

== In popular culture ==
- The Family Guy episode "Pawtucket Pat" showed the Griffin family watching a fake 30 for 30 documentary on the Astros. A man then appears on the screen in front of Hall of Fame plaques and a Dodgers jersey and says, "We knew the Astros were stealing signals. Someone was back there banging on a trash can. We just couldn't figure out who." A camera pans over a fake photo of the Astros with a narrator explaining that nobody would reveal the mastermind of the trash can-banging scheme, before Sesame Street's Oscar the Grouch appears in the picture.
- On a January 2021 episode of Wheel of Fortune, host Pat Sajak quipped about the sign-stealing Astros. The answer for the "What Are You Doing?" category turned out to be "Banging On Trash Cans", which led to an Astros joke by Sajak, who used to host "The Pat Sajak Baseball Hour" on MLB.com and was once an investor in the independent Golden Baseball League. A notable method of the Astros sign stealing scheme was the banging of a trash can to signal an off-speed pitch was coming.
- Author Ben Reiter produced an audio docuseries on the Astros' 2017 sign-stealing scandal, profiling the people and events that led to a culture that was willing to pursue an unethical advantage over the opposition in order to win. There was also some personal stake for Reiter, who sought to redeem himself for missing the Astros' cheating scheme while documenting how they built a championship organization. Reiter is best known for the 2014 Sports Illustrated feature that looked at how the Astros were changing the game, a cover story that predicted Houston would win the World Series by 2017, with the cover featuring eventual World Series MVP George Springer. Reiter also wrote Astroball, a book that expanded upon what he initially reported, chronicling the methodology and key figures of the Astros which changed the formula for baseball success.
- In February 2023, former Astros beat writer Evan Drellich released Winning Fixes Everything: How Baseball's Brightest Minds Created Sports' Biggest Mess, a book about the sign stealing scandal, its impact on MLB, and the Astros culture at the time.
- A documentary episode of Frontline in Season 42 covers the scandal and its aftermath, titled "The Astros Edge: Triumph and Scandal in Major League Baseball". It was released on October 3, 2023.

== See also ==
- Major League Baseball scandals
- Spygate (NFL), a similar controversy in the National Football League
