= Tong Jilu =

- 佟吉禄

Chairman of China Tower Corporation Limited
- In office March 2018 – September 2021
- Preceded by: Liu Aili
- Succeeded by: Zhang Zhiyong

General Manager of China Tower Corporation
- In office August 2014 – March 2018
- Preceded by: New title
- Succeeded by: Chen Li

Personal details
- Born: April 1958 (age 68) Shenyang, Liaoning, China
- Party: Chinese Communist Party
- Education: Beijing University of Posts and Telecommunications; Hong Kong Polytechnic University

Chinese name
- Simplified Chinese: 佟吉禄
- Traditional Chinese: 佟吉祿
Transcriptions
Standard Mandarin
- Hanyu Pinyin: Tóng Jílù

Tong Jilu (Chinese: 佟吉禄; born April 1958) is a retired Chinese business executive who served as chairman and party secretary of China Tower Corporation Limited. As of September 2025 he was under investigation by China's top anti-graft watchdog. He was a representative at the 19th National Congress of the Chinese Communist Party.

== Early life and education ==
Tong was born in Shenyang, Liaoning, in April 1958. In 1987, he graduated from Beijing University of Posts and Telecommunications with a degree in economic management. He also held a master of business administration (MBA) and earned a doctorate in management from Hong Kong Polytechnic University in 2009.

== Career ==
Tong entered politics in August 1976. In his early career, he worked in Liaoning Province Posts and Telecommunications Administration (now Liaoning Provincial Postal Bureau), where he was eventually promoted to deputy director. In July 2000 he joined the China United Telecommunications Corporation as chief accountant and vice president.

In August 2014, Tong joined the newly established China Tower Corporation Limited as its general manager. He was promoted to chairman of the board and party secretary in March 2018. He played a significant role in the company's development from its establishment to its listing on the Hong Kong Stock Exchange. He resigned in September 2021 due to age reasons.

== Downfall ==
On 21 September 2025, Tong was put under investigation for alleged "serious violations of discipline and laws" by the Central Commission for Discipline Inspection (CCDI), the party's internal disciplinary body, and the National Supervisory Commission, the highest anti-corruption agency of China. His wife and son were also sacked for graft.

Business positions
New title	General Manager of China Tower Corporation; 2014–2018	Succeeded by Chen Li (陈力)
Preceded by Liu Aili (刘爱力)	Chairman of China Tower Corporation; 2018–2021	Succeeded by Zhang Zhiyong (张志勇)
