= China Tower =

Chinese state-owned telecommunications company

China Tower Corporation Limited
- Company type: Public
- Traded as: SEHK: 788 (H share only); China Mainland All
- Industry: Telecommunications
- Predecessor: Telecom tower businesses of China Mobile, China Unicom and China Telecom
- Founded: 2014; 12 years ago
- Headquarters: Beijing, China
- Area served: China
- Key people: Tong Ji-lu (chairman)
- Services: Telecommunication towers

Chinese name
- Simplified Chinese: 中国铁塔股份有限公司
- Traditional Chinese: 中國鐵塔股份有限公司
Transcriptions
Standard Mandarin
- Hanyu Pinyin: Zhōngguó tiětǎ gǔfèn yǒuxiàn gōngsī

short name
- Simplified Chinese: 中国铁塔
- Traditional Chinese: 中國鐵塔
Transcriptions
Standard Mandarin
- Hanyu Pinyin: Zhōngguó tiětǎ

alternative short name
- Simplified Chinese: 中铁塔
- Traditional Chinese: 中鐵塔
Transcriptions
- Website: china-tower.com

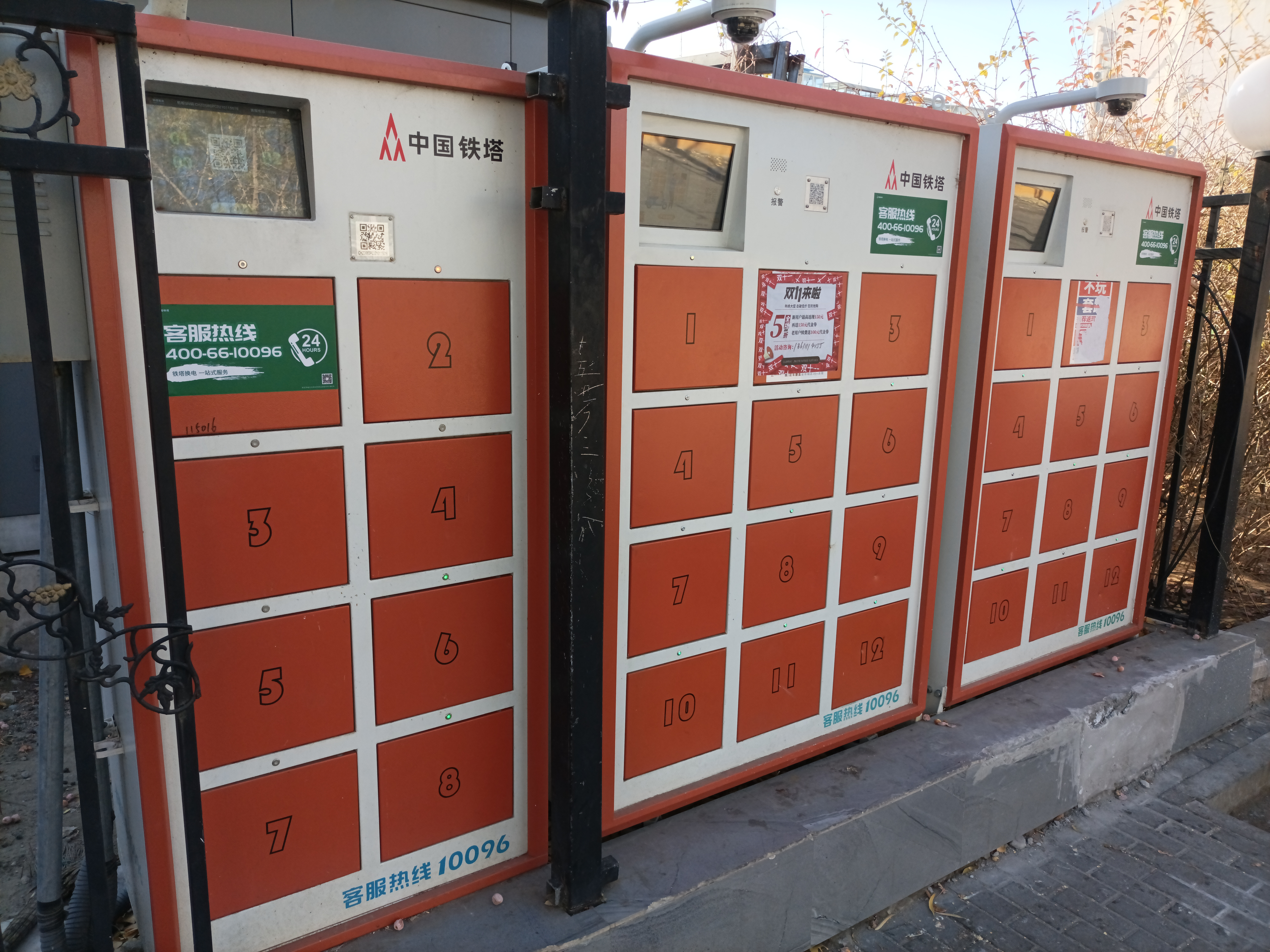
China Tower battery swap station in Beijing

China Tower Corporation Limited (SEHK: 788), doing business as China Tower, is a state-owned telecommunication company in providing telecommunication tower construction, tower maintenance, ancillary facilities management, and other services through mainland China.

China Tower was established in July 2014 by merging the telecom tower businesses among China's three telecom giants – China Mobile, China Unicom and China Telecom, which are customers and shareholders of China Tower.

It was listed on Hong Kong Stock Exchange on 8 August 2018 at a price of HK$1.26 per share which raised US$6.9 billion.

== List of leaders ==
=== General Managers ===
| Name (English) | Name (Chinese) | Tenure begins | Tenure ends | Ref. |
|---|---|---|---|---|
| Tong Jilu | 佟吉禄 | August 2014 | March 2018 | |
| Chen Li | 陈力 | March 2018 | | |

=== Chairmen ===
| Name (English) | Name (Chinese) | Tenure begins | Tenure ends | Ref. |
|---|---|---|---|---|
| Liu Aili | 刘爱力 | | | |
| Tong Jilu | 佟吉禄 | March 2018 | September 2021 | |
| Zhang Zhiyong | 张志勇 | September 2021 | | |
