= Anthony W. D'Angelo =

Anthony W. D’Angelo is an American public relations executive and educator who served as the 2018 national chair of the Public Relations Society of America and is chair of the department of public relations at the S. I. Newhouse School of Public Communications. He is a member of the PRSA College of Fellows.

== Education ==
D’Angelo was born and raised in upstate New York. He attended Newark Valley High School in Tioga County, New York. D’Angelo attended Syracuse University’s S.I. Newhouse School of Public Communications, where he pursued a dual major in English and public relations graduating in 1982.

He later returned to Syracuse for graduate studies, completed a Master of Science in Communications Management at Newhouse in 1997.

== Career ==
D’Angelo began his public relations career in the early 1980s, working in marketing and communications roles in the private sector. One of his first roles was with Sage Marketing Communications, an agency where he honed his skills in client service and strategic messaging. In 1993, he joined Carrier Corporation, a subsidiary of United Technologies, in Syracuse. Over the next 15 years at Carrier (1993–2008), D’Angelo held communications leadership positions of increasing responsibility eventually becoming Director of Global Marketing Communications for Carrier’s Transicold division.

In 2015, D’Angelo pivoted to academia and joined the faculty of the S.I. Newhouse School of Public Communications at Syracuse University as a Professor of Practice in public relations. In 2016, he was appointed director of the Executive Education master’s program in Communications Management. In 2023, D’Angelo was named interim chair of the Newhouse School’s Public Relations Department, stepping into the top academic leadership role for the PR program. In 2024, his appointment became permanent. He has also contributed to two public relations textbooks.

In 2018, he was elected national chair of the Public Relations Society of America. He was previously elected to the PRSA College of Fellows in 2008 and chair of the college in 2014.

Following the Houston Astros sign stealing scandal, D'Angelo criticized its owners' apology describing it as a "poor effort" from a public relations perspective.
