= China Telecom =

State-owned long-distance data transmission firm

China Telecom Corporation Limited
- Native name: 中国电信股份有限公司
- Type: Public
Traded as
SSE: 601728	(A share)
SEHK: 728	(H share)
CSI A100
- ISIN: CNE1000002V2
- Industry: Telecommunications
- Founded: 10 September 2002; 24 years ago
- Founder: China Telecommunications Corporation
- Headquarters: Beijing, China; Shanghai, China
- Area served: China, Europe and the Americas
Key people
Yang Jie	(Chairman & CEO)
- Services: Fixed-line telephony; mobile telephony; Internet access; digital television
- Revenue: ▲CN¥352.285 billion (2016)
- Operating income: ▲CN¥27.201 billion (2016)
- Net income: ▼CN¥18.004 billion (2016)
- Total assets: ▲CN¥652.368 billion (2016)
- Total equity: ▲CN¥315.324 billion (2016)
- Owner: China Telecommunications Corporation (70.89%)
- Number of employees: 287,076 (2016)
- Parent: China Telecommunications Corporation
- ASNs: 4134 (ChinaNet); 4809 (CN2)
- Traffic Levels: 100+ Tbps
- Website: ChinaTelecom-H.com; ChinaTelecomGlobal.com; ChinaTelecom.com.cn

China Telecom Corp., Ltd.
- Simplified Chinese: 中国电信股份有限公司
- Traditional Chinese: 中國電信股份有限公司
Transcriptions
Standard Mandarin
- Hanyu Pinyin: Zhōngguó Diànxìn Gǔfèn Yǒuxiàn Gōngsī

China Telecom
- Simplified Chinese: 中国电信
- Traditional Chinese: 中國電信
Transcriptions
Standard Mandarin
- Hanyu Pinyin: Zhōngguó Diànxìn

China Telecom Corporation Limited, doing business as China Telecom (CT), is a Chinese major telecommunications company. It is the principal landline service provider of China and the second-largest mobile telecommunication provider in China.

The company's H shares have been publicly traded on the Hong Kong Stock Exchange since 15 November 2002. It is a constituent of the Hang Seng China Enterprises Index, the index for the H shares of state-controlled listed companies. The company was also listed on the New York Stock Exchange until January 2021. China Telecom is the second-largest wireless carrier in China, with 362.49 million subscribers as of June 2021.

== History ==
China Telecom Corporation Limited was incorporated on 10 September 2002 as a limited company in order to float some of the assets of the group on the stock exchange, specifically the wireline telecommunications businesses in Shanghai, Guangdong, Jiangsu, and Zhejiang, as well as other assets from the parent company.

In 2003, China Telecom acquired businesses in Anhui, Fujian, Jiangxi, Guangxi, Chongqing, Sichuan, as well as other assets for CN¥46 billion. In 2004, it acquired businesses in Hubei, Hunan, Hainan, Guizhou, Yunnan, Shaanxi, Gansu, Qinghai, Ningxia and Xinjiang and other assets for CN¥27.8 billion.

China Telecom was among six state-owned companies that built the communications infrastructure and assisted in financing the Ministry of Industry and Information Technology's Connecting Every Village Project, which began in 2004. The project aimed to promote universal telecommunications and internet access in rural China. The program successfully extended internet infrastructure throughout rural China and promoted development of the internet.

In 2007, China Telecom acquired three companies: China Telecom System Integration, China Telecom Global and China Telecom (Americas) for CN¥1.408 billion. In 2008 the business in Beijing (China Telecom Group Beijing) was acquired for CN¥5.557 billion. In 2011, e-commerce business and video media business were acquired by China Telecom's subsidiaries E-surfing Pay and E-surfing Media. However, E-surfing Media was sold back to the parent company in 2013. In 2012, a digital trunking business was acquired from sister company Besttone Holding (a company listed on the Shanghai Stock Exchange) for CN¥48 million. In 2013, China Telecom (Europe) was acquired from the parent company for CN¥278 million.

In 2015, China Telecom formed a joint venture China Tower with fellow state-owned telecommunication companies China Mobile and China Unicom. China Tower, which was the largest telecommunications tower group by revenue, became a separate listed company in 2018. China Telecom, China Mobile and China Unicom were remained the largest clients of China Tower as of 2018.

In August 2015, Chang Xiaobing, former chairman of China Unicom, became the chairman of China Telecom as well chairman of China Telecommunications Corporation. While Wang Xiaochu, who previously served in these two positions, was appointed to the same positions in China Unicom. However, Chang was investigated for corruption in December 2015 and resigned. He was sentenced to six years imprisonment in 2017.

In 2016, China Telecom was responsible for illegally intercepting communications between the governments of Canada and Korea.

=== Expansion outside mainland China ===
China Telecom (Europe) said on 23 October 2008 it would expand its Asian and European services, aiming to increase its market share in Europe. China Telecom (Europe) became part of China Telecom Corp., Ltd. in 2013.

In 2008, China Telecom acquired China Unicom (Macau). The subsidiary was renamed to China Telecom (Macau) In 2015, China Telecom (Macau) acquired a 4G LTE license from the Macau S.A.R. authority. The 4G service started in the same year.

In May 2011, China Telecom formed a strategic partnership with the German software group SAP to offer a cloud-based version of SAP's business software to small and medium companies in China.

In October 2015, China Telecom worked with SAP to create SAP Anywhere, although it was sunset by 2018 so SAP could focus on other more established services.

China Telecom, in partnership with Vodafone, was one of the bidders for a license in the newly opened mobile telecommunications market in Myanmar.

== Equity interests ==
As of 31 December 2016

- Besttone Holding (6.13%)

== Shareholders ==
As of 31 December 2016

Rank	Name	Percentage	Footnotes
1	China Telecommunications Corporation	70.89%	Central Government-owned SOE, owner of A share
2	Guangdong Rising Assets Management	6.94%	Guangdong Government-owned SOE, owner of A share
3	JPMorgan Chase	2.19%	Long position figure only, owner of H share
4	BlackRock	1.02%	Long position figure only, owner of H share
5	The Bank of New York Mellon	0.93%	Long position figure only, owner of H share
6	Templeton Global Advisors	0.87%	Long position figure only, owner of H share
7	GIC Private Limited	0.86%	Long position figure only, owner of H share

== Overseas subsidiaries ==
As of 19 November 2018

- China Telecom (Americas) Corporation
- China Telecom (Europe) Limited
- China Telecom (Macau)

=== U.S. government and China Telecom (Americas) Corporation ===
In January 2021, China Telecom was delisted from the NYSE in response to United States Executive Order 13959, signed by President Donald Trump. The same year, the Federal Communications Commission (FCC) revoked China Telecom (Americas) Corporation's operating license in the United States, citing national security reasons. However, China Telecom (Americas) Corp planned to keep offering other services on United States soil. In March 2022, the FCC designated China Telecom (Americas) Corp a national security threat. In April 2024, the FCC ordered U.S. units of China Telecom to discontinue operations in the country. The FCC previously alleged that China Telecom Americas used Border Gateway Protocol vulnerabilities to misroute U.S. internet traffic on at least six occasions. In December 2024, the United States Department of Commerce moved to crack down on China Telecom Americas' cloud and internet routing business in the United States. In March 2025, the United States House Select Committee on Strategic Competition between the United States and the Chinese Communist Party initiated an inquiry into China Telecom Americas and issued subpoenas for company records in April 2025.

== See also ==
- List of largest companies by revenue
- List of telecommunications companies
- List of telecommunications regulatory bodies
