= Chang Xiaobing =

Chinese business executive

Chang Xiaobing 常小兵
- Born: March 1957 (age 69); She County, Hebei, China
- Education: Nanjing University of Posts and Telecommunications; Tsinghua University; Hong Kong Polytechnic University
- Occupations: Chairman of China Unicom (2004 – August 2015); Chairman of China Telecom (August–December 2015)
- Years active: 1982–2015
- Political party: Chinese Communist Party (1976–2016, expelled)

Chang Xiaobing (Chinese: 常小兵; pinyin: Cháng Xiǎobīng; born March 1957) is a Chinese former business executive. He served as the chairman of China Unicom from 2004 to 2015, and the chairman of China Telecom in 2015. On December 27, 2015, Chang was placed under investigation by the Communist Party's anti-corruption agency. He is the first head of telecommunications in China implicated since the beginning of Xi Jinping's anti-corruption drive after he took power in late 2012.

== Career ==
Chang was born in She County, Hebei in March 1957. He was joined Chinese Communist Party in 1976 and graduated from Nanjing University of Posts and Telecommunications in 1982.

He became the engineer of the Post and Telecommunication Office of Lu'an, the vice-director of the Telecom Office of Nanjing since 1982. In June 1996, he became the vice-director of the China Post and Telecommunication Administration. In February 2000, Chang became the director of the Telecommunications Authority of the Ministry of Information Industry. In 2004, Chang became the chairman of China Unicom until August 2015. He became the chairman of China Telecom in August 2015.

Chang was a member of the 16th Central Commission for Discipline Inspection, the 11th Chinese People's Political Consultative Conference, and the 12th National People's Congress.

== Downfall ==
On December 27, Chang was placed under investigation by the Central Commission for Discipline Inspection, the party's internal disciplinary body, for "serious violations of regulations". He was expelled from the Communist Communist Party on July 11, 2016, as he had "took bribes, interfered in the anti-graft agency’s inspection and violated state-owned enterprise corporate governance rules", and will face prosecution.

On May 31, 2017, Chang was sentenced to 6 years in prison for taking bribes worth 3.76 million yuan by the Intermediate People's Court in Baoding.
