= Back office =

Non-customer-facing part of an organization

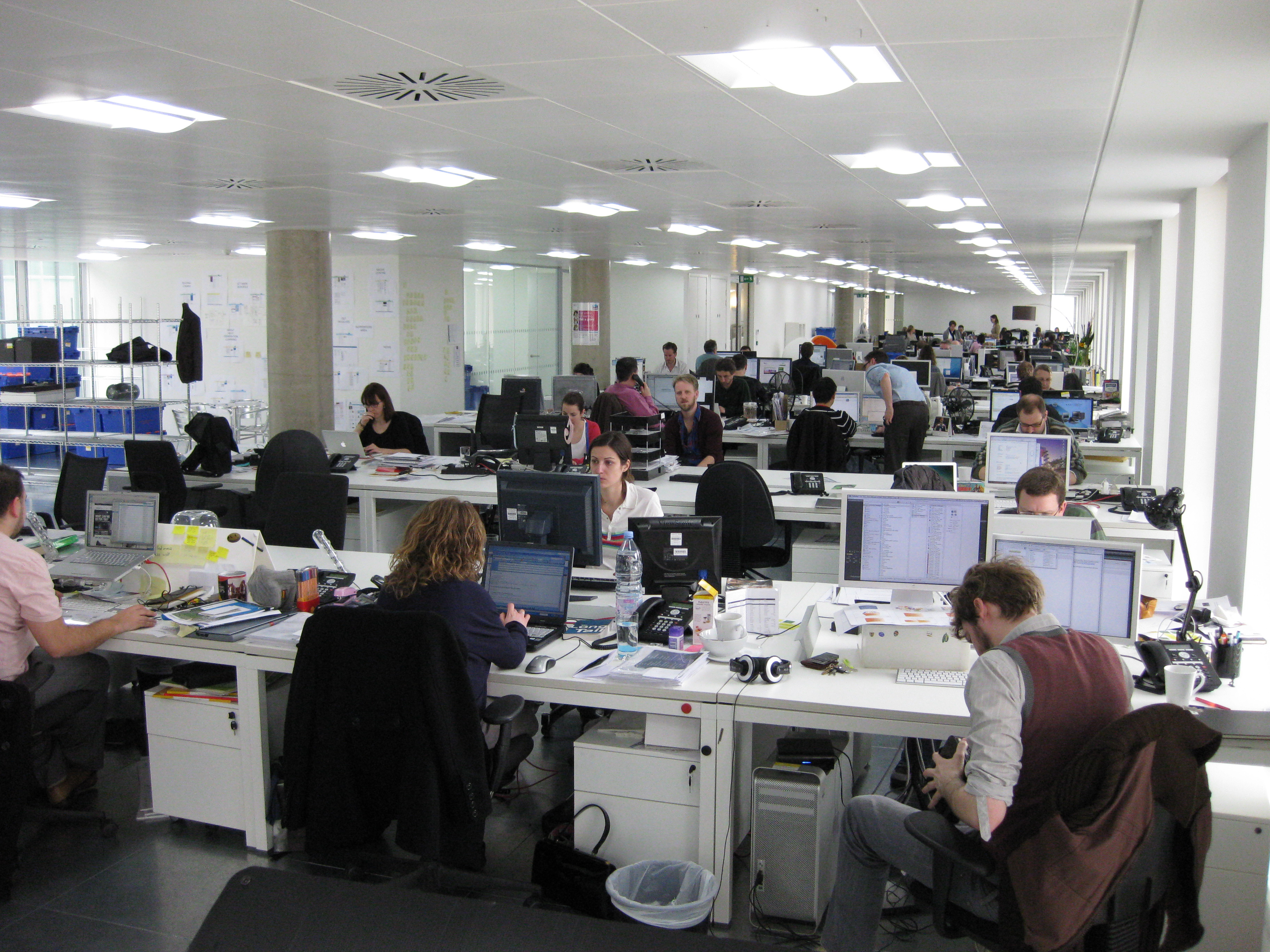
Back office workers at a company in London

A back office in most corporations is where work that supports front office work is done. The front office is the "face" of the company and is all the resources of the company that are used to make sales and interact with customers and clients. The back office is all the resources of the company that are devoted to actually creating a product or service like data entry, payroll, accounting and the other labor which is not seen by customers, such as administration or logistics. Broadly speaking, back office work includes roles that affect the costs side of a business's trading statement and front office work includes roles that affect the income side of a business's trading statement.

Although the operations of a back office are rarely prominent, they are a major contributor to a business's success. They can include functions such as accounting, planning, inventory management, supply-chain management, human resources and logistics.

Back offices are often located somewhere other than company headquarters. Many are in areas and countries with cheaper rent and lower labor costs. Some office parks provide back offices for tenants whose front offices are in more expensive neighborhoods. Back office functions can be outsourced to consultants and contractors, including ones in other countries.

== See also ==
- Front office
- Middle office
