= Front office =

Part of a company that deals with clients

The front office is the part of a company that comes in contact with clients, such as the marketing, sales, and service departments. The term has more specific meaning in different industries.

== Types ==
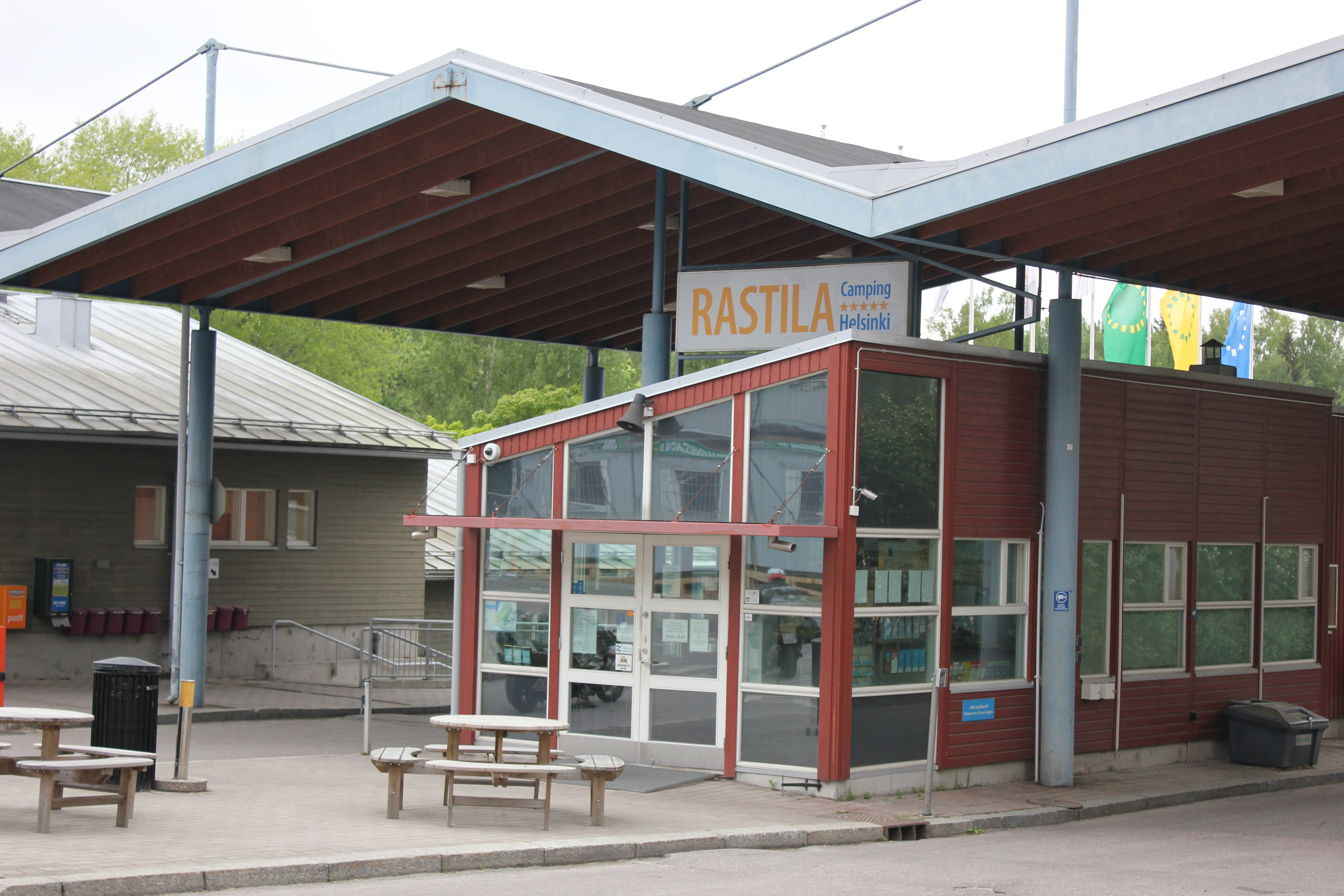
Front office of the Rastila Camping in Rastila, Helsinki, Finland

=== General offices ===
The front office deals directly with customers and is usually their first point of contact when they visit a company. Front office staff can learn more about a customer's needs by asking questions and helping them.

Front office staff may also handle routine tasks such as sorting email, printing and typing, and need to be able to use office equipment such as printers, fax machines and telephones. Training is therefore usually needed before staff begin work, even for simple tasks. Front office work typically combines contact with customers and support for the rest of the office.

Other simple tasks, like taking customers’ jackets or serving drinks to customers might also be part of the front office staff's job.

=== Hotel ===
In a hotel, the front office is where guests first arrive and check in at the front desk. Front desk staff also help guests with problems and complaints.

The hotel front office, also called the reception area, is staffed by receptionists who deal with guests, confirm their reservations and answer their questions. Receptionists also answer phone calls, welcome guests and help them check out.

Lobby staff are also part of the front office because they deal with guests directly, for example by showing them around and carrying their luggage. A hotel front office can include reception, guest services, mail and information, the concierge and cashiers.

=== Banking ===
In investment banking, the front office mainly handles sales and trading.

=== Sports ===
In professional sports, the front office is a team's management. It deals with the players and organizes their activities, and its staff usually hold the most senior positions in the team.

== Challenges faced by front offices ==
Front office staff may have low motivation because their work is repetitive. Because they deal with customers more than other employees, this can affect a company's efficiency and profitability. Front office staff can also experience high stress from dealing with difficult customers and frequent complaints, which can make it hard to maintain good service.

== See also ==
- Front of house — a synonym of front office used by facilities management industry, or a similar term used in arts and entertainment venues for business of dealing with customers
- Middle office
- Back office
