= Jingjing =

Jingjing or Jing Jing may refer to:

- Jingjing (monk), 8th-century Christian monk in China
- Jingjing and Chacha, mascots of the Internet Surveillance Division of the Public Security Bureau in Shenzhen, China
- One of the Fuwa, mascots of the 2008 Summer Olympics

== People with the given name ==
- Jing Jing Luo (born 1953), Chinese composer
- Guo Jingjing (born 1981), Chinese diver
- Jing-Jing Lee (born 1985), Singaporean author
- Li Jingjing (canoeist) (born 1985), Chinese slalom canoer
- Li Jingjing (rower) (born 1994), Chinese rower
- Jingjing Liang, forest ecologist and academic
