= Big mama =

Internet censor in China

Big mama (Chinese: 大妈; pinyin: dà mā) is a Chinese language neologism for an Internet censor on web bulletin board systems in the People's Republic of China.

Big mamas are human censors and moderators on different online platforms who remove politically sensitive information, comments and postings on news forums and chatrooms. The Chinese government also has a team of censors and internet police to monitor internet content; however, it is not possible for them to control the whole internet. Yale Global calls all Chinese censors, including the internet police, big mamas. However, big mamas are generally understood as censors working in the private sector. Private sector companies have a market interest to self-censor their websites and users' comments to fall in line with the Chinese government's internet goals, economic and industrial Chinese development. Private companies use many technologies to censor themselves and their users, one of which is hiring teams of computer workers and programmers, called big mamas, to censor the content of website forums, chatrooms, comment sections and bulletin board systems. Big mamas are prevalent across many companies and have led to a larger discourse on censorship that can be compared to the Western idea of Big Brother on a smaller scale.

== Technology and process ==
A study of the site Sina Weibo, a microblogging site, was conducted by BBC to see how quickly censors removed material and gain insight about big mamas. The study concluded many things including that those who are censored often are censored at a faster rate. Around 90% of politically risky content is removed in the first 24 hours, 5% within 8 minutes and 30% in the first half hour. It also concluded just for the site Sina Weibo, a social media platform, there would have to be at least 4,000 monitors if none of the process was automated. The job of big mamas is becoming more automated as technology becomes more advanced.

China has allowed foreign companies to be part of the market and has relied on foreign technologies and companies to maintain censorship.

== Examples ==
China has allowed foreign companies to invest and be part of the Chinese internet. In order to maintain a piece of the market these foreign companies, like Yahoo, follow Chinese censorship regulations, often by hiring big mamas to monitor bulletin board content.

Yahoo is the most common example of a private company in China that uses big mamas. The chatrooms are censored in real time; when someone posts a politically risky comment big mamas send them an email warning from Yahoo and their post cannot be seen by others. Yahoo in 2002 signed a Public Pledge on Self-discipline (known as The Pledge) promising to regulate chatrooms in line with the Chinese governments laws and regulations. Approximately 300 other companies signed this pledge, many of which also use big mamas and other technologies to censor users and information. All chatrooms and bulletin board systems and news agencies in Chinese cyberspace have a big mama that decide what content is acceptable and what content needs removed.

== Self-censorship ==
The role of big mamas can be compared to the western concept of Big Brother. The pressure of self-regulation on private web companies from the government and market encourages them to self-censor and censor their users. The Pledge is an example of self-discipline and censorship that has been codified and signed by many web companies in China. The Pledge promised to remove harmful information from the internet.

The censorship by companies of their chatrooms and bulletin boards has led their users to censor themselves to avoid being censored or punished. Lokman Tsui, who has written about big mamas, calls this concept the digital panopticon. Every level of a network regulates itself and censors the level below; this works all the way down to big mamas who moderate chatrooms down to users who regulate each-other's behavior.

Big mama has created a discourse of self-censorship and control; as Lokman Tsui wrote "Big Mama is watching you". When users censor themselves at a smaller level it is more effective than direct censorship from the top. Big mamas have led to both societal and self-censorship that is beyond government-controlled top-down censorship.

== Etymology ==
The name is derived from the name for the wife of the eldest uncle, who in traditional Chinese families has the responsibility to take care of everyone. Big mamas act quite openly and are not reluctant to admit the fact that they are censoring and why they are doing so. The actions of big mamas are generally taken more with annoyance and amusement than with alarm, and there is often some humorous bantering with big mama.

== See also ==
- 50 Cent Party
- Big Brother (1984)
- Internet censorship in the People's Republic of China
- Jingjing and Chacha
