= 知道 =

知道, meaning "know, way" or "understand", may refer to:

- Baidu Knows (百度知道), Chinese language collaborative web-based collective intelligence
- Knowing (知道), 1992 single by Taiwanese singer Jeff Chang
- Tomomichi Nishimura (西村 知道, born 1946), Japanese actor, voice actor and narrator

== See also ==
- Tomomichi
- Zhidao (disambiguation)
