= Li Mingyuan (businessman) =

Chinese business executive (born 1983)

- 李明远
- Born: October 25, 1983 (age 42); Lanzhou, Gansu, China
- Other names: Eric Li
- Occupation: Business executive
- Known for: Vice president of the search engine Baidu

Li Mingyuan or Eric Li (Chinese: 李明远; pinyin: Lǐ Míngyuǎn; born 25 October 1983) is a Chinese business executive who is the vice president of the Chinese search engine Baidu. He joined Baidu in 2004, and prior to his current position, Li was product manager of Baidu Tieba, general manager of E-Commerce Business Division and general manager of Baidu Mobile Cloud BU.

== Early life and education ==
In 2001, Li Mingyuan attended Communication University of China, majoring in Radio and Television Playwright-director. In college, Li worked as "YTHT BBS" forum administrator, addressed as 'vitamin'. Li received his bachelor's degree in literature. In 2011 he obtained and an MBA from the China Europe International Business School (CEIBS).

== Career ==
In 2004, Li accepted the invitation from Yu Jun (VP of Baidu) to join the newly established Baidu Tieba and became the first product manager of Baidu Tieba.

From 2004 to 2007, Li led and completed design of Baidu Tieba, Baidu Knows, Baidu Encyclopedia and other online community products. He was responsible for user products marketing division and online product management division.

In 2007, Li became the general manager of the first independent business unit in Baidu history - E-Commerce Business Division, and was responsible for its Baidu Youa and Baifubao as well as other business.

In 2010, Li left Baidu and began his study at the CEIBS for his MBA. During that time he joined UC Web Beijing as vice president of product, and was responsible for design of new mobile Internet SNS platform -UC Heaven and management of a number of company business. By the end of 2011, Li Mingyuan returned to Baidu as senior director of Baidu Mobile • Cloud BU;

In February 2012, Li was promoted as general manager of Baidu Mobile • Cloud BU;

In July 2013, Li was promoted to vice president of Baidu, and became the youngest vice president in Baidu history. Same year, Li Mingyuan was elected as‘2013 China's business elite under 40 years of age’ by Fortune magazine.

In July 2014, Li was promoted as E-Staff member in Baidu, and officially became a member of Baidu core management team.
