= Cyber police =

Cyber police are police departments or government agencies in charge of stopping cybercrime. Examples include:

- Cyber Crime Investigation Cell, the cybercrime unit of the Greater Mumbai Police
- FBI Cyber Division, the cybercrime unit of the Federal Bureau of Investigation
- Iranian Cyber Police, the cybercrime unit of the Islamic Republic of Iran Police

Cyber police or Cybercops may also refer to:

== Internet ==
- Internet forum moderators, users or employees of an Internet forum who are granted access to the posts and threads of all members for the purpose of moderating discussion and also keeping the forum clean
- Internet police, a generic term for police and government agencies, departments and other organizations in charge of policing the Internet in a number of countries
- An internet meme amid the Jessi Slaughter sexual abuse and cyberbullying case
- Jingjing and Chacha, the cartoon mascots of the Internet Surveillance Division of the Public Security Bureau in Shenzhen, People's Republic of China

== Arts and entertainment ==
- COPS (animated TV series), also known as CyberCOPS, a Canadian-American animated television series
- Corporation (video game), also known as Cyber-Cop, a 1990 video game
- Cyber Police, a fictional organization in the original video animation Cyber City Oedo 808
- Cyber Police ESWAT, a 1989 video game
- "Cyberpolice", a song by Kim-Lian from the 2004 album Balance
- Dennou Keisatsu Cybercop, a Japanese tokusatsu television series
