= National online identity authentication =

Online identification method used in China

- Simplified Chinese: 国家网络身份认证
- Traditional Chinese: 國家網路身分認證
Transcriptions
Standard Mandarin
- Hanyu Pinyin: Guójiā wǎngluò shēnfèn rènzhèng

National online identity authentication is an online real-name authentication method in the People's Republic of China. It is promoted by the Ministry of Public Security and the Cyberspace Administration of China.

Through the National Network Identity Authentication app, Chinese netizens are able to submit their personal information to receive an "Internet certificate", a unique code that can be used to verify real-name identities and access online accounts. They no longer need to disclose their personal information to private companies and online platforms in order to use online services, though government authorities continue to have access to such information. The policy caused considerable debate after its release.

== Background ==
In the 2010s, China started implementing an Internet real-name system, requiring netizens to submit personal information such as ID or phone numbers while using online services by Internet companies. An official ID has been required to register a mobile phone number since 2010, while a real-name system was established for instant messaging, microblogs, online forums and other websites in 2017.

== History ==
On 26 July 2024, the Ministry of Public Security and the Cyberspace Administration of China issued the "National Network Identity Authentication Public Service Management Measures (Draft for Comments)" on the grounds of strengthening the protection of citizens' personal information. The laws and regulations are based on the Cybersecurity Law implemented in 2017, the Data Security Law implemented in 2021, the Personal Information Protection Law implemented in 2021, and the Anti-Telecom Network Fraud Law implemented in 2022.

On 23 May 2025, the Ministry of Public Security, the Cyberspace Administration of China, the Ministry of Civil Affairs, the Ministry of Culture and Tourism, the National Health Commission, the National Radio and Television Administration and other six departments jointly announced the National Internet Identity Authentication Public Service Management Measures, which came into effect on 15 July. The Measures stipulate that the application for Internet numbers and Internet certificates is voluntary. Natural persons under the age of 14 must obtain the consent of their parents or other guardians and apply on their behalf; natural persons who are at least 14 years old but under 18 years old must apply under the supervision of their parents or other guardians.

== Application ==
The beta version of the National Network Identity Authentication app developed by the Ministry of Public Security was first launched on 27 June 2023. As of 1 Augustt 2024, 67 apps have launched the "online ID card" pilot program, including some government apps and Internet apps, such as the National Government Service Platform and local government service apps in Sichuan, Shandong, Jiangsu and other provinces, China Railway 12306, Taobao, WeChat, Xiaohongshu, and QQ.

On 28 August 2024, according to China Business News, Anhui's "Anshitong" App introduced national online identity authentication, and the original Alipay authentication has been cancelled. The lower left corner of the login page displays "national online identity authentication" or "electronic social security card", and the original "Alipay" authentication has been cancelled. In addition, the App system also prompts that the above page does not support screenshots, "due to application restrictions, this interface cannot be screenshotted"; on Alipay, it is still possible to log in to the "Anshitong" applet, but it has also added the "online certificate assistant" function.

That evening, the official WeChat public account of Anhui Tong responded that the quick login method would be restored after the optimization and upgrade was completed. The "Announcement on the Optimization and Upgrade of the Quick Login Function of Anhui Tong App" stated that during the optimization and upgrade of the quick login function of Anhui Tong App, users who entered the Anhui Tong App through the quick login method would be affected. The quick login method would be restored after the optimization and upgrade was completed. As of May 2025, the National Network Identity Authentication App has been downloaded over 16 million times, has 6 million users, and has provided authentication services over 12.5 million times.

The system was officially launched on 15 July 2025.

== Features ==
To apply for an online ID in the National Network Identity Authentication app, a netizen needs a mobile phone with near-field communication (NFC) function, perform ID NFC recognition and face recognition, and associate their mobile phone number; if minors aged 8 and above apply for an online ID, they need to verify the identity of their guardian. The app issues an encrypted virtual ID made up of random letters and digits, which can be used when accessing websites and online applications. This means that the person's real name and ID number are not given to the online platforms, though they remain accessible by government authorities.
