= Li Mingyuan =

Li Mingyuan may refer to:

- Li Mingyuan (businessman) (born 1983), Chinese business executive
- Li Mingyuan (politician) (born 1965), Chinese politician
