= Public Pledge on Self-Discipline for the Chinese Internet Industry =

2002 agreement on censorship

The Public Pledge on Self-Discipline for the Chinese Internet Industry is a 2002 agreement between the Internet Society of China and companies that operate sites in China. In signing the agreement, web companies are pledging to identify and prevent the transmission of information that Chinese authorities deem objectionable, including information that "breaks laws or spreads superstition or obscenity", or that "may jeopardize state security and disrupt social stability".

== Origins and purpose ==
The pledge was created in 2002 by the Internet Society of China, a self-governing Chinese internet industry body, and within a month of launch had been signed by more than 100 Chinese web companies such as Baidu, Soseen, Sina, and Sohu, as well as by Peking University, Tsinghua University, and Chinese government offices. The pledge contains four chapters and 31 articles covering four "principles of self-discipline for the Internet industry"—patriotism, observance of the law, fairness, and trustworthiness. Signing it is officially optional, but without having signed it firms are ineligible to receive a Chinese Internet Content Provider license, which is required to obtain a .cn domain.

== Current status ==
As of 2006, the pledge had been signed by more than 3,000 entities operating websites in China.

== Criticism ==
The pledge has been criticized by human rights and freedom of expression organizations such as Amnesty International, Human Rights Watch, Reporters Without Borders, and the Committee to Protect Journalists. American firms have been criticized as compromising American values related to freedom of speech in order to make money by signing it.

== Non-Chinese web companies ==
Non-Chinese web companies maintain that in order to do business in China they must comply with local laws and regulations, that access to censored information is better than no information at all, and that their presence in China will support economic development leading to political change. But, critics argue their activities are facilitating and sanctioning government censorship rather than challenging it.

In 2002 Yahoo signed the pledge. Two years later, it disclosed to the Chinese government that journalist Shi Tao had sent an e-mail to a New York-based site containing notes from a Chinese government directive on how to handle the 15th anniversary of the Tiananmen Square protests of 1989. Shi Tao was then arrested, convicted, and given a 10-year prison term on a charge of divulging state secrets. This earned Yahoo! significant criticism from Reporters Without Borders and others, including a statement by the chair of the United States House Foreign Affairs Committee Tom Lantos that while Yahoo is technologically and financially "giants", "morally you are pygmies".

In 2005 Microsoft signed the pledge. Later in 2005, it deleted from Windows Live Spaces the blog of Chinese journalist and political blogger Jing Zhao, who was known for his writings about freedom of the press in China. The incident made headlines around the world and contributed to ongoing debates about the role of Western companies in China's censorship system.

In 2006 Google signed the pledge and then launched a censored version of its search engine, called Google.cn, inside China. Before Google.cn, users in China had only been able to reach Google by going through small sometimes-unreliable local service providers. Establishing Google.cn means that for the first time users in China could reach Google directly, making the user experience faster and more reliable. But the move was controversial inside and outside of Google, and on March 23, 2010, Google shut down Google.cn.

== See also ==
- Internet censorship in the People's Republic of China
- History of Internet censorship in the People's Republic of China
- Great Firewall of China
- List of websites blocked in China
