= Michael Anti =

Michael Anti may refer to:

- Michael Anti (journalist) (born 1975), Chinese journalist and political blogger
- Michael Anti (sport shooter) (born 1964), American sport shooter
