= Internet real-name system in China =

Chinese government policy

The Internet real-name system in China (Chinese: 网络实名制; pinyin: Wǎngluò shímíngzhì) is a real-name system in which Internet service providers and online platforms (especially user-generated content sites) in the People's Republic of China are required to collect users' real names, ID numbers, and other information when providing services.

In 2012 the Standing Committee of the National People's Congress adopted the Decision on Strengthening Network Information Protection, which required individuals to disclose their identities to network service providers to obtain or use services such as phone service, internet access, and posting on social media. In 2015, the Cyberspace Administration of China announced a Provision requiring users to sign up with their real name on internet services. The real-name system was codified in the Cybersecurity Law in 2016. Starting from 2016, use of cell phone numbers in mainland China have been required to be registered with real names. In 2017, the Cyberspace Administration of China announced regulations requiring online platforms to request and verify real names and other personal information from users when they register, leading China's largest apps to start implementing the system.

In 2020, a real-name authentication system for online games was announced. Since 2022, several Chinese social platforms announced that they would display user locations based on internet protocol (IP) addresses. In 2023, several large platforms announced they would make public the real names of accounts with more than 500,000 followers. In 2025, China launched the national online identity authentication system, allowing netizens to submit their personal information to receive an "Internet certificate", a unique code that can be used to verify real-name identities and access online accounts. In November 2025, it was announced that artificial intelligence companies would need to require users to register with a phone number or national ID. In January 2026, the Cybercrime Prevention and Control Law was proposed, which lays out punishments for individuals attempting to bypass the Internet real-name system.

Since the implementation of the real-name system on the Internet may lead to the infringement and narrowing of the constitutionally protected speech space of Internet users, it has attracted concerns and generated controversy in Chinese society. A few other countries, such as South Korea, have implemented a real-name system on the Internet.

== History ==
=== Proposals to ban anonymity ===
The origin of the proposed ban on anonymity in mainland China is generally believed to be the proposal made by Li Xiguang, a journalism professor at Tsinghua University, in 2002, when he talked about journalism reform in the South, that "the Chinese National People's Congress should ban anyone from being anonymous online". He argued that the Internet should be strictly protected by copyright and intellectual property rights, and that "at the same time, online writing should be legally responsible," and that "including traditional media, we should promote the use of real names, not pseudonyms... publishing under pseudonyms is irresponsible to the public."

His remarks caused an uproar on the Internet and became known as the "Li Xiguang incident". Although there was a period of heated debate, no corresponding measures were subsequently introduced and the matter was left unresolved. Afterwards, Li Xiguang himself said that he had lost interest in the topic of real names on the Internet, and that "banning online anonymity is very unrealistic and not legally or technically feasible."

=== Legislation ===
In January 2008, the legislative process of the real-name Internet system was launched. In August 2008, the Ministry of Industry and Information Technology (MIIT) formally responded to the proposed legislation on the real-name system, which was not passed, but stated that "realizing the management of limited real-name network" would be the direction of the future healthy development of the Internet. On December 28, 2012, the Standing Committee of the National People's Congress (NPCSC) adopted the Decision on Strengthening Network Information Protection. The decision requires service providers to require users to provide identity information when they obtain or use services including phone services, internet access, posting on social media.

The State Council's institutional reform plan, released on March 29, 2013, mandated that the Ministry of Industry and Information Technology, the Cyberspace Administration of China, and the Ministry of Public Security introduce and implement a real name registration system by July 2014. On November 6, 2014, the State Internet Information Office held a special meeting on the management of follow-up comments and required 29 websites to sign the "Commitment to Self-Discipline Management of Follow-up Comments. The third article of the "Commitment", "insisting that users register their accounts with real identity information", is considered to require the mandatory use of real-name accounts to post comments. However, the plan was delayed. In January 2015, the Cyberspace Administration of China announced that it would fully promote the real name registration system within that year.

In February 2015, the Cyberspace Administration of China introduced Provisions on the Administration of Account Names of Internet Users. Article 5 of these provisions requires internet information service providers to ensure that users register accounts after undergoing real identity information authentication. It requires that users of blogs, microblogs, instant-messaging services, online discussion forums, news comment sections and related services register with their real names; users are still allowed to select their own usernames and avatars as long as they do not involve "illegal or unhealthy" content. This effectively imposed real name policies on all internet services in China.

Article 24 of the Cybersecurity Law of the People's Republic of China, adopted on November 7, 2016, provides that "network operators shall require users to provide real identity information when signing agreements with users or confirming the provision of services for network access, domain name registration services, and network entry procedures for fixed and mobile telephones, or providing information dissemination and instant messaging services for users. If users do not provide real identity information, the network operator shall not provide relevant services for them." This is the first time in China that the real-name system in was codified in the form of a law.

On August 25, 2017, the Cyberspace Administration of China announced the Regulations on the Administration of Internet Follow-Up Commenting Services, which came into effect on October 1, 2017. The regulations establish a real-name system for internet platforms by requiring websites operators and service providers to request and verify real names and other personal information from users when they register. The regulations also stipulate that websites shall not provide commenting services to users without real-name authentication, and user comments on news information shall be reviewed before publication. On September 1, 2017, the Ministry of Industry and Information Technology announced that the Internet Domain Name Management Measures, which came into effect on November 1, 2017. On September 7, 2017, the Cyberspace Administration of China issued the Regulations on the Administration of Internet Group Information Services, which came into effect on October 8, 2017.

On July 26, 2024, the Ministry of Public Security and the Cyberspace Administration of China issued the "National Network Identity Authentication Public Service Management Measures (Draft for Comments)", proposing the national online identity authentication system. On May 23, 2025, the Ministry of Public Security, the Cyberspace Administration of China, the Ministry of Civil Affairs, the Ministry of Culture and Tourism, the National Health Commission, the National Radio and Television Administration and other six departments jointly announced the National Internet Identity Authentication Public Service Management Measures, which came into effect on July 15. In English, the title of the Measures would translate to "National Online Identify Verification Service Administrative Procedures". These procedures establish a government platform that issues alphanumeric unique identifiers and authentication credentials that link to a user's verified identity without exposing raw identity data to private services. Under the procedures, online service providers that connect to the system may rely on these identifiers to meet identity verification requirements and, for users who choose this option, may not request additional raw identity data unless legally required or with express user consent. Where the law requires only that a user's identity be verified and not that identification document details be stored, the public service provides platforms with a verification confirmation rather than transmitting the user's identity information.

The draft Cybercrime Prevention and Control Law was released to the public for comments by the Ministry of Public Security on 31 January 2026. The Chapter II of the law, titled the Management of Basic Network Resources, mainly deals with the Internet real-name system. Articles 11, 12 and 13 of the law lays out prohibited user conduct, including the usage fake IDs to open accounts or sharing network and phone connections, payment methods, information-sharing accounts, and web hosting. These conducts are listed as administrative violations, with punishments including fines and possible detention of up to 15 days. Agencies are also authorized to blacklist offending individuals or organizations and require service providers to restrict blacklisted users' access to services. Articles 16 and 17 mandate additional verification where there is irregular account activity, and allows government agencies to request either new verification of specific accounts or a general increase in reverification frequency for areas or times of high criminal activity. It states that users who fail verification may potentially face restricted or terminated functionality, though they are entitled to automatic review, with services restored once verification is successfully completed.

== Status ==
=== Internet cafes ===
Beginning in 2003, Internet cafe management authorities across China began requiring all customers accessing the Internet at Internet cafes to present their ID cards to the cafes, register in their real names, and apply for one-card and IC cards, on the grounds of preventing minors from entering the cafes.

=== Emails ===
On May 13, 2004, the Internet Society of China issued the Internet E-mail Service Standard (Draft for Public Comments), which proposed the real-name system for the first time and emphasized that e-mail service providers should require customers to submit real customer information, which would be the standard for judging the attribution of mailbox services. However, the Internet E-mail Service Standard, which came into effect on March 20, 2006, only adopted a registration system for e-mail server IP addresses. In addition, on September 26, 2004, the China Youth Network Association, which is supervised by the Communist Youth League of China, established a professional committee for games and decided to establish a national gamers' club for Chinese youth in the coming year to lay the foundation for implementing a real-name system in online games.

=== Websites and apps ===
On May 18, 2004, websites implementing the site-wide real-name system appeared. In 2005, the Ministry of Information Industry (MIIT), in conjunction with relevant departments, required all website organizers in the territory to register for the record through IDCs and ISPs that provide access, hosting, and content services for websites, or log on to the MIIT record website to file themselves. Whether it is a corporate or institutional website, or a personal website, all must provide a valid document number at the time of filing. The Communications Regulatory Authority will temporarily shut down websites that have not reported relevant information to the record management system by midnight on June 30, and notify the relevant access service providers to temporarily stop their access services. The person in charge of the Telecommunications Administration of the Ministry of Information Industry urged the temporarily closed websites to make up for the filing procedures before midnight on July 10, otherwise they will be closed.

In 2004, the Opinions on Further Strengthening Campus Network Management of Higher Education Institutions issued by the Chinese Ministry of Education (MOE) explicitly proposed to implement the real-name system in college education networks, and became an important basis for the MOE to conduct audits on Chinese colleges and universities. By March 2005, a number of major universities' BBS, led by Shuimu Qinghua BBS of Tsinghua University, changed to the real-name only intra-campus communication platform.

In October 2006, the Ministry of Information Industry of the People's Republic of China proposed to implement a real-name system for blogs, which aroused great opposition online. In March 2007, the Internet Society of China issued a message that the Internet Society of China was promoting a real-name system for blogs, which was considered by the media to be a foregone conclusion. Previously, there were already blog service providers in China that launched blog sites with real-name registration system for the whole site. On May 28, 2007, a few websites had implemented the third anniversary of the real-name system. On April 13, 2010, the People's Daily published an op-ed: Lin Yongqing: The Argument of the Pros and Cons of the Real-Name System. On March 16, 2012, Sina, Sohu, NetEase, and Tencent Weibo officially implemented the real-name system for microblogs.

In May 2016, Alipay implemented a real-name system in response to strict regulation by relevant authorities, but it was subsequently pushed back to July 1. According to the Measures for the Administration of Network Payment Business of Non-Bank Payment Institutions, network payment business operated by non-bank payment institutions is governed by a real-name system, and all users need to register with their real names in order to use the network payment business.

In May 2017, Baidu began prompting users when logging in, "In response to national legal requirements, a real name account is required to use Internet services from 6/1. To ensure the normal usage of your Baidu account, please complete cell phone number verification as soon as possible.", and accounts can no longer be registered with an email address, and you must use a Chinese cell phone number to complete registration. On May 22, 2017, following Baidu's announcement to implement a real-name system, Zhihu announced that it would gradually implement account real-name authentication. On July 5, 2017, Bilibili announced that real-name authentication was required for submissions, and domestic users were required to bind their cell phone numbers, while overseas users were required to upload proof of identity in addition to their cell phone numbers. On September 22, 2017, Bilibili announced that it would strengthen its real-name authentication mechanism: from September 29, 2017, accounts that had not completed binding their cell phone numbers could not perform operations such as submitting articles, posting pop-ups, sending private messages and comments.

Since 2022, several Chinese social platforms announced that they would display user locations based on internet protocol (IP) addresses. These platforms include Quora-like Zhihu, the domestic version of TikTok, Douyin, and video streaming platform Bilibili. The platforms display the province for users located in China or the country or region if the IP address of the user is located overseas. Users cannot disable this feature. On 31 October 2023, WeChat Public, Sina Weibo, Baidu, Douyin, Today's Headlines, Xiaohongshu, Zhihu, BiliBili, and Kuaishou announced that they would make public the real names of accounts with more than 500,000 followers.

On July 15, 2025, China officially launched the national online identity authentication system, allowing Chinese netizens are able to submit their personal information to receive an "Internet certificate", a unique code that can be used to verify real-name identities and access online accounts. They no longer need to disclose their personal information to private companies and online platforms in order to use online services, though government authorities continue to have access to such information. In November 2025, China launched a document regarding artificial intelligence, requiring AI companies to implement a real-name system by requiring users to register with a phone number or national ID.

=== Online gaming ===
On July 20, 2005, Tencent, the largest instant messaging company in China, issued an announcement that it would cooperate with the Chinese authorities to organize the online public information services carried out by Tencent and register the creators and administrators of QQ groups under their real names in accordance with the Notice of the Shenzhen Public Security Bureau on Cleaning and Rectifying Online Public Information Service Sites. This coincided with media coverage of the real-name system in South Korea, and Tencent's initiative was widely seen as "a prelude to the full implementation of the real-name system in China."

On July 22, 2005, Xinhua said that from July 22 to the end of September, the police in Shenzhen, China, will carry out a three-month cleanup and improvement of online public information service sites. Among other things, the police will register BBS and BBS moderators with real names and verify ID numbers. On August 5 China's Ministry of Culture and Ministry of Information Industry jointly issued Several Opinions on the Development and Management of Online Games. The draft of the opinion says to prevent minors from indulging in online games to kill monsters and practice leveling and requires that "PK-type leveling games (relying on PK to increase level) should be logged in through ID cards, implement a real-name game system, and disallow minors from logging in". According to the Regulations on the Protection of Minors' Network (draft for review), "network information service providers providing online game services shall require online game users to provide real identity information for registration and effectively identify minor users. It also stipulates that network information service providers shall, in accordance with relevant national regulations and standards, take technical measures to not expose minors to games or game functions that are inappropriate for them to access, limit the time minors can use games continuously and the cumulative time they can use games in a single day, and prohibit minors from using online game services between midnight and 8:00 AM every day."

In July 2020, Feng Shixin, an official from the Publicity Department, announced a real-name authentication system for online games by September. On August 30, 2021, the National Press and Publication Administration issued the Notice of the State Press and Publication Administration on Further Strict Management to Effectively Prevent Minors from Being Addicted to Online Games, which stipulates that all online game enterprises may only provide online game services to minors for one hour from 20:00 to 21:00 daily on Fridays, Saturdays, Sundays and legal holidays, and may not provide online game services to minors in any form at other times.

=== Mobile phone numbers ===
An official ID has been required to register a mobile phone number since 2010. Starting in 2016, the use of cell phone numbers in mainland China must be registered with real names.

=== Train tickets ===
In 2012, China started implementing a real-name system for buying train tickets, requiring passengers to provide their ID numbers when buying tickets.

== Reactions ==
Opponents argue the potential for a chilling effect, with many believing that "the charm of the Internet lies in anonymity", and that the system restricts the freedom of expression of users for fear of real-world consequences. Supporters point to the nature of the Internet as a vessel for more efficient communication rather than unrestricted expression, arguing that a lower rate of spam, fraud, and other malicious content fosters a more credible online environment. Conversely, some advocate a "dual method" that requires real-name registration for formal sites, but allows anonymity on forums or small sites.

Privacy concerns are also commonly raised, including the exacerbated implications of a potential data breach and ease of identity theft or targeted fraud.

== Related laws ==
- Decision of the Standing Committee of the National People's Congress on Strengthening the Protection of Internet Information
- Measures for the Administration of Internet Information Services (Order of the State Council No. 292)
- Non-operating Internet Information Services Record Management Measures (Ministry of Information Industry Decree No. 33)
- Counterterrorism Law of the People's Republic of China
- Cybersecurity Law of the People's Republic of China

== See also ==
- Internet censorship in China
- Real-name system
- Human flesh search engine
- Doxxing
- Human rights in China
- Online age verification laws by country
