= 263.net =

Chinese Internet service provider

net263 co., ltd or commonly known as 263.net is a Chinese Internet service provider said to be named after the number they used for dial-up access to the Internet. In 2002, the company was sued for breach of contract after attempting to transition to a paid email service, which would have affected 12 million active users.

== See also ==
- ICP license
