= Internet Domain Name Management Measures =

Chinese government regulation

Ministry of Industry and Information Technology
- Enacted by: Ministry of Industry and Information Technology
- Signed: 1 September 2017
- Effective: 1 November 2017
- Status: In force

The Internet Domain Name Management Measures is a departmental regulation in effect in China. The revision of this departmental regulation was publicly solicited for opinions on March 25, 2016, with the aim of supervising Internet domain name registration services and implementing the Internet real-name system in China.

On September 1, 2017, the Ministry of Industry and Information Technology announced that the revised Internet Domain Name Management Measures would come into effect on November 1, 2017.

== History ==
In March 2002, the Ministry of Information Industry passed the "Measures for the Administration of Internet Domain Names in China" at its ministerial meeting, which came into effect in September 2002. The main contents of the regulations are that domain name registration service providers must file for record, the conditions and methods of filing for record, and other rules. On April 30, 2015, it was mentioned that the regulations would be comprehensively revised. In November of the same year, the Policy and Regulation Department and the Information and Communications Administration of the Ministry of Industry and Information Technology organized a legislative symposium on Internet domain name management in Weihai. Later, the Policy and Regulation Department issued a press release stating that "after discussion and exchange, the necessity of revising the 'Measures' was further clarified".

=== Amendment ===
On March 25, 2016, the Ministry of Industry and Information Technology announced on its government website that it had drafted the "Internet Domain Name Management Measures (Revised Draft for Solicitation of Opinions)" and solicited opinions from the public. The Ministry of Industry and Information Technology stated that the purpose was to "regulate Internet domain name service activities, protect the legitimate rights and interests of users, ensure the safe and reliable operation of the Internet domain name system, promote the development and application of Chinese domain names and national top-level domain names, and promote the healthy development of the Internet in China. Implement the relevant provisions of the "Decision of the State Council on Canceling and Adjusting a Batch of Administrative Approval Items and Other Matters" and draft the draft. The collection of opinions lasted for one month. On December 27, 2016, the Ministry of Industry and Information Technology stated on its website that one of the key tasks for 2017 was the "Special Action for Internet Basic Management" and that it would "improve the linkage management mechanism of domain names, IP addresses and websites" and "strictly implement the real-name registration system for domain names and promote the introduction of relevant standards such as real-name domain names".

On January 11, 2017, Xinhua News Agency reported that the revision of the Internet Domain Name Management Measures was "nearly completed and is expected to be released soon". On September 1, 2017, the Ministry of Industry and Information Technology of the People's Republic of China announced that the "Measures for the Administration of Internet Domain Names" (Order No. 43 of the Ministry of Industry and Information Technology of the People's Republic of China) had been reviewed and approved at the 32nd ministerial meeting of the Ministry of Industry and Information Technology on August 16, 2017, and the regulations would come into effect on November 1, 2017. The "Measures for the Administration of Internet Domain Names in China" (Order No. 30 of the former Ministry of Information Industry) promulgated on November 5, 2004, was repealed at the same time.

== Reactions ==
Some experts believe that the revised Domain Name Management Law means that overseas institutions that want to develop business in China should "cooperate with China". Xu Luowen, a network policy expert at the Chinese University of Hong Kong, said that the provisions of the Measures are very vague and can even be used to block all domain names that are not registered in mainland China.

Some media pointed out that "in China's current website registration system, although the server is required to be in the country, the domain name can be overseas. Therefore, even if the server of some websites is blocked, the domain name owner still has the opportunity to rebuild; but the new 'Measures' allow the server and domain name of domestic websites to be blocked at the same time, completely losing the opportunity to rebuild." Or it is believed that "if this regulation applies to all websites, it will have a significant impact, and its effect is to separate China from the global Internet."

=== Official response ===
On March 30, 2016, the Ministry of Industry and Information Technology stated that "the measures do not fundamentally conflict with the global domain name management system. The relevant provisions mainly require that websites accessed within the territory should use domain names registered within the territory, do not involve websites accessed outside the territory, do not affect users' access to relevant network content, and do not affect the normal business operations of foreign companies in China".
