= SMTH BBS =

Shuimu Tsinghua (Chinese: 水木清华; pinyin: shuǐmù qīnghuá; abbreviated as SMTH) BBS is the first and one of the most popular bulletin board system sites among the universities in China. Hosted by Tsinghua University, it is recognized for its diversity and depth of topics.

Access to the SMTH BBS was restricted to on-campus IPs since March 16, 2005, effectively blocking away a substantial portion of its contributors, ranging from graduates living overseas to students from other universities in China. A small protest was held at elite university against tightening government censorship on the Internet.

Early in 2006, the SMTH BBS reopened itself to the alien IPs from outside Tsinghua University, available to those who would confirm their identification using a valid email account. However, a large number of its discussion groups are still under tight control, refusing visits from the outside world.

== 1995 ==
In early August 1995, ace set up a BBS site on a Linux/i386 machine in one of the laboratories of the Tsinghua University. Later, ming and lucky joined the endeavor and transferred the system onto a Sun SPARCstation 20 with 64M memory. On August 8, the BBS formally declared open, and was named "Shui Mu Tsing Hua", often abbreviated as SMTH, which in Chinese means "Water is clear, with trees in florescence", referring to a line in an ancient poem and an actual site in Tsinghua University. The IP address then was 166.111.1.11.

In October, SMTH started to provide MUD service. Since November 27, SMTH was accessible through a service of World Wide Web (WWW). At the end of 1995, the number of the registered users at SMTH reached around several dozen.

== 1996 ==
Between March and April, the SMTH community organized a kite-flying party and received a large publicity nationwide as CCTV (China Central Television) recorded and aired the event in its Our Generation program. SMTH was accessible to the entire campus community around the end of April and saw its traffic peaked. The number of online visitors often ran to the triple digits.

September 18, 1996, radical opinions regarding Diaoyu Islands (as known in China, Senkaku Islands as known in Japan) issue appeared on many BBSes across China. The government reacted by closely monitoring these BBSes. Two sites in Peking University were temporarily shut down. SMTH was closed for one day. The following month, SMTH closed its Military, History, Salon and Time-Space Report discussion groups.

At the end of October, a new system named FireBird BBS replaced the former one. Before that, the system administrators did a massive overhaul on the original Firebird system. In November, the second version of the WWW-BBS architecture was implemented. In December, SMTH experienced a severe hard drive breakdown, resulting in the loss of two months worth of information.

== 1997 ==
In January, having recovered from its hard drive failure, SMTH reopened without WWW access. At the same time, Tsinghua University BBS Regulations came into effect. At the end of February, due to the death of Deng Xiaoping, SMTH was temporarily closed. It reopened again on the third of April, with its IP address changed to 202.112.58.200.

Late June, the SMTH community launched a fund-raising campaign for a student who fell seriously ill.

Late September, the SMTH BBS administration was established and began its first term. SMTH's management and maintenance became regularized.

== 1998 ==
On March 4th, SMTH was again closed during the period when both the National People's Congress and the Chinese People's Political Consultative Conference were on session. It reopened on April 1. In June, the site experienced another scheduled shut-down. When it was online again on June 15, users organized an offline get-together, a party they called happy98. On December 9, in the atmosphere of the Asian Games, SMTH created a temporary discussion group devoted to the news and analysis of the event, setting a precedent example for all major sports events to follow.

== 1999 ==
On May 8th, the US attacked Chinese embassy in Yugoslavia. Many users simultaneously expressed their disdain on SMTH, causing a surge in the site's traffic.

On December 18th, SMTH acquired the domains smth.org and smth.edu.cn.

== 2005 ==
The Ministry of Education of the People's Republic of China issued a mandate in 2005, demanding all university BBS sites to be reformed into campus-wide communication platforms and requiring users to register under their legal names. SMTH BBS was made to be the pioneering example for other universities to follow. In response, Tsinghua University decided to turn SMTH from a public BBS into a campus-restricted BBS effective March 16, 2005.

In the afternoon of the same day, the BBS' Administrative Committee issued "An Open Letter to All Users of SMTH", stating their stance on users outside the university. "The history of SMTH in the past decade has shown that, with a friendly community atmosphere, good academic discussion, development of informational sections and effective, strict internal site management, users outside the campus are not the cause of mismanagement, nor the source of various destabilizing elements. On the contrary, a fully open, strictly managed off-campus user community has proven to be instrumental to SMTH's vigor and quality, and hence contributes in a tremendous way to the upholding of the academic reputation of the University." The Committee went on stating that, "Users outside the campus are an extremely important source to the vibrant culture of SMTH. Come what may, SMTH will never forget its many users outside the campus, past, present or future." At the same time, many public users found they were unable to connect to SMTH normally. Instead, they were greeted with the welcome message: "Effective from today, BBS SMTH is restricted to only on-campus access. All outside IP's are blocked."

March 16, after a brief recovery of service, Lily, the BBS of Nanjing University,百合, became "read only", depriving all users of their posting privileges.

March 17, many university BBSes (including Unnamed of Peking University, Terra Cotta of Xi'an Jiaotong University, etc.) closed their public access one after another.

Meanwhile, searching keyword "Tsinghua University" in the popular Baidu search engine no longer returns the entry "Tsinghua University BBS" which used to rank the second. Similar screening has been done to other university BBSes as well.

Shortly after the blocking, students of Tsinghua University found various means to express their discontent. They produced large amount of screenshots of previous greeting messages of SMTH to express their condolences, hope or criticism.

On March 18, students of the University voluntarily organized a gathering. Many people expressed their sadness by folding numerous paper cranes.

== Aftermath ==
On March 8, 2005, the Network Research Center of Tsinghua University (NRCOTU) urged the SMTH BBS administration to block THUExpress, one of the SMTH's most visited and popular discussion group, from access by alien IPs from outside campus, and indicated that it was due to a pressure from the Ministry of Education.

On the afternoon of March 16, the NRCOTU put the machine that runs SMTH under its tight control, blocking all alien IPs outside of campus, and rewrote the telnet log-in welcome message as "From today onward, SMTH BBS has re-established itself as a campus-only site as opposed to its former publicity and offers only limited access for alien IPs."

Early on the morning of March 17, the SMTH administration issued an announcement saying the SMTH BBS was undergoing a period of abnormality with an aura of their impossibility to resolve the problem. The administration said that, under the pressure from the University, "the possibility to reverse the status quo is but zero"'.

From March to April, the SMTH administration went to many negotiations with the University, expressing that they were willing to restore the SMTH to a pre-3/16 one and help do some reasonable adjustment on the regulation of BBS activities, which received from the University a response saying "we hope things would be under control". And it was said that the SMTH administration was then planning to move the valuable data of the SMTH BBS out of the campus onto a new site that would rival the on-campus one. However, the plan had not been officially claimed then.

On the morning of April 14, Chen Maoke, along with some guys from the NRCOTU, broke into the room that hosted the SMTH machine, from which they removed the cables connecting the data hard drive stand causing a breakdown of service. And they reconnected the hard drive stand to another machine where they had absolute root privileges to control everything. What they had done had ensured the data consistency but through a coup of administration.

In the afternoon, the SMTH administration announced that "Because SMTH is no longer under our control, we are not able to secure all users' data. And it is suggested that each of you see to it all on your own."

On April 15, the SMTH administration was temporarily dismissed. April 19, the members of the SMTH administration announced their resignations "due to a failure of the NRCOTU to truly and completely explain the event as a whole and its violation of the administrative regulations of the SMTH BBS". On April 20, the NRCOTU issued an announcement in return to deprive the sixteen SMTH administration members of their authority on SMTH.

On the same day, the smthbbs, a descendant of Firebird BBS, maintained by the SMTH BBS developing team, was announced to be renamed as K Board System, or KBS. And its Web features, the original work by the SMTH BBS developing team, was announced to have been under a non-GPLed, private license.

On May 2, the domain name smth.org was re-claimed by its owner. And since July, this domain name started to point at newsmth.net.

== Registration ==
Currently, there are only 2 types of users are allowed to open a new account. The users who provide their 11-digits cell phone number owns the rights of posting new content. The email users are not allowed to post any new items until their accounts are carefully reviewed by managers.

== See also ==
- YTHT
