= Zhidao (disambiguation) =

Zhidao is a product of the Chinese multinational technology company Baidu.

Zhidao may also refer to:

- Zhidao (至道; 995–997), era name of the Emperor Taizong of Song
- Qian Zhidao (钱志道; 1910–1989), Chinese chemist
- Senova Zhidao (智道), mid-size sedan produced by BAIC under the Senova sub-brand

== See also ==
- 知道 (disambiguation)
