= Internet censorship in China =

Internet censorship is one of the forms of censorship, the suppression of speech, public communication and other information. The People's Republic of China (PRC) censors both the publishing and viewing of online material. Many controversial events are censored from news coverage, preventing many Chinese citizens from knowing about the actions of their government, and severely restricting freedom of the press. China's censorship includes the complete blockage of various websites, apps, and video games, inspiring the policy's nickname, the Great Firewall, which blocks websites. Methods used to block websites and pages include DNS spoofing, blocking access to IP addresses, analyzing and filtering URLs, packet inspection, and resetting connections.

The government blocks website content and monitors Internet access. As required by the government, major Internet platforms in China have established elaborate self-censorship mechanisms. Internet platforms are required to implement a real-name system, requiring users' real names, ID numbers, and other information when providing services. As of 2019, more than sixty online restrictions had been created by the Chinese government and implemented by provincial branches of state-owned ISPs, companies and organizations. Some companies hire teams and invest in powerful artificial intelligence algorithms to police and remove illegal online content. VPNs are heavily restricted and unauthorized usage can be subject to fines and legal prosecution. VPN usage among the Chinese population is low; as of 2022, around 3% of Chinese citizens were estimated to use VPNs, while the Asia Society estimated in 2026 that VPN usage in China by percentage was in the low single digits. Due to the Great Firewall, China has one of the lowest cross-border internet traffic rates in the world. Usage of foreign apps and websites in China is extremely low, with most Chinese netizens using domestic alternatives.

Amnesty International states that China has "the largest recorded number of imprisoned journalists and cyber-dissidents in the world" and Reporters Without Borders stated in 2010 and 2012 that "China is the world's biggest prison for netizens." Freedom House rated China "Not Free" in the Freedom on the Net 2023 report. Commonly alleged user offenses include communicating with organized groups abroad, signing controversial online petitions, and forcibly calling for government reform. The government has escalated its efforts to reduce coverage and commentary that is critical of the regime after a series of large anti-pollution and anti-corruption protests. Many of these protests were organized or publicized using instant messaging services, chat rooms, and text messages. China's Internet police force was reported by official state media to be 2 million strong in 2013.

China's special administrative regions of Hong Kong and Macau are outside the Great Firewall. However, it was reported that the central government authorities have been closely monitoring Internet use in these regions (see Internet censorship in Hong Kong).

== Background ==
The political and ideological background of Internet censorship is considered to be one of Deng Xiaoping's favorite sayings in the early 1980s: "If you open a window for fresh air, you have to expect some flies to blow in." The saying is related to a period of the reform and opening up that became known as the socialist market economy. Superseding the political ideologies of the Cultural Revolution, the reform led China towards a market economy, opening it up to foreign investors. Nonetheless, the Chinese Communist Party (CCP) wished to protect its values and political ideas by "swatting flies" of other ideologies, with a particular emphasis on suppressing movements that could potentially threaten the stability of the country.

The Internet first arrived in the country in 1994. Since its arrival and the gradual rise of availability, the Internet has become a common communication platform and an important tool for sharing information. Just as the Chinese government had expected, the number of Internet users in China soared from less than one percent in 1994, when the Internet was introduced, to 28.8 percent by 2009.

In 1998, the CCP feared the China Democracy Party (CDP), organized in contravention of the Four Cardinal Principles, would breed a powerful new network that CCP party elites might not be able to control resulting in the CDP being immediately banned. That same year, the Golden Shield project was created. The first part of the project lasted eight years and was completed in 2006. The second part began in 2006 and ended in 2008. The Golden Shield project was a database project in which the government could access the records of each citizen and connect China's security organizations. The government had the power to delete any comments online that were considered harmful.

On 6 December 2002, 300 members in charge of the Golden Shield project came from 31 provinces and cities across China to participate in a four-day inaugural "Comprehensive Exhibition on Chinese Information System". At the exhibition, many Western technology products including Internet security, video monitoring, and facial recognition systems were purchased. According to Amnesty International, around 30,000–50,000 Internet police have been employed by the Chinese government to enforce Internet laws.

The Chinese government has described censorship as the method to prevent and eliminate "risks in the ideological field from the Internet".

== Legislative basis ==
A simplified topology of the Chinese firewall

The government of China defends its right to censor the Internet by claiming that this right extends from the country's own rules inside its borders. A white paper released in June 2010 reaffirmed the government's determination to govern the Internet within its borders under the jurisdiction of Chinese sovereignty. The document states, "Laws and regulations prohibit the spread of information that contains content subverting state power, undermining national unity [or] infringing upon national honor and interests." It adds that foreign individuals and firms can use the Internet in China, but they must abide by the country's laws.

The Central Government of China started its Internet censorship with three regulations. The first regulation was called the Temporary Regulation for the Management of Computer Information Network International Connection. The regulation was passed in the 42nd Standing Convention of the State Council on 23 January 1996. It was formally announced on 1 February 1996, and updated again on 20 May 1997. The content of the first regulation stated that Internet service providers be licensed and that Internet traffic goes through ChinaNet, GBNet, CERNET or CSTNET. The second regulation was the Ordinance for Security Protection of Computer Information Systems. It was issued on 18 February 1994 by the State Council to give the responsibility of Internet security protection to the Ministry of Public Security.

=== Article 5 of the Computer Information Network and Internet Security, Protection, and Management Regulations ===
The Ordinance regulation further led to the Security Management Procedures in Internet Accessing issued by the Ministry of Public Security in December 1997. The regulation defined "harmful information" and "harmful activities" regarding Internet usage. Section Five of the Computer Information Network and Internet Security, Protection, and Management Regulations approved by the State Council on 11 December 1997 stated the following:

Article 5: No unit or individual may use the Internet to create, replicate, retrieve, or transmit the following kinds of information:

(1) Inciting to resist or breaking the Constitution or laws or the implementation of administrative regulations;

(2) Inciting to overthrow the government or the socialist system;

(3) Inciting division of the country, harming national unification;

(4) Inciting hatred or discrimination among nationalities or harming the unity of the nationalities;

(5) Making falsehoods or distorting the truth, spreading rumors, destroying the order of society;

(6) Promoting feudal superstitions, sexually suggestive material, gambling, violence, murder,

(7) Terrorism or inciting others to criminal activity; openly insulting other people or distorting the truth to slander people;

(8) Injuring the reputation of state organs;

(9) Other activities against the Constitution, laws or administrative regulations.

— Computer Information Network and Internet Security, Protection and Management Regulations (Approved by the State Council on December 11, 1997 and promulgated by the Ministry of Public Security on December 30, 1997)

(The "units" stated above refer to work units (Chinese: 单位; pinyin: Dānwèi) or more broadly, workplaces). As of 2021, the regulations are still active and govern the activities of Internet users online.

=== Interim Regulations of the PRC on the Management of International Networking of Computer Information ===
In 1996, the Ministry of Commerce created a set of regulations which prohibit connection to "international networks" or use of channels outside of those provided by official government service providers without prior approval or license from authorities. The Ministry of Posts and Telecommunications has since been superseded by the Ministry of Industry and Information Technology or MIIT. To this date this regulation is still used to prosecute and fine users who connect to international networks or use VPNs.

Article 6: To carry out international networking of computer information, the output and input channels provided by the Ministry of Posts and Telecommunications in its public telecommunication network shall be used.

No units or individuals shall establish or use other channels for international networking on their own accord.

Article 14: Those that violate stipulations in articles 6, 8 and 10 shall be ordered by public security departments to stop networking, with a warning issued to them. They may also be imposed a fine below 15,000 yuan. If they have earned any illegal incomes, these incomes shall be confiscated.

— Interim Regulations of the PRC on the Management of International Networking of Computer Information (1996)

=== State Council Order No. 292 ===
In September 2000, State Council Order No. 292 created the first set of content restrictions for Internet content providers. China-based websites cannot link to overseas news websites or distribute news from overseas media without separate approval. Only "licensed print publishers" have the authority to deliver news online. These sites must obtain approval from state information offices and the State Council Information Agency. Non-licensed websites that wish to broadcast news may only publish information already released publicly by other news media. Article 11 of this order mentions that "content providers are responsible for ensuring the legality of any information disseminated through their services." Article 14 gives Government officials full access to any kind of sensitive information they wish from providers of Internet services.

=== Cybersecurity Law of the People's Republic of China ===
On 6 November 2017, the Standing Committee of the National People's Congress promulgated a cybersecurity law which among other things requires "network operators" to store data locally, hand over information when requested by state security organs and open software and hardware used by "critical information infrastructure" operators to be subject to national security review, potentially compromising source codes and security of encryption used by communications service providers. The law is an amalgamation of all previous regulations related to Internet use and online censorship and unifies and institutionalises the legislative framework governing cyber control and content censorship within the country. Article 12 states that persons using networks shall not "overturn the socialist system, incite separatism" or "break national unity" further institutionalising the suppression of dissent online.

Article 12: Any person and organization using networks shall abide by the Constitution and laws, observe public order, and respect social morality; they must not endanger cybersecurity, and must not use the Internet to engage in activities endangering national security, national honor, and national interests; they must not incite subversion of national sovereignty, overturn the socialist system, incite separatism, break national unity, advocate terrorism or extremism, advocate ethnic hatred and ethnic discrimination, disseminate violent, obscene, or sexual information, create or disseminate false information to disrupt the economic or social order, or information that infringes on the reputation, privacy, intellectual property or other lawful rights and interests of others, and other such acts.

— Cybersecurity Law of the People's Republic of China (2017), Chapter I.

=== Provisions on the Governance of the Online Information Content Ecosystem ===
On 20 December 2019, the Provisions on the Governance of the Online Information Content Ecosystem was promulgated by the Cyberspace Administration of China and took effect in March 2020. The Provisions require that online content creators "shall not" produce, copy or publish the following content:

- Opposing the basic principles established by the Constitution;
- Endangering national security, leaking state secrets, subverting state power, or undermining national unity;
- Damaging national honor and interests;
- Distorting, vilifying, blaspheming, or denying the deeds and spirit of heroes and martyrs, or insulting, slandering, or otherwise infringing upon the names, portraits, reputations, and honors of heroes and martyrs;
- Propagating terrorism, extremism, or inciting the commission of terrorist or extremist activities;
- Inciting ethnic hatred, ethnic discrimination, and undermining ethnic unity;
- Undermining the state's religious policies and promote evil cults and feudal superstitions;
- Spreading rumors and disrupting economic and social order;
- Spreading obscenity, pornography, gambling, violence, murder, terror, or inciting crime;
- Insulting or defaming others, infringing upon others' reputation, privacy, or other legitimate rights and interests;
- Other content prohibited by laws and administrative regulations.

The Provisions require content platforms to "prevent and resist" the following content:

- Using exaggerated titles, the content of which is seriously inconsistent with the title;
- Hype up gossip, scandal, bad deeds, etc.;
- Inappropriate comments on natural disasters, major accidents and other disasters;
- Containing sexual hints, sexual provocations, etc. that may easily cause people to have sexual associations;
- Content that is bloody, thrilling, cruel, or otherwise causes physical or mental discomfort;
- Inciting discrimination against groups of people, regions, etc.;
- Propagating vulgar, banal, and kitsch content;
- May cause minors to imitate unsafe behaviors and behaviors that violate social ethics, or induce minors to develop bad habits;
- Other content that has a negative impact on the network ecology.

The Provisions encourage online content creators to produce, copy and publish the following content:

- Publicize Xi Jinping Thought on Socialism with Chinese Characteristics for a New Era, and comprehensively, accurately and vividly interpret the path, theory, system and culture of socialism with Chinese characteristics;
- Publicizing the Party's theories, lines, principles, policies, and major decisions and arrangements of the Central Committee;
- Showing highlights of economic and social development and reflecting the great struggles and passionate lives of the people;
- Carry forward the core socialist values, publicize excellent moral culture and the spirit of the times, and fully demonstrate the high-spirited spirit of the Chinese nation;
- Effectively respond to social concerns, resolve doubts, analyze issues and help guide the masses to reach a consensus;
- It is helpful to enhance the international influence of Chinese culture and show the world a real, three-dimensional and comprehensive China;
- Other content talks about taste, style, responsibility, eulogizes truth, goodness and beauty, and promotes unity and stability.

=== Data Security Law of the People's Republic of China ===
On 10 June 2021, the Data Security Law was enacted and took effect on 1 September 2021. The law builds on the Cybersecurity Law and significantly extends China's extraterritorial jurisdiction of its current data regulations over new categories of data. It establishes new rules for businesses interacting with Chinese citizens, both inside and beyond China's borders, to follow.

Article 2 This Law shall apply to data processing activities and security supervision and regulation of such activities within the territory of the People's Republic of China. Where data processing outside the territory of People's Republic of China harms the national security, public interests, or the lawful rights and interests of individuals or organizations of the People's Republic of China, legal liability shall be investigated in accordance with the law.

— Data Security Law of the People's Republic of China (2021), Chapter I.

== Enforcement ==
In December 1997, the Ministry of Public Security released new regulations that levied fines for "defaming government agencies, splitting the nation, and leaking state secrets." Violators could face a fine of up to CNY 15,000 (roughly US$1,800). Banning appeared to be mostly uncoordinated and ad hoc, with some websites allowed in one city, yet similar sites blocked in another. The blocks were often lifted for special occasions. For example, The New York Times was unblocked when reporters in a private interview with CCP General Secretary Jiang Zemin specifically asked about the block and he replied that he would look into the matter. During the APEC summit in Shanghai during 2001, normally-blocked media sources such as CNN, NBC, and the Washington Post became accessible. Since 2001, blocks on Western media sites have been further relaxed, and all three of the sites previously mentioned were accessible from mainland China. However, access to the New York Times was denied again in December 2008.

In the middle of 2005, China purchased over 200 routers from an American company, Cisco Systems, which enabled the Chinese government to use more advanced censor technology. In February 2006, Google, in exchange for equipment installation on Chinese soil, blocked websites which the Chinese government deemed illegal. Google reversed this policy in 2010, after they suspected that a Google employee passed information to the Chinese government and inserted backdoors into their software.

In May 2011, the State Council Information Office announced the transfer of its offices which regulated the Internet to a new subordinate agency, the State Internet Information Office which would be responsible for regulating the Internet in China. The relationship of the new agency to other Internet regulation agencies in China was unclear from the announcement.

On 26 August 2014, the State Internet Information Office (SIIO) was formally authorized by the state council to regulate and supervise all Internet content. It later launched a website called the Cyberspace Administration of China (CAC) and the Office of the Central Leading Group for Cyberspace Affairs. In February 2014, the Central Internet Security and Informatization and the Deep State Leading Group was created in order to oversee cybersecurity and receive information from the CAC. Chairing the 2018 China Cyberspace Governance Conference on 20 and 21 April 2018, Xi Jinping, General Secretary of the Chinese Communist Party, committed to "fiercely crack down on criminal offenses including hacking, telecom fraud, and violation of citizens' privacy." The Conference comes on the eve of the First Digital China Summit, which was held at the Fuzhou Strait International Conference and Exhibition Centre in Fuzhou, the capital of Fujian Province.

On 4 January 2019, the CAC started a project to take down pornography, violence, bloody content, horror, gambling, defrauding, Internet rumors, superstition, invectives, parody, threats, and proliferation of "bad lifestyles" and "bad popular culture". On 10 January 2019, China Network Audiovisual Program Service Association announced a new regulation to censor short videos with controversial political or social content such as a "pessimistic outlook of millennials", "one night stands", "non-mainstream views of love and marriage" as well as previously prohibited content deemed politically sensitive.

China is planning to make deepfakes illegal which is described as the way to prevent "parody and pornography."

In July 2019, the CAC announced a regulation that said that Internet information providers and users in China who seriously violate related laws and regulations will be subject to Social Credit System blocklist. It also announces that Internet information providers and users who are not meeting the standard but mildly violation will be recorded in the List to Focus.

On 1 August 2022, the Regulations on the Administration of Internet User Account Information were issued by the China Internet Information Office came into effect, which requires Internet accounts to fill in their real occupations, and user IP location will be displayed, while registration of some accounts in professional fields is even required to provide verification materials.

During the 2022 COVID-19 protests in China, the CAC directed companies such as Tencent and ByteDance to intensify their censorship efforts.

After 15 December 2022, the Regulations on the Administration of Internet Followers' Commenting Services came into force, which for the first time considered "likes" as a type of comment. In addition, the regulations state that public accounts must take the initiative to review the comments left by netizens. Some experts have pointed out that this means that netizens may be punished by the platform or the authorities for the content of their likes.

=== Self-regulation ===
Internet censorship in China has been called "a panopticon that encourages self-censorship through the perception that users are being watched." On 16 March 2002, the Internet Society of China, a self-governing Chinese Internet industry body, launched the Public Pledge on Self-Discipline for the Chinese Internet Industry, an agreement between the Chinese Internet industry regulator and companies that operate sites in China. In signing the agreement, web companies pledge to identify and prevent the transmission of information that Chinese authorities deem objectionable, including information that "breaks laws or spreads superstition or obscenity", or that "may jeopardize state security and disrupt social stability". As of 2006, the pledge had been signed by more than 3,000 entities operating websites in China.

Internet platforms like Sina and QQ are not authorized to broadcast news or conduct interviews. In practice, such platforms do so with self-constraint, avoiding publicizing news which could run counter to the government. A 2008 poll showed that up to 85% of all Chinese approved their government regulating and partially censoring the Internet.

=== Use of service providers ===
Although the government does not have the physical resources to monitor all Internet chat rooms and forums, the threat of being shut down has caused Internet content providers to employ internal staff, colloquially known as "big mamas", who stop and remove forum comments which may be politically sensitive. In Shenzhen, these duties are partly taken over by a pair of police-created cartoon characters, Jingjing and Chacha, who help extend the online "police presence" of the Shenzhen authorities. These cartoons spread across the nation in 2007 reminding Internet users that they are being watched and should avoid posting "sensitive" or "harmful" material on the Internet.

However, Internet content providers have adopted some counter-strategies. One is to post politically sensitive stories and remove them only when the government complains. In the hours or days in which the story is available online, people read it, and by the time the story is taken down, the information is already public. One notable case in which this occurred was in response to a school explosion in 2001, when local officials tried to suppress the fact the explosion resulted from children illegally producing fireworks.

On 11 July 2003, the Chinese government started granting licenses to businesses to open Internet cafe chains. Business analysts and foreign Internet operators regard the licenses as intended to clamp down on information deemed harmful to the Chinese government. In July 2007, the city of Xiamen announced it would ban anonymous online postings after text messages and online communications were used to rally protests against a proposed chemical plant in the city. Internet users will be required to provide proof of identity when posting messages on the more than 100,000 Web sites registered in Xiamen. The Chinese government issued new rules on 28 December 2012, requiring Internet users to provide their real names to service providers, while assigning Internet companies greater responsibility for deleting forbidden postings and reporting them to the authorities. The new regulations, issued by the Standing Committee of the National People's Congress, allow Internet users to continue to adopt pseudonyms for their online postings, but only if they first provide their real names to service providers, a measure that could chill some of the vibrant discourse on the country's Twitter-like microblogs. The authorities periodically detain and even jail Internet users for politically sensitive comments, such as calls for a multiparty democracy or accusations of impropriety by local officials.

=== Arrests ===
Fines and short arrests are becoming an optional punishment to whoever spreads undesirable information through the different Internet formats, as this is seen as a risk to social stability.

In 2001, Wang Xiaoning and other Chinese activists were arrested and sentenced to 10 years in prison for using a Yahoo! email account to post anonymous writing to an Internet mailing list. On 23 July 2008, the family of Liu Shaokun was notified that he had been sentenced to one year re-education through labor for "inciting a disturbance". As a teacher in Sichuan province, he had taken photographs of collapsed schools and posted these photos online. On 18 July 2008, Huang Qi was formally arrested on suspicion of illegally possessing state secrets. Huang had spoken with the foreign press and posted information on his website about the plight of parents who had lost children in collapsed schools. Shi Tao, a Chinese journalist, used his Yahoo! email account to send a message to a U.S.-based pro-democracy website. In his email, he summarized a government order directing media organizations in China to downplay the upcoming 15th anniversary of the 1989 crackdown on pro-democracy activists. Police arrested him in November 2004, charging him with "illegally providing state secrets to foreign entities". In April 2005, he was sentenced to 10 years' imprisonment and two years' subsequent deprivation of his political rights.

In mid-2013 police across China arrested hundreds of people accused of spreading false rumors online. The arrest targeted microbloggers who accused CCP officials of corruption, venality, and sexual escapades. The crackdown was intended to disrupt online networks of like-minded people whose ideas could challenge the authority of the CCP. Some of China's most popular microbloggers were arrested. In September 2013, China's highest court and prosecution office issued guidelines that define and outline penalties for publishing online rumors and slander. The rules give some protection to citizens who accuse officials of corruption, but a slanderous message forwarded more than 500 times or read more than 5,000 times could result in up to three years in prison.

In 2017, a Uyghur university student at Xinjiang University, Mehmut Memtimin, was sentenced to 13 years in prison for using a VPN.

According to the 2020 World Press Freedom Index, compiled by Reporters Without Borders, China is the world's biggest jailer of journalists, holding around 100 in detention. In February 2020, China arrested two of its citizens for taking it upon themselves to cover the COVID-19 pandemic.

On 10 May 2021 blogger Ruan Xiaohuan was arrested by the Shanghai police. He was convicted of "inciting subversion of state power" for his blog, ProgramThink, which was critical of the regime. He was sentenced to seven years in prison in February 2023. His wife, Bei Zhenying, was apparently warned by authorities against discussing the case.

In September 2024, six activists were sentenced to between three and twelve years for "subverting state power" in connection with efforts to form an opposition party, which authorities claimed were carried out mostly online.

== Technical implementation ==
=== Current methods ===
The Great Firewall has used numerous methods to block content, including IP dropping, DNS spoofing, deep packet inspection for finding plain text signatures within the handshake to throttle protocols, and more recently active probing. Large language models are also used to detect dissent.

=== Golden shield project ===
The Golden Shield Project maintained and constructed by the Ministry of Public Security (MPS) of the People's Republic of China started in 1998, began processing in November 2003, and the first part of the project passed the national inspection on 16 November 2006 in Beijing. According to MPS, its purpose is to construct a communication network and computer information system for police to improve their capability and efficiency. By 2002, the preliminary work of the Golden Shield Project had cost "US$800 million (equivalent to RMB 6,400 million or €640 million)." Greg Walton, a freelance researcher, said that the aim of the Golden Shield is to establish a "gigantic online database" that would include "speech and face recognition, closed-circuit television... [and] credit records" as well as traditional Internet use records.

A notice issued by the Ministry of Industry and Information Technology on 19 May stated that, as of 1 July 2009, manufacturers must ship machines to be sold in mainland China with the Green Dam Youth Escort software. On 14 August 2009, Li Yizhong, minister of industry and information technology, announced that computer manufacturers and retailers were no longer obliged to ship the software with new computers for home or business use, but that schools, Internet cafes and other public use computers would still be required to run the software.

A senior official of the Internet Affairs Bureau of the State Council Information Office said the software's only purpose was "to filter pornography on the Internet". The general manager of Jinhui, which developed Green Dam, said: "Our software is simply not capable of spying on Internet users, it is only a filter." Human rights advocates in China have criticized the software for being "a thinly concealed attempt by the government to expand censorship". Online polls conducted on Sina, Netease, Tencent, Sohu, and Southern Metropolis Daily revealed over 70% rejection of the software by netizens. However, Xinhua commented that "support [for Green Dam] largely stems from end users, opposing opinions primarily come from a minority of media outlets and businesses."

Political scientist Margaret Roberts contends that most Chinese censorship methods do not ban information outright but instead function "as a tax on information, forcing users to pay money or spend more time if they want to access the censored material."

== Targets of censorship ==
=== Targeted content ===
According to a Harvard study, at least 18,000 websites were blocked from within mainland China in 2002, including 12 out of the Top 100 Global Websites. The Chinese-sponsored news agency, Xinhua, stated that censorship targets only "superstitious, pornographic, violence-related, gambling, and other harmful information." This appears questionable, as the e-mail provider Gmail is blocked, and it cannot be said to fall into any of these categories. On the other hand, websites centered on the following political topics are often censored: Falun Gong, police brutality, the 1989 Tiananmen Square protests and massacre, freedom of speech, democracy, the Tibetan independence movement, and the Tuidang movement. According to a 2023 report by Human Rights Watch, content that criticizes racism in China will often be censored.

Testing performed by Freedom House in 2011 confirmed that material written by or about activist bloggers is removed from the Chinese Internet in a practice that has been termed "cyber-disappearance".

A 2012 study of social media sites by other Harvard researchers found that 13% of Internet posts were blocked. The blocking focused mainly on any form of collective action (anything from false rumors driving riots to protest organizers to large parties for fun), pornography, and criticism of the censors. However, significant criticisms of the government were not blocked when made separately from calls for collective action. Another study has shown comments on social media that criticize the state, its leaders, and their policies are usually published, but posts with collective action potential will be more likely to be censored whether they are against the state or not.

A lot of larger Japanese websites were blocked from the afternoon of 15 June 2012 (UTC+08:00) to the morning of 17 June 2012 (UTC+08:00), such as Google Japan, Yahoo! Japan, Amazon Japan, Excite, Yomiuri News, Sponichi News and Nikkei BP Japan.

Chinese censors have been relatively reluctant to block websites where there might be significant economic consequences. For example, a block of GitHub was reversed after widespread complaints from the Chinese software developer community. In November 2013 after the Chinese services of Reuters and the Wall Street Journal were blocked, GreatFire mirrored the Reuters website to an Amazon.com domain in such a way that it could not be shut down without shutting off domestic access to all of Amazon's cloud storage service.

For one month beginning 17 November 2014, ProPublica tested whether the homepages of 18 international news organizations were accessible to browsers inside China, and found the most consistently blocked were Bloomberg News, The New York Times, South China Morning Post, The Wall Street Journal, Facebook, and Twitter. Internet censorship and surveillance has been tightly implemented in China that block social websites like Gmail, Google, YouTube, Facebook, Instagram, Twitter, and others. The censorship practices of the Great Firewall of China have now impacted the VPN service providers as well. In November 2024, despite being previously blocked, OnlyFans became available in mainland China, according to GreatFire.

==== Artificial intelligence ====
In 2023, in-country access was blocked to Hugging Face, a company that maintains libraries containing training data sets commonly used for large language models.

The Chinese government increasingly deploys AI for real-time content flagging, sentiment analysis, and predictive censorship on platforms such as ByteDance and Tencent. AI tools now monitor minority languages, including Uyghur and Tibetan, and are integrated into "smart courts" and predictive policing systems. Large language models like DeepSeek-R1 automatically censor prompts about Tibet or Uyghurs, often producing insecure or degraded code.

Due to the censorship of the Chinese Internet and Chinese state media, AI models trained on Chinese language data generally express views favorable to the Chinese Communist Party and Chinese government when speaking in Chinese.

=== Search engines ===
One part of the block is to filter the search results of certain terms on Chinese search engines such as Sogou, 360 Search and Baidu. Attempting to search for censored keywords in these Chinese search engines will yield few or no results.

In addition, a connection containing intensive censored terms may also be closed by The Great Firewall, and cannot be re-established for several minutes. This affects all network connections including HTTP and POP, but the reset is more likely to occur during searching. Before the search engines censored themselves, many search engines had been blocked.

=== Discussion forums ===
"For reason which everyone knows, and to suppress our extremely unharmonious thoughts, this site is voluntarily closed for technical maintenance between 3 and 6 June 2009..." Dusanben.com (translation)

Several Bulletin Board Systems in universities were closed down or restricted public access since 2004, including the SMTH BBS and the YTHT BBS.

In September 2007, some data centers were shut down indiscriminately for providing interactive features such as blogs and forums. CBS reports an estimate that half the interactive sites hosted in China were blocked.

Coinciding with the twentieth anniversary of the government suppression of the pro-democracy protests in Tiananmen Square, the government ordered Internet portals, forums and discussion groups to shut down their servers for maintenance between 3 and 6 June 2009. The day before the mass shut-down, Chinese users of Twitter, Hotmail and Flickr, among others, reported a widespread inability to access these services.

=== Social media ===
The censorship of individual social media posts in China usually occurs in two circumstances:

1. Corporations/government hire censors to read individual social media posts and manually take down posts that violate policy. (Although the government and media often use the microblogging service Sina Weibo to spread ideas and monitor corruption, it is also supervised and self-censored by 700 Sina censors. )

2. Posts that will be primarily auto-blocked based on keyword filters, and decide which ones to publish later.

In the second half of 2009, the social networking sites Facebook and Twitter were blocked, presumably because of containing social or political commentary (similar to LiveJournal in the above list). An example is the commentary on the July 2009 Ürümqi riots. Another reason suggested for the block is that activists can utilize them to organize themselves.

In 2010, Chinese human rights activist Liu Xiaobo became a forbidden topic in Chinese media due to his winning the 2010 Nobel Peace Prize. Keywords and images relating to the activist and his life were again blocked in July 2017, shortly after his death.

After the 2011 Wenzhou train collision, the government started emphasizing the danger in spreading 'false rumours' (yaoyan), making the permissive usage of Weibo and social networks a public debate.

In 2012, First Monday published an article on "political content censorship in social media, i.e., the active deletion of messages published by individuals." This academic study, which received extensive media coverage, accumulated a dataset of 56 million messages sent on Sina Weibo from June through September 2011, and statistically analyzed them three months later, finding 212,583 deletions out of 1.3 million sampled, more than 16 percent. The study revealed that censors quickly deleted words with politically controversial meanings (e.g., qingci 请辞 "asking someone to resign" referring to calls for Railway Minister Sheng Guangzu to resign after the Wenzhou train collision on 23 July 2011), and also that the rate of message deletion was regionally anomalous (compare censorship rates of 53% in Tibet and 52% in Qinghai with 12% in Beijing and 11.4% in Shanghai). In another study conducted by a research team led by political scientist Gary King, objectionable posts created by King's team on a social networking site were almost universally removed within 24 hours of their posting.

The comment areas of popular posts which mentioned Vladimir Putin on Sina Weibo were shut down during the 2017 G20 Hamburg summit in Germany. It is a rare example that a foreign leader is granted the safety from a popular judgment on the Chinese Internet, which usually only granted to the Chinese leaders. This move by the Chinese Government may be related to their close ties with Russia and Putin himself.

However, a study by American researchers of 13.2 billion Weibo blog posts over the period 2009–2013 found that many sensitive topics were discussed, including on ethnic conflict, political scandals, and protests.

==== WeChat ====
WeChat is the dominant social media and messaging app in China, and is also the most popular messaging application for most Chinese nationals staying overseas. Though subject to state rules which saw individual posts removed, Tech in Asia reported in 2013 that certain "restricted words" had been blocked on WeChat globally. A crackdown in March 2014 deleted dozens of WeChat accounts, some of which were independent news channels with hundreds of thousands of followers. CNN reported that the blocks were related to laws banning the spread of political "rumors".

The state-run Xinhua News Agency reported in July 2020 that the CAC would conduct an intensive three-month investigation and cleanup of 13 media platforms, including WeChat.

=== SSL protocols ===
In March 2020, China suddenly started blocking websites using the TLS (Transport Layer Security 1.3) and ESNI (Encrypted Server Name Indicator) for SSL certificates, since ESNI makes it difficult if not impossible to identify the name of a website based on the server name displayed in its SSL certificate. Since May 2015, Chinese Wikipedia has been blocked in mainland China. This was done after Wikipedia started to use HTTPS encryption, which made selective censorship more difficult (see also Wikimedia blockade in mainland China).

== Specific examples of Internet censorship ==
=== Tiananmen Square protests and massacre ===
The Chinese government censors Internet materials related to the 1989 Tiananmen Square protests and massacre. According to the government's white paper in 2010 on the subject of Internet in China, the government protects "the safe flow of internet information and actively guides people to manage websites under the law and use the internet in a wholesome and correct way". The government, therefore, prevents people on the Internet from "divulging state secrets, subverting state power and jeopardizing national unification; damaging state honor" and "disrupting social order and stability." Law-abiding Chinese websites such as Sina Weibo censors words related to the protests in its search engine. Sina Weibo is one of the largest Chinese microblogging services. As of October 2012, Weibo's censored words include "Tank Man." The government also censors words that have similar pronunciation or meaning to "4 June", the date that the government's violent crackdown occurred. "陆肆", for example, is an alternative to "六四" (4 June). The government forbids remembrances of the protests. Sina Weibo's search engine, for example, censors Hong Kong lyricist Thomas Chow's song called 自由花 or "The Flower of Freedom", since attendees of the Vindicate 4 June and Relay the Torch rally at Hong Kong's Victoria Park sing this song every year to commemorate the victims of the events.

The government's Internet censorship of such topics was especially strict during the 20th anniversary of the Tiananmen Square protests, which occurred in 2009. According to a Reporters Without Borders' article, searching photos related to the protest such as "4 June" on Baidu, the most popular Chinese search engine, would return blank results and a message stating that the "search does not comply with laws, regulations, and policies". Moreover, a large number of netizens from China claimed that they were unable to access numerous Western web services such as Twitter, Hotmail, and Flickr in the days leading up to and during the anniversary. Netizens in China claimed that many Chinese web services were temporarily blocked days before and during the anniversary. Netizens also reported that microblogging services including Fanfou and Xiaonei (now known as Renren) were down with similar messages that claim that their services were "under maintenance" for a few days around the anniversary date.

In 2019, censors once again doubled down during the 30th anniversary of the protests, and by this time had been "largely automated" with AI rejecting protest-related posts. In May and June 2023, authorities censored Tiananmen protest-related posts and restricted communications of Tiananmen victims' families. In March 2024, censors removed social media posts containing photos of medals awarded to PLA soldiers who participated in the 1989 Tiananmen Square massacre.

==== Reactions of netizens in China ====
In 2009, the Guardian wrote that Chinese netizens responded with subtle protests against the government's temporary blockages of large web services. For instance, Chinese websites made subtle grievances against the state's censorship by sarcastically calling the date 4 June as the "Chinese Internet Maintenance Day". Owner of the blog Wuqing.org stated, "I, too, am under maintenance". The dictionary website Wordku.com voluntarily took its site down with the claim that this was because of the "Chinese Internet Maintenance Day". In 2013, Chinese netizens used subtle and sarcastic Internet memes to criticize the government and to bypass censorship by creating and posting humorous pictures or drawings resembling the Tank Man photo on Weibo. One of these pictures, for example, showed Florentijin Hofman's rubber ducks sculptures replacing tanks in the Tank Man photo. On Twitter, Hu Jia, a Beijing-based AIDS activist, asked netizens in mainland China to wear black T-shirts on 4 June to oppose censorship and to commemorate the date. Chinese web services such as Weibo eventually censored searches of both "black shirt" and "Big Yellow Duck" in 2013.

As a result, the government further promoted anti-western sentiment. In 2014, Chinese Communist Party general secretary Xi Jinping praised blogger Zhou Xiaoping for his "positive energy" after the latter argued in an essay titled "Nine Knockout Blows in America's Cold War Against China", that American culture was "eroding the moral foundation and self-confidence of the Chinese people."

==== Debates about the significance of Internet resistance to censorship ====
According to Chinese studies expert Johan Lagerkvist, scholars Pierre Bourdieu and Michel de Certeau argue that this culture of satire is a weapon of resistance against authority. This is because criticism against authority often results in satirical parodies that "presupposes and confirms emancipation" of the supposedly oppressed people. Academic writer Linda Hutcheon argues that some people, however, may view satirical language that is used to criticise the government as "complicity", which can "reinforce rather than subvert conservative attitudes". Chinese experts Perry Link and Xiao Qiang, however, oppose this argument. They claim that when sarcastic terms develop into common vocabulary of netizens, these terms would lose their sarcastic characteristic. They then become normal terms that carry significant political meanings that oppose the government. Xiao believes that the netizens' freedom to spread information on the Internet has forced the government to listen to popular demands of netizens. For example, the Ministry of Information Technology's plan to preinstall mandatory censoring software called Green Dam Youth Escort on computers failed after popular online opposition against it in 2009, the year of the 20th anniversary of the protest.

Lagerkvist states that the Chinese government, however, does not see subtle criticisms on the Internet as real threats that carry significant political meanings and topple the government. He argues that real threats occur only when "laugh mobs" become "organised smart mobs" that directly challenge the government's power. At a TED conference, Michael Anti gives a similar reason for the government's lack of enforcement against these Internet memes. Anti suggests that the government sometimes allows limited windows of freedom of speech such as Internet memes. Anti explains that this is to guide and generate public opinions that favor the government and to criticize enemies of the party officials.

==== Internet censorship of the protest in 2013 ====
The Chinese government has become more efficient in its Internet regulations since the 20th anniversary of the 1989 Tiananmen Square protests and massacre. On 3 June 2013, Sina Weibo quietly suspended usage of the candle icon from the comment input tool, which netizens used to mourn the dead on forums. Some searches related to the protest on Chinese website services no longer come up with blank results, but with results that the government had "carefully selected." These subtle methods of government censorship may cause netizens to believe that their searched materials were not censored.

=== Usage of Internet kill switch ===
China completely shut down Internet service in the autonomous region of Xinjiang from July 2009 to May 2010 for up to 312 days after the July 2009 Ürümqi riots.

=== COVID-19 pandemic ===
Reporters without Borders has accused that China's policies prevented an earlier warning about the COVID-19 pandemic. At least one doctor suspected as early as 25 December 2019 that an outbreak was occurring, but arguably may have been deterred from informing the media due to harsh punishment for whistleblowers.

During the pandemic, academic research concerning the origins of the virus was censored. An investigation by ProPublica and The New York Times found that the Cyberspace Administration of China placed censorship restrictions on Chinese media outlets and social media to avoid mentions of the COVID-19 outbreak, mentions of Li Wenliang, and "activated legions of fake online commenters to flood social sites with distracting chatter". Wuhan's public security bureau initially deemed Chinese doctor Li Wenliang's WeChat private group chat messages about SARS-CoV-2 as "rumors", leading to summons and admonitions against Li, which were later revoked.

In late 2022, demonstrations erupted across China against the Zero-COVID measures and various other issues. The catalyst for these protests was a fire in an Ürümqi apartment, which claimed 10 lives in November, during a persistent COVID-19 lockdown. In response, authorities acted to eliminate digital discussions regarding the protests. This included deleting posts, imposing limits on search capabilities, and erasing calls for the freeing of detained demonstrators. The Cyberspace Administration of China mandated that digital platforms increase their content moderation teams to erase any mentions of tools that might allow users to bypass censorship, aiming to cut off any pathways to openly discussing the protests through unfiltered internet channels. Following these events, the government lifted restrictions associated with COVID-19, leading to a surge in infection rates and fatalities. Sina Weibo, a major social media platform, blocked search results related to the "pandemic in Beijing" and prevented live conversations about the consequences of lifting lockdown measures. In January 2023, the authorities initiated a digital clampdown to eliminate "gloomy sentiments" fueled by what they termed as false information concerning the pandemic, and any digital content mentioning infection rates or fatalities was promptly deleted.

=== Accidents and mass attacks ===
Information regarding major accidents and mass attacks have increasingly been censored under the general secretaryship of Xi Jinping.

=== Other examples ===
In 2006, the government censored what it viewed as excessive anti-Japanese sentiment online related to the Diaoyu/Senkaku Islands dispute. Following the 2010 boat collision in the disputed islands, the Chinese government censored related keywords online and shut down internet chatrooms addressing the issues in an effort to decrease bilateral tension between the two countries.

A meme comparing Xi Jinping and Winnie the Pooh became the most censored image of 2015.

Since 2013, pictures comparing Disney character Winnie the Pooh to Xi Jinping have been systematically removed on the Chinese Internet following the spread of an Internet meme in which photographs of Xi and other individuals were compared to the bear and other characters from the works of A. A. Milne as re-imagined by Disney. The first heavily censored viral meme can be traced back to the official visit to the United States in 2013 during which Xi was photographed by a Reuters photographer walking with then-U.S. president Barack Obama in Sunnylands, California. A blog post where the photograph was juxtaposed with the cartoon depiction went viral, but Chinese censors rapidly deleted it. When Xi Jinping inspected troops through his limousine's sunroof, a popular meme was created with Winnie the Pooh in a toy car. The widely circulated image became the most censored picture of the year in 2015. Non-satirical images of the Pooh character are readily found on the internet, and Pooh merchandise, books, and theme park rides are not censored.

In February 2018, Xi Jinping appeared to set in motion a process to scrap term limits, allowing himself to become ruler for life. To suppress criticism, censors banned phrases such as Disagree (不同意), Shameless (不要脸), Lifelong (终身), Animal Farm, and at one point briefly censored the letter 'N'. Li Datong, a former state newspaper editor, wrote a critical letter that was censored; some social media users evaded the censorship by posting an upside-down screenshot of the letter.

Searches for "journalist in blue" were blocked after a reporter's eye-roll went viral in 2018.

On 13 March 2018, China's CCTV incidentally showed Yicai's Liang Xiangyi apparently rolling her eyes in disgust at a long-winded and canned media question during the widely watched National People's Congress. In the aftermath, Liang's name became the most-censored search term on Weibo. The government also blocked the search query "journalist in blue" and attempted to censor popular memes inspired by the eye-roll.

On 21 June 2018, British-born comedian John Oliver criticized China's paramount leader Xi Jinping on his U.S. show Last Week Tonight over Xi Jinping's apparent descent into authoritarianism (including his sidelining of dissent, human rights abuses against Uyghur peoples, and clampdowns on Chinese Internet censorship), as well as the Belt and Road Initiative. As a result, the English language name of John Oliver (although not the Chinese version) was censored on Sina Weibo and other sites on the Chinese Internet.

The American television show South Park was banned from China in 2019 and any mention of it was removed from almost all sites on the Chinese Internet, after criticizing China's government and censorship in season 23 episode, Band in China. Series creators Trey Parker and Matt Stone later issued a mock apology.

In 2019, large numbers of young online activists nicknamed the "fan girls" used VPNs to access Instagram, Facebook, and Twitter to propagate nationalist sentiment in opposition to the 2019-2020 Hong Kong protests and China's foreign critics. Authorities ultimately sought to restrict their online presence.

On 20 April 2020, Scratch was completely banned in China because of the community website's recognition of Macau, Hong Kong and Taiwan as countries.

In October 2022, in the run-up to the 20th National Congress of the Chinese Communist Party, photographs and videos of the Beijing Sitong Bridge protest were censored.

In January 2024, past articles concerning China's economic development from the People's Daily were censored.

Discussion of doping cases involving Chinese athletes in international sports is widely censored. Online discussion of the 2025 Bangkok skyscraper collapse was censored. In February 2026, CAC mandated that social media platforms censor content deemed as spreading "fear of marriage" or "anxiety about childbirth." In July 2026, an incident involving the killing of stray dog and her puppies was widely publicized outside of China but censored in the country amid calls for an expansion of laws against animal cruelty.

== International influence ==
Foreign content providers such as Yahoo!, AOL, and Microsoft Teams must abide by Chinese government wishes, including having internal content monitors, to be able to operate within mainland China. Also, per mainland Chinese laws, Microsoft began to censor the content of its blog service Windows Live Spaces, arguing that continuing to provide Internet services is more beneficial to the Chinese. Chinese journalist Michael Anti's blog on Windows Live Spaces was censored by Microsoft. In an April 2006 e-mail panel discussion Rebecca MacKinnon, who reported from China for nine years as a Beijing bureau chief for CNN, said: "... many bloggers said [Anti] was a necessary sacrifice so that the majority of Chinese can continue to have an online space to express themselves as they choose. So the point is, compromises are being made at every level of society because nobody expects political freedom anyway."

The Chinese version of Myspace, launched in April 2007, has many censorship-related differences from other international versions of the service. Discussion forums on topics such as religion and politics are absent and a filtering system that prevents the posting of content about politically sensitive topics has been added. Users are also given the ability to report the "misconduct" of other users for offenses including "endangering national security, leaking state secrets, subverting the government, undermining national unity, spreading rumors or disturbing the social order."

Some media have suggested that China's Internet censorship of foreign websites may also be a means of forcing mainland Chinese users to rely on China's e-commerce industry, thus self-insulating their economy from the dominance of international corporations. On 7 November 2005 an alliance of investors and researchers representing 26 companies in the U.S., Europe and Australia with over US$21 billion in joint assets announced that they were urging businesses to protect freedom of expression and pledged to monitor technology companies that do business in countries violating human rights, such as China. On 21 December 2005 the UN, OSCE and OAS special mandates on freedom of expression called on Internet corporations to "work together ... to resist official attempts to control or restrict the use of the Internet." Google finally responded when attacked by hackers rumored to be hired by the Chinese government by threatening to pull out of China.

In 2006, Reporters Without Borders wrote that it suspects that regimes such as Cuba, Zimbabwe, and Belarus have obtained surveillance technology from China.

=== Digital Silk Road ===
The Digital Silk Road has been described as a pathway to export China's system of mass surveillance and censorship technology of the Great Firewall to multiple countries.

=== Chinese social media platforms ===
With the proliferation of Chinese social media platforms such as TikTok, WeChat, QQ, Weibo and Xiaohongshu (RED) abroad, concerns have been raised about data harvesting by Chinese technology firms since such companies are registered in China and therefore fall under the jurisdiction of Chinese law, requiring access to data without warrant when requested by Chinese intelligence and public security authorities. Concern has also grown about the spread of Chinese language disinformation and propaganda on platforms targeted at overseas Chinese diaspora communities and the potential to sow discord and unrest towards host nation states and societies in addition to the exporting of Chinese censorship practices abroad, preventing the exercise of free speech by Chinese communities even when physically outside China.

== Evasion ==
=== Using a VPN service ===
Internet censorship in China is circumvented by determined parties by using proxy servers outside the firewall. Users may circumvent all of the censorship and monitoring of the Great Firewall if they have a working VPN or SSH connection method to a computer outside mainland China. However, disruptions of VPN services have been reported and the free or popular services especially are increasingly being blocked. Although China restricts VPNs, they remain used by private individuals. State-owned enterprises or state institutions also use VPNs for official work. The Chinese government has authorized several official licensed VPN providers who comply with Chinese censorship and backdoor access laws. Those who develop or sell their own VPNs potentially face years in prison. According to a 2022 estimate, 3% of Chinese netizens use VPNs, compared to 8.5% of Americans. Similarly, based on its estimates of leaked government documents, Asia Society estimated in 2026 that despite popular perceptions that VPNs are widely used in China, VPN demand in China was in the low single digits. It also estimated that foreign apps blocked by the Great Firewall have extremely low traffic, particularly compared to domestic apps; the top five domestic apps saw traffic that was 1,000 times more than the top five foreign apps. It concluded that only a tiny subset of the population tried to use banned foreign apps, and an even smaller percentage was successful in connecting to those apps, with most being unsuccessful.

In 2017, Apple started removing all VPN apps from Apple app stores at the behest of the Chinese government. Beginning in 2018, the Ministry of Industry and Information Technology (MIIT) in conjunction with the Cyberspace Administration Commission (CAC) began a sweeping crackdown on all VPN providers, ordering all major state owned telecommunications providers including China Telecom, China Mobile and China Unicom to block VPN protocols with only authorized users who have obtained permits beforehand to access VPNs (provided they are operated by state-owned telecommunications companies). Increased government crackdowns on VPNs have reduced their overall speeds, according to GreatFire. During the 2022 COVID-19 protests in China, the Chinese government intensified crackdowns on VPNs. To avoid deep packet inspection and continue providing services in China some VPN providers implemented server obfuscation.

In 2021, the Cyberspace Administration of China proposed new rules that would punish individuals and institutions for helping internet users bypass the 'Great Firewall', further attempting to restrict VPN usage. However, such article did not appear on the final version of the law published in September 2024. In practice, access to VPNs is limited for most mobile internet users as all apps provided in app stores require pre-approval from the Ministry of Industry and Information Technology since 2023.

Under the current, unamended law, VPN providers can be prosecuted in China under Supreme Court Guidelines on computer crimes. Providing a type of VPN in a way that severely disrupts the telecommunications market constitutes the offense of unlawful business operations.

=== Changing IP addresses ===
Blogs hosted on services such as Blogger and Wordpress.com are frequently blocked. In response, some China-focused services explicitly offer to change a blog's IP address within 30 minutes if it is blocked by the authorities.

=== Using a mirror website ===
In 2002, Chinese citizens used the Google mirror elgooG after China blocked Google. This has since been blocked.

=== Modifying the network stack ===
In July 2006, researchers at Cambridge University claimed to have defeated the firewall by ignoring the TCP reset packets.

=== Using Tor and DPI-resistant tools ===
Although many users use VPNs to circumvent the Great Firewall of China, many Internet connections are now subject to deep packet inspection, in which data packets are looked at in detail. Many VPNs have been blocked using this method. Blogger Grey One suggests users trying to disguise VPN usage forward their VPN traffic through port 443 because this port is also heavily used by web browsers for HTTPS connections. However, Grey points out this method is futile against advanced inspection. Obfsproxy and other pluggable transports do allow users to evade deep-packet inspection.

The Tor anonymity network was and is subject to partial blocking by China's Great Firewall. The Tor website is blocked when accessed over HTTP but it is reachable over HTTPS so it is possible for users to download the Tor Browser Bundle. The Tor project also maintains a list of website mirrors in case the main Tor website is blocked.

The Tor network maintains a public list of approximately 3000 entry relays; almost all of them are blocked. In addition to the public relays, Tor maintains bridges which are non-public relays. Their purpose is to help censored users reach the Tor network. The Great Firewall scrapes nearly all the bridge IPs distributed through bridges.torproject.org and email. According to Winter's research paper published in April 2012, this blocking technique can be circumvented by using packet fragmentation or the Tor obfsproxy bundle in combination with private obfsproxy bridges. Tor Obfs4 bridges still work in China as long as the IPs are discovered through social networks or self-published bridges.

Tor now primarily functions in China using Snowflake and meeks which works via front-end proxies hosted on Content Delivery Networks (CDNs) to obfuscate the information coming to and from the source and destination, it is a type of pluggable transport. Examples are Microsoft's Azure and Cloudflare.

=== Unintended methods ===
It was common in the past to use Google's cache feature to view blocked websites. However, this feature of Google seems to be under some level of blocking, as access is now erratic and does not work for blocked websites. Currently, the block is mostly circumvented by using proxy servers outside the firewall and is not difficult to carry out for those determined to do so.

The mobile Opera Mini browser uses a proxy-based approach employing encryption and compression to speed up downloads. This has the side effect of allowing it to circumvent several approaches to Internet censorship. In 2009 this led the government of China to ban all but a special Chinese version of the browser.

=== Using an analogy to bypass keyword filters ===
One technique in expressing views to avoid online censorship is the practice of dacabianqiu ("playing the edge ball"), in which users convey a point of view deemed as controversial by avoiding the use of a politically sensitive term.

As the Great Firewall of China gets more sophisticated, users are getting increasingly creative in the ways they elude the censorship, such as by using analogies to discuss topics. Furthermore, users are becoming increasingly open in their mockery of them by actively using homophones to avoid censorship. Deleted sites have "been harmonized", indicating CCP general secretary Hu Jintao's Internet censorship lies under the larger idea of creating a "Socialist Harmonious Society". For example, censors are referred to as "river crabs" (河蟹), because in Chinese that phrase forms a homophone for "harmony" (和谐).

=== Using steganography ===
According to The Guardian editor Charles Arthur, Internet users in China have found more technical ways to get around the Great Firewall of China, including using steganography, a practice of "embedding useful data in what looks like something irrelevant. The text of a document can be broken into its constituent bytes, which are added to the pixels of an innocent picture. The effect is barely visible on the picture, but the recipient can extract it with the right software".

=== Voices ===
Rupert Murdoch famously proclaimed that advances in communications technology posed an "unambiguous threat to totalitarian regimes everywhere" and Ai Weiwei argued that the Chinese "leaders must understand it's not possible for them to control the Internet unless they shut it off".

However, Nathan Freitas, a fellow at the Berkman Center for Internet and Society at Harvard and technical adviser to the Tibet Action Institute, says "There's a growing sense within China that widely used VPN services that were once considered untouchable are now being touched." In June 2015 Jaime Blasco, a security researcher at AlienVault in Silicon Valley, reported that hackers, possibly with the assistance of the Chinese government, had found ways to circumvent the most popular privacy tools on the Internet: virtual private networks, or VPNs, and Tor. This is done with the aid of a particularly serious vulnerability, known as JSONP, that 15 web services in China never patched. As long as the users are logged into one of China's top web services such as Baidu, QQ, Taobao, Sina, Sohu, and Ctrip the hackers can identify them and access their personal information, even if they are using Tor or a VPN. The vulnerability is not new; it was published in a Chinese security and web forum around 2013.

=== Specific examples of evasion as Internet activism ===
The rapid increase of access to Internet in China has also created new opportunities for Internet activism. For example, in terms of journalism, Marina Svensson's article on "Media and Civil Society in China: Community building and networking among investigative journalists and beyond" illustrates that although Chinese journalists are not able to create their own private companies, they are using informal connections online and offline that allows them to create a community that may allow them to go around state repression. Specifically, with the development of microblogging, an increase in new community that are formed underlines a possibility of "...more open expressions of solidarity and ironic resistance". However, one shortcoming with Internet activism is digital inequality.

A 2022 study analysed memes of Kim Jong-un by Chinese social media users. Results have shown how the public can express political opinions, even in a high-censorship environment.

== Economic impact ==
According to the BBC, local Chinese businesses such as Baidu, Tencent and Alibaba, some of the world's largest Internet enterprises, benefited from the way China has blocked international rivals from the market, encouraging domestic competition.

According to Financial Times, China's crackdown on VPN portals has brought business to state-approved telecom companies. Reuters reported that China's state newspaper has expanded its online censoring business. The company's net income in 2018 has risen 140 percent. Its Shanghai-listed stock price jumped up by 166 percent in 2018.

Table of examples of Chinese equivalents to Western Internet services
International service (blocked in China)	Chinese equivalent or international equivalent operating in China
WhatsApp	WeChat
WhatsApp	QQ
WhatsApp	iMessage
WhatsApp	FaceTime
Twitter	Sina Weibo
Twitter	other weibos
Google	Baidu
Google	Google China
Google	Bing
Google	Sogou
Gmail	QQ Mail
Gmail	126 and 163 (NetEase)
Gmail	iCloud Mail (operated by GCBD in mainland China)
Gmail	Outlook.com
Google Drive	Baidu Wangpan
Google Drive	iCloud Drive (operated by GCBD in mainland China)
Google Drive	OneDrive
Google Docs	Tencent Wendang
Google Docs	Microsoft Word
Google Docs	LibreOffice Writer
Google Docs	Apple Pages
Google Meet	Microsoft Teams
Google Meet	FaceTime
Google Meet	DingTalk
Google Meet	Tencent Meeting
Facebook	Qzone
Facebook	Renren
YouTube	Tencent Video
YouTube	bilibili
YouTube	Youku
eBay	JD.com
eBay	Taobao
Reddit	Baidu Tieba
Wikipedia	Baidu Baike
Wikipedia	Sogou Baike
Wikipedia	Baike.com
Netflix	IQIYI
Quora	Zhihu
Spotify	QQ Music
Spotify	NetEase Music
Spotify	Kugou
Spotify	Apple Music
Instagram	WeChat
Instagram	Xiaohongshu
TikTok	Douyin
TikTok	Kuaishou
GitHub	Gitee
Google Play Store	Tencent Yingyongbao
Google Play Store	Huawei AppGallery
Google Play Store	Other domestic Android app stores
Google Play Store	Direct download of APK from developer website

== See also ==
- Internet censorship
- List of websites blocked in mainland China
- Censorship in China
- Digital divide in China
- Human rights in China
- Internet real-name system in China
- Media of China
- Censorship of GitHub in China
- Internet censorship circumvention
