= Mobile phone real-name system in China =

Chinese mobile phone registration policy

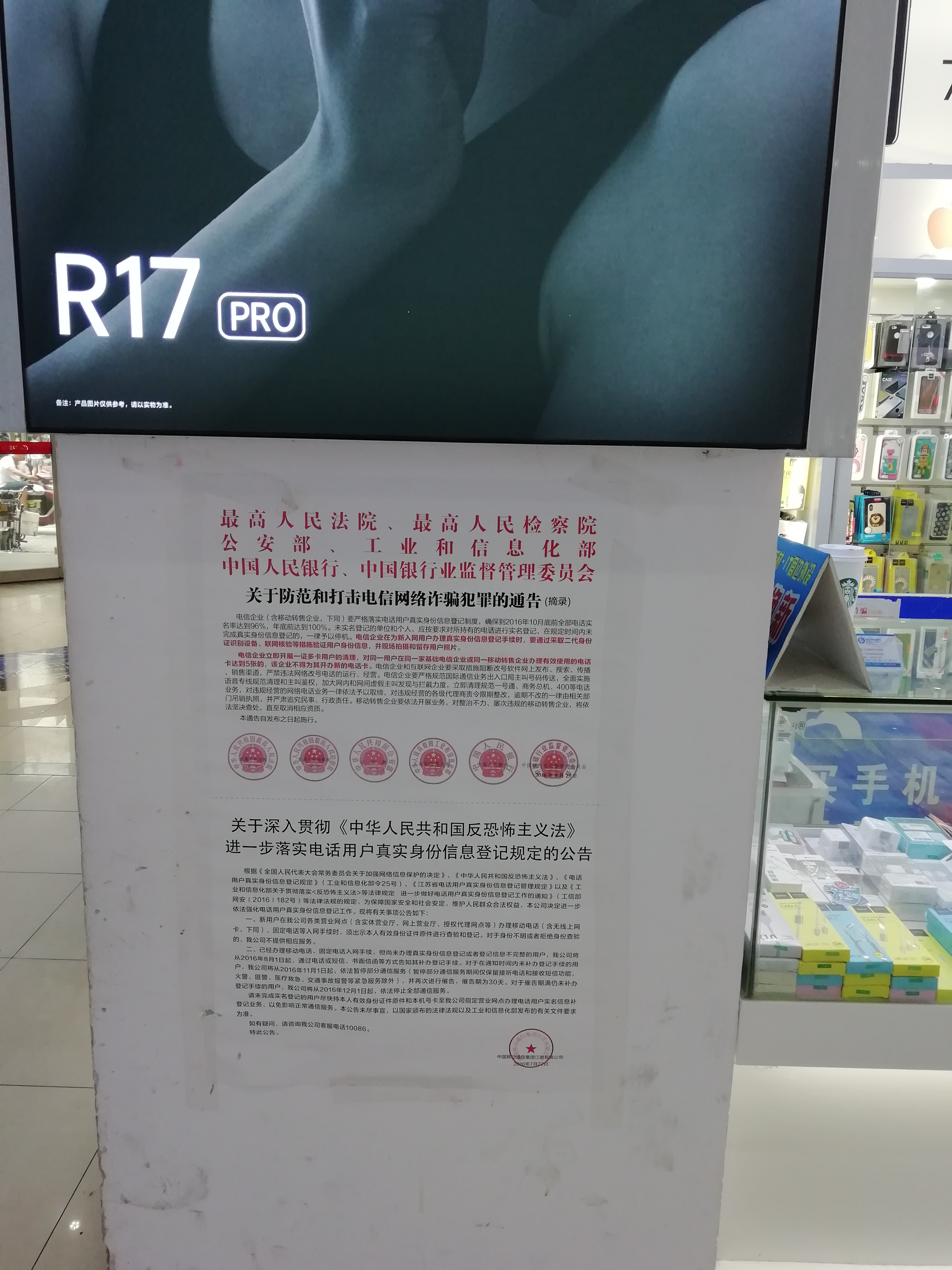
A notice on the implementation of the mobile phone real-name system posted in a shopping mall in Suzhou

The mobile phone real-name registration system is a regulation in the People's Republic of China that requires users to register their mobile phones with their real names. It was officially implemented on September 1, 2010, and requires users to provide their personal information to register with their real names. The Chinese government said that this measure was intended to combat the proliferation of harmful information such as telephone fraud and spam text messages. Senior Beijing official Deng Zhonghua says Hong Kong’s real-name SIM card registration will safeguard national security.

== History ==
Since 2010, new users must register with their real names when purchasing prepaid or postpaid mobile phone cards, and existing users must complete the registration procedures within two to three years. Many newsstands and roadside shops have received urgent notices, requiring them to temporarily stop selling all types of mobile phone cards until they have received specific registration procedures and relevant training. As of the end of June 2010, the number of mobile phone users in China has exceeded 800 million, of which more than 320 million have not registered with their real names.

Since the Ministry of Industry and Information Technology (MIIT), the competent authority in China, had not yet announced a unified national mobile phone real-name system management method at that time, the implementation effect of the mobile phone real-name system was not ideal. Later, the Standing Committee of the National People's Congress and the MIIT issued the "Decision on Strengthening Network Information Protection", "Regulations on the Protection of Personal Information of Telecommunications and Internet Users" and "Regulations on the Registration of Real Identity Information of Telephone Users", requiring mobile phone users to register with real names, but only for new network users, so there were not many requirements for users who did not register with real names. In addition, there were problems such as lax real-name registration of online channels, prominent violations of resale companies, and slow progress in the registration of old users who did not register with real names during the implementation process, so the real-name rate has always been relatively low.

On September 1, 2013, the "Regulations on the Registration of Real Identity Information of Telephone Users" was officially implemented, stipulating that new mobile phone users must register their real identity information. In 2014, the MIIT, the Ministry of Public Security, and the State Administration for Industry and Commerce jointly announced the "Special Action Plan for the Governance of Telephone "Black Cards", requiring that from 2015, mobile phone cards must be purchased with valid identity documents, and jointly carry out a one-year special governance action across the country. According to statistics from the MIIT, as of February 2014, the real-name registration rate for new telephone users in mainland China reached 99.1%, and the real-name registration rate for all telephone users reached 82.4%.

In September 2015, the MIIT again required telecom operators to ensure that the real-name registration rate of all users reached 90% or more by the end of the year. In May 2016, the required rate was increased to 95% or more. Operators were also required to notify users who had not registered their real names to complete the registration procedures through phone calls, text messages, written letters, announcements, etc. Operators will suspend communication services for users who have not completed the registration procedures and urge them to register. If users still fail to register their real names after being urged, operators will shut down their services. By June 30, 2017, all users must complete real-name registration.

On November 7, 2016, the MIIT issued the "Implementation Opinions on Further Preventing and Combating Telecommunication Information Fraud", which stated that the real-name system for telephone users will be strictly and quickly implemented. All operators must achieve a 100% real-name rate by the end of 2016. All mobile resale companies must conduct follow-up visits and identity information confirmation for all users of the 170 and 171 number segments, and re-register users who have not registered or whose registration information is incorrect. The real-name rate must reach 100% by the end of 2016. Those who fail to complete the re-registration within the specified time will have their service suspended. According to information released by the MIIT in 2017, in 2016, the MIIT organized a total of 120 million telephone users to complete real-name re-registration. At this point, all telephone users have achieved real-name registration.

In September 2021, the China Academy of Information and Communications Technology launched a mini-app called "National Mobile Phone Card One-Card Check". Users can enter their name, Resident Identity Card number and a verification code to see the number of mobile phone cards registered in their name. The results will be sent to them via text message.

=== Issues with virtual operators ===
Due to negligence in supervision, some virtual operators' number segments (170, 171) have allowed many fraudsters to anonymously purchase mobile phone cards with these numbers. In his comment on Wang Xing's disappearance, Hu Xijin, former editor-in-chief of the Global Times, pointed out that despite China's strict implementation of the real-name system for mobile phones, Myanmar's telecommunications network fraud groups were still able to smuggle SIM cards out of the country, pass registration and authentication, and eventually flow into China's domestic communications network, using virtual numbers to hide. He believes that China Mobile and other communications operators must make a public response to this. As early as April 2016, the MIIT required virtual operators to complete the user identity information re-registration work for users who had not registered their real names or had falsely registered within one month.

== Hong Kong ==
Senior Beijing official Deng Zhonghua says Hong Kong’s real-name SIM card registration will safeguard national security. Hong Kong phone scams triple since real-name SIM card registration required.

== See also ==
- Internet real-name system in China
