= YTHT =

Chinese bulletin board system

Yi Ta Hu Tu (Chinese: 一塌糊涂BBS; YTHT BBS) is a bulletin board system which was created on September 17, 1999, by student Lepton (Wu Tao) in Peking University, Beijing, China. Prior to being blocked by the government, it was one of the largest BBS communities in China, with more than 300,000 registered users.

== Name ==
In Chinese, Yi Ta Hu Tu (一塌糊涂) means "extremely messy" literally. However, the name is a pun; Ta, Hu, and Tu also mean "tower", "lake", and "picture" (图) respectively, and are used to refer to three landmarks inside Peking University: the Boya Tower (博雅塔), Weiming Lake (未名湖), and the Peking University Library (图书馆, tu-shu-guan, with tu as its first character). Yi means "one". The name thus reads as a homophone of "一塔湖图" (yi ta hu tu, "one tower, lake, library").

== History ==
=== Founding and growth ===
YTHT was set up by Lepton, a graduate student at the physics department of Peking University, on September 17, 1999, serving mainly as a communication platform for PKU students. Since the former PKU bulletin board system, the Unknown Space, had been forced to close under government censorship, PKU had not maintained an independent BBS for an extended period. When YTHT launched, it quickly attracted PKU students. Despite the university later launching its official BBS (Wei Ming station), YTHT grew into one of the largest BBS systems on the China Education and Research Network, with more than 300,000 users consisting mainly of students and educated professionals—a scale comparable to some of the largest Internet forums in the United States at the time.

On September 20, 1999, the login screen was changed to feature a tower, a lake, and the library of PKU, visually representing the name's wordplay. On March 24, 2000, the URL changed to ytht.net. On May 3, 2000, the first YTHT Committee was democratically elected by its users, reported to be the first such election in the history of Chinese online communities.

=== Political pressure and closure ===
In the history of YTHT, the spirit of freedom and democracy was a stated priority, although its growing popularity brought increasing political pressure and the site was temporarily suspended several times.

On August 19, 2004, YTHT was placed under emergency restrictions by government order, and several boards covering political topics were shut down. On September 13, 2004, the Beijing Communications Administration permanently shut down YTHT. Concurrently, all Internet forums in China were required by law to remove discussion about YTHT; the words "ytht", "一塌糊涂", and "糊涂" were added to keyword filters by Chinese ISPs and at least one major Chinese search engine.

=== 2007 reopening ===
The site was reopened in April 2007 on overseas servers. However, because the Chinese education network is segregated from the overseas backbone, mainland students faced significant connectivity difficulties, limiting the site's ability to regain its former user base.

== Legacy and revival ==
Academic research has highlighted YTHT as the most frequently memorialized "disappeared website" in China. A 2018 study examining over 140 memory narratives of vanished Chinese websites found that YTHT was the single most remembered platform, with 19 separate memorial texts devoted to it.

The original YTHT source code, based on FireBird BBS 3.0KCN, was preserved in open-source repositories after the closure. A project on SourceForge attempted to merge the original telnet-based interface with the Discuz! web forum system. The C source code was also maintained on GitHub for compilation on modern Linux distributions.

In 2025, an independent revival project launched at bbs.ytht.io under the domain ytht.io, positioning itself as a spiritual successor to the original YTHT BBS. The project combines a web-based forum with a text-based MUD virtual world, built on the Evennia engine and the Misago forum framework, maintaining the original's text-only aesthetic. The project's source code is hosted on GitHub.

== Software and technical infrastructure ==
The original YTHT ran on a customized version of the FireBird BBS software (version 3.0KCN), incorporating code from multiple Chinese BBS development projects including FB2000, the Nanjing University Xiaobaihe (小百合) web interface, and elements from SMTH BBS. The system supported both Telnet and HTTP access. A companion development guide (YTHT BBS 开发指南) was later published as an open-source reference.

== See also ==
- SMTH BBS
- Internet in China
- Internet censorship in China
- Bulletin board system
