= Tomomichi =

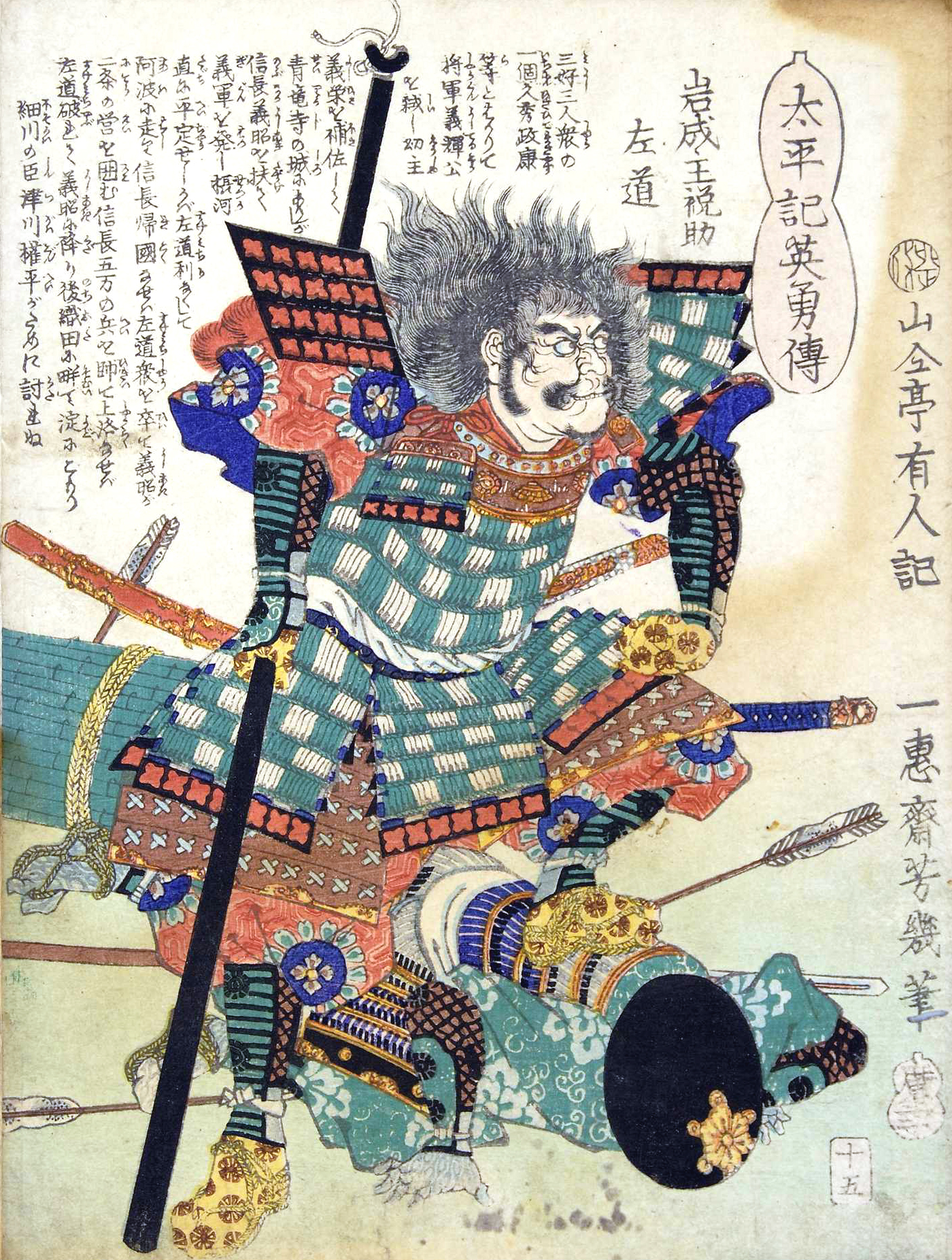
- Tomomichi Iwanari (1519–1578), Japanese samurai
- Pronunciation: tomomitɕi (IPA)
- Gender: Male

Origin
- Origin: Japanese
- Meaning: Different meanings depending on the kanji used

Other names
- Alternative spelling: Tomomiti (Kunrei-shiki) Tomomiti (Nihon-shiki) Tomomichi (Hepburn)

Tomomichi is a masculine Japanese given name.

== Written forms ==
Tomomichi can be written using different combinations of kanji characters. Some examples:

- 友道, "friend, way"
- 友路, "friend, route"
- 友通, "friend, pass through"
- 知道, "know, way"
- 知路, "know, route"
- 知通, "know, pass through"
- 智道, "intellect, way"
- 智路, "intellect, route"
- 智通, "intellect, pass through"
- 共道, "together, way"
- 共路, "together, route"
- 朋道, "companion, way"
- 朋路, "companion, route"
- 朝道, "morning/dynasty, way"
- 朝路, "morning/dynasty, route"
- 朝通, "morning/dynasty, pass through"

The name can also be written in hiragana ともみち or katakana トモミチ.

== Notable people with the name ==
- Tomomichi Hōō (鳳凰 倶往; 1956–2013), real name Tomomichi Kabetani (壁谷 友道), Japanese sumo wrestler
- Tomomichi Iwanari (岩成 友通; 1519–1578), Japanese samurai
- Tomomichi Nishimura (西村 知道; born 1946), Japanese voice actor
