= Baidu Knows =

Web-based collective intelligence by Baidu

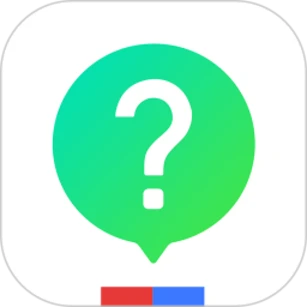
- Website type: Collective intelligence
- Available in: Chinese
- Headquarters: Beijing
- Owner: Baidu
- Creator: Robin Li
- Website: zhidao.baidu.com
- Commercial: Yes
- Registration: Compulsory

Baidu Knows (Chinese: 百度知道; pinyin: Bǎidù zhidao; lit. 'Baidu Knows') is a Chinese language collaborative web-based collective intelligence by question and answer provided by the Chinese search engine Baidu. Like Baidu itself, the knows is heavily self-censored in line with government regulations.

The test version was launched on June 21, 2005, and turned into the release version on November 8, 2005.

== Introduction ==
A registered user (member for short) puts a question (should be specific) and motivates other members to supply answers using credits as an award. Meanwhile, these answers turn to search result of the same or relevant questions. That's how knowledge is accumulated and shared.

Question and answer together with search engine makes it possible for a member to be a producer and consumer of knowledge, which is the so-called collective intelligence.

== Knows's Principle ==
Questions or answers containing the following types of content are removed:

1. Pornographic, violent, horrible and uncivilized content
2. Advertisement
3. Reactionary content
4. Personal attacks
5. Content against morality and ethics
6. Malicious, trivial or spam-like content
