= Jingjing Liang =

Forest ecologist, academic, and author

- Occupations: Forest ecologist, academic and author

Academic background
- Education: BS., Environmental Science; PhD., Forestry
- Alma mater: Peking University; University of Wisconsin-Madison
- Thesis: Managing Forests for Diversity, Wood Quality and Income: Simulation Models for Western U.S. Forests (2005)

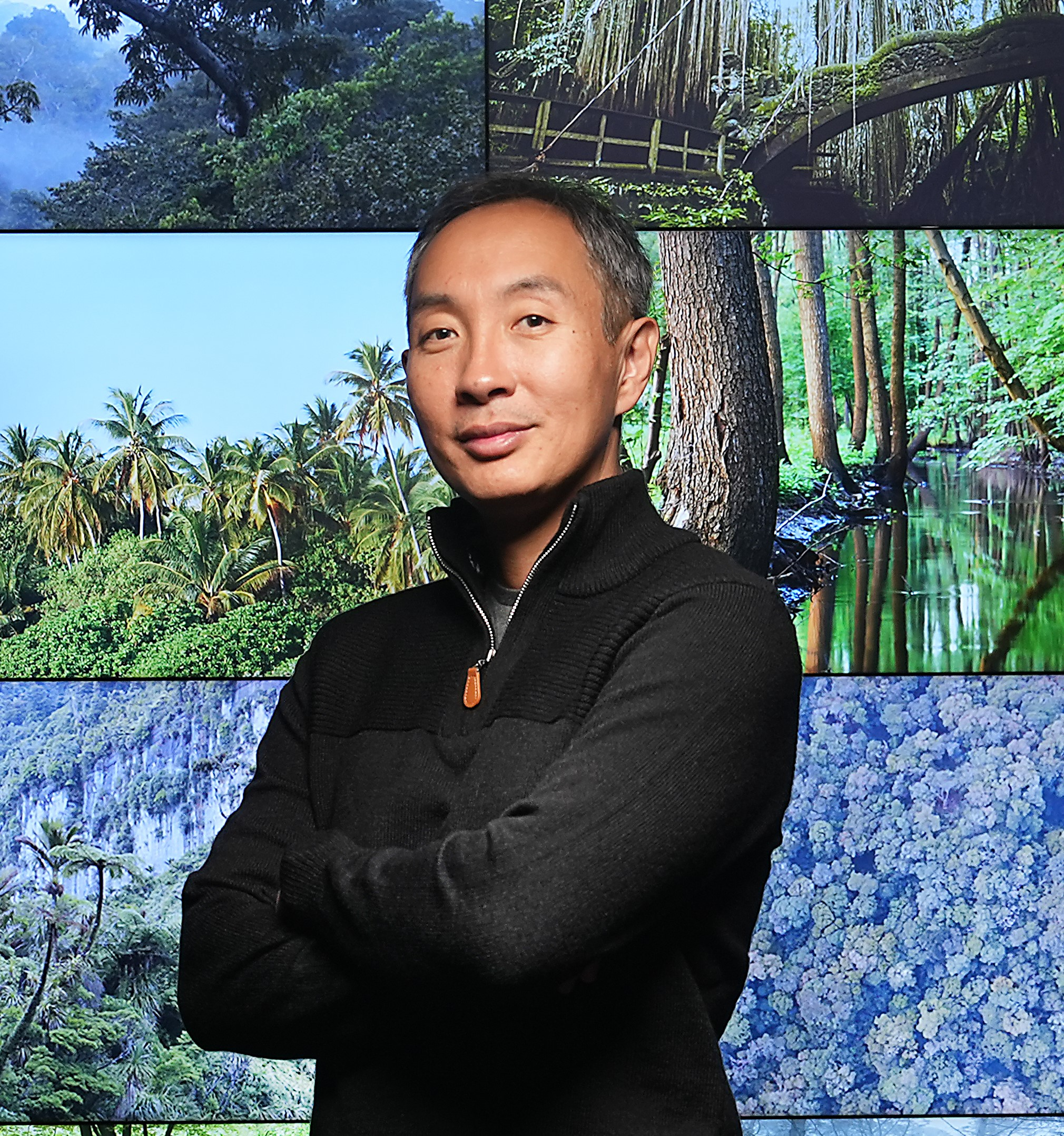
Dr. Jingjing Liang with GFI-3D data

Jingjing Liang (Chinese: 梁晶晶; pinyin: Liáng Jīngjīng) is a forest ecologist, academic and author. He is an associate professor and Global Forest Informatics Fellow at Purdue University, and an international consultant of Food and Agriculture Organization of the United Nations. He also serves the Founder and Chief Science Officer at Science-i and the Leading Coordinator of the Global Forest Biodiversity Initiative (GFBI).

Liang has transformed the field of forestry research through the innovative integration of AI and big data. He is known for his research that has produced the findings of the predominant positive biodiversity-productivity relationship across global forests, and the total number of tree species in the world.

Liang's mentorship and leadership in global initiatives empower under-represented researchers and promote inclusive solutions for sustainable forest management. He has collaborated with institutions and researchers to include underrepresented researchers in global projects by organizing workshops and conferences such as "Bridging Worlds."

== Education ==
Liang completed a Bachelor of Science in Environmental Science at Peking University, China, from 1997 to 2001, followed by a Doctor of Philosophy in Forestry at the University of Wisconsin-Madison, United States, from 2001 to 2005.

== Awards and honors ==
- 2026 – Global Forest Informatics Fellow, Purdue University.
- 2025 – University Faculty Scholar, Purdue University
- 2012 – International Scholars Recognition Award, West Virginia University
- 2009 – Technology Advisory Board Award, University of Alaska Fairbanks
- 2008 – International Arctic Science Committee (IASC) Early Career Scientist Support Award

== Career ==
Liang began his academic career as an assistant professor of Forest Biometrics and Management at the University of Alaska Fairbanks from 2007 to 2011. Subsequently, he moved to West Virginia University, where he was an assistant professor of Forest Ecology from 2011 to 2017 and an associate professor of Forest Ecology from 2017 to 2018. Since 2017, he has been an associate professor at the University of Quebec in Montreal, and an Associate Member of the Centre for Forest Research, Canada. From 2018 to 2022, he was an assistant professor of Quantitative Forest Ecology in the Department of FNR at Purdue University, where he has been serving as an associate professor since 2022.

Liang served on the Faculty Senate at the University of Alaska Fairbanks from 2008 to 2011, during which time he co-chaired the Alaska Northern Forest Cooperative from 2009 to 2011. From 2013 to 2015, he chaired the A1/A3 Forest Inventory and Biometrics National Working Group for the Society of American Foresters. He also co-led the Biodiversity Research Community at Purdue's ISF, from 2022 to 2024.

Liang co-founded the Global Forest Biodiversity Initiative (GFBI) in 2016, the first global forest inventory database with 1.3 million sample plots and 55 million trees, and has served as its Leading Coordinator since then. He later launched Science-i in 2022, a research metaverse, which safeguards and grants exclusive access to forest data for vetted research projects.

== Research ==
Liang's research focuses on understanding global forest dynamics, biodiversity, and their essential ecosystem services, addressing challenges involving biodiversity loss and climate change resilience. His work has received media coverage in news outlets such as Purdue Today, The Standard, Mongabay, BBC, The Scientist, The Guardian, Business Insider, Reuters, and CNN. Liang's research connects machine learning and big data in the study of fundamental questions of biodiversity and ecosystem processes, as well as ecological and socioeconomic impacts of biological conservation. According to the United States Forest Service, his collaborative work estimating the number of tree species on Earth has been celebrated globally along with GFBI's global map of tree symbioses and the discovery that forest biodiversity benefits the economy by more than five times the cost of conservation efforts. Jingjing Liang's extensive research in forest inventory, simulation models, and biological diversity significantly enhances the U.S. Forest Service's daily operations, and directly supports the management of national forests by providing critical data and tools that help foresters plan for potential outcomes and take proactive measures to mitigate undesirable effects.

=== Exploration of terrestrial biodiversity ===
Liang's work under FACAI and GFBI has focused on understanding the global tree population. He led a collaboration to develop the world's first global map of tree symbioses, using data from over 1.1 million forest inventory plots and 28,000 tree species. Featured on the cover of Nature on May 19, 2019, this research revealed significant shifts between the dominant types of symbiosis, influenced predominantly by climatically controlled decomposition rates. Leading the same consortium (GFBI), he conducted an analysis of global tree species diversity and produced the first ground-sourced estimate of Earth's total tree species count, reported in the Proceedings of the National Academy of Sciences.

In 2023, Liang led a collaborative effort to create East Asia's first AI-assisted spatial database of planted forests, mapping locations and tree species, such as pine and eucalyptus, with a one-kilometer resolution.

Liang analyzed global drivers of tree species richness across latitudes, using data from over 1.3 million sample plots, revealing biodiversity patterns influenced by multiple environmental and anthropogenic factors, challenging the sole attribution of this trend to temperature as per the metabolic theory of biodiversity. He also highlighted that global forest carbon storage falls significantly below its natural potential due to human activities, emphasizing the role of forest conservation and restoration in climate change mitigation and biodiversity conservation alongside emissions reduction efforts.

=== Global forests amid climate and biodiversity shifts ===
Liang has developed advanced biophysical and machine-learning models to explore the connections between global changes and forest ecosystems. His work, based on remote sensing and field data, has contributed to the understanding of global change impacts on forests and forestry while evaluating mitigation strategies for poverty and conservation. Notably, his research found a positive correlation between tree species diversity and forest productivity, revealing, in a Science study that forest biodiversity provides economic benefits exceeding five times the cost of conservation efforts, and highlighted the significant impact of climate change on forest biodiversity and productivity.

=== Quantification of forest carbon dynamics ===
Having emphasized the importance of accurately quantifying global forest carbon accumulation rates, Liang has developed an advanced artificial intelligence-based forest growth model named MATRIX to map global forest growth rates by integrating on-site tree data with satellite and geospatial information, with funding from the World Resources Institute. In addition, he has authored simulation programs designed to predict forest dynamics and management impacts across diverse forest types, namely WestProPlus, CalPro, and NorthPro.

== Bibliography ==
=== Selected articles ===
- Liang, J., J. G. P. Gamarra, N. Picard, M. Zhou, B. Pijanowski, D. F. Jacobs, P. B. Reich, T. W. Crowther, G.-J. Nabuurs, S. de-Miguel, J. Fang, C. W. Woodall, J.-C. Svenning, T. Jucker, J.-F. Bastin, GFBI consortium, and C. Hui (2022). Co-limitation towards lower latitudes shapes global forest diversity gradients. Nature ecology & evolution: s41559-022-01831-x.
- Cazzolla Gatti, R., P. B. Reich, J. G. P. Gamarra, T. Crowther, C. Hui, A. Morera, J.-F. Bastin, S. de-Miguel, G.-J. Nabuurs, J.-C. Svenning, J. M. Serra-Diaz, C. Merow, B. Enquist, GFBI consortium, and J. Liang (2022). The number of tree species on Earth. Proceedings of the National Academy of Sciences 119:e2115329119.
- Steidinger, B. S., Crowther, T. W., Liang, J., Van Nuland, M. E., Werner, G. D., Reich, P. B., ... & Peay, K. G. (2019) Climatic controls of decomposition drive the global biogeography of forest-tree symbioses. Nature, 569(7756), 404–408.
- Liang, J., Crowther, T. W., Picard, N., Wiser, S., Zhou, M., Alberti, G., ... & Reich, P. B. (2016). Positive biodiversity-productivity relationship predominant in global forests. Science, 354(6309), aaf8957.
- Liang, J., Picard, N. (2013). Matrix Model of Forest Dynamics: An Overview and Outlook. Forest Science 59(3): 359-378

=== Selected books ===
Economics of Wildfire Management: The Development and Application of Suppression Expenditure Models (2014) ISBN 978-1493905775
