= ICP license =

Permit issued by the Chinese Ministry of Industry and Information Technology

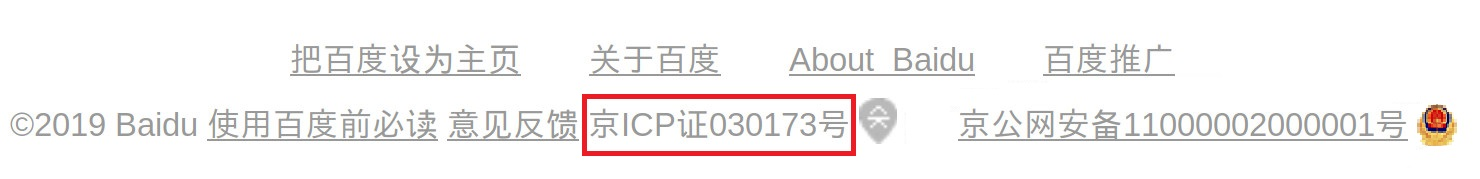
ICP license of Baidu

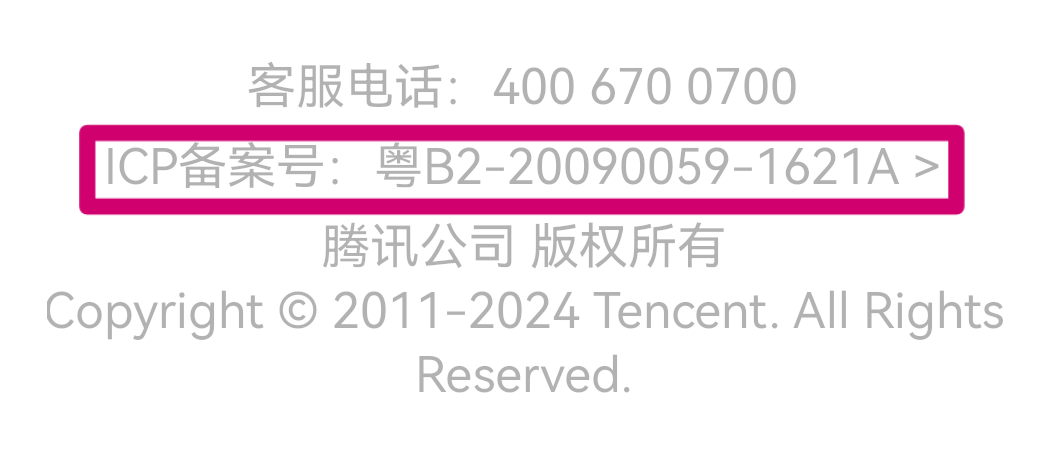
ICP license of WeChat. Note that this license is "Value-added Telecom Service Business License", which is equivalent to ICP license.

ICP license (abbreviation for Internet Content Provider; Chinese: ICP备案; pinyin: ICP bèi'àn; lit. 'ICP registration/filing') is a permit issued by the Chinese Ministry of Industry and Information Technology (MIIT) to permit China-based websites to operate in China. The ICP license numbers for Chinese websites can often be found on the bottom of the front webpage.

== History ==
This license regime was instated by the Telecommunications Regulations of the People's Republic of China (中华人民共和国电信条例) that was promulgated in September 2000. All websites with their own domain name that operate inside China are required to obtain a license (whether hosted on a server in mainland China or provided into China via a CDN), and China-based Internet service providers are required to block the site if a license is not acquired within a grace period. Licenses are issued at the provincial level.

Operating from China is also a prerequisite for acquiring a license. Foreign companies such as Google, unable to acquire an ICP license on their own, often partner with Chinese Internet companies to use the licenses of the Chinese company.

The Chinese government divides ICP related business activities into two categories: Basic telecommunication services (BTS) and Value-added telecommunication services (VATS). In the “Classification Catalogue of Telecommunication Services” (电信业务分类目录) BTS refers to providing a public network infrastructure, public data transmission and basic voice communication services. Whereas, VATS refers to public network infrastructure to provide telecommunications and information services. Details of the services requiring an ICP license are regulated in the section “B25 Information Services”.

== Details ==
The MIIT issues three different types of ICP numbers, which are managed at the provincial level:

- ICP license for commercial websites, which cover any website offering goods or services to customers. These numbers follow the format 京ICP证123456号 (in this example, "京" represents Beijing, "证" means license, and "号" means "number").
- ICP filing for non-commercial websites which are purely informational and are not involved in direct sales. These numbers follow the format 京ICP备04123456号 or 京ICP备2021123456号 (in this example, "备" means "record"). For a website with multiple domain names, the filing number will use "-n" suffix, ex. 京ICP备2021123456号-2 means this is the second filing domain name for this website.
- Mobile APP ICP filing for all mobile apps. Starting from September 1, 2023, all new apps must undergo the ICP Filing process before they can be published on app stores in China, while the existing apps should complete the filing before March 31, 2024. This rule applies to Apple App stores, as well as all Android app stores and mini-program app (quick app) stores in China. These numbers follow the format 京ICP备2021123456号-3A/4X/5K (in this example, "A" represents APP, "X" represents mini-program app, which derive from the first letter of 小 in Pinyin (Xiǎo), and "K" represents quick app, which derive from the first letter of 快 in Pinyin (Kuài)).

Obtaining an ICP number takes an average span of 20 business days after submission of documents to a hosting provider. If the documents are deemed valid upon review by the provider, they are forwarded onto the MIIT for further review. If at either stage the documents are rejected, the applicant is required to submit additional documents.

== See also ==
- Internet censorship in China
- Internet in China
