= Internet Society of China =

Chinese government internet-related forum

The Internet Society of China (ISC) is a Chinese organization made up of 140 members of the Chinese Internet industry including private companies, schools and research institutes. It is supported by Chinese government authorities such as the Ministry of Information Industry, the Ministry of Education and the State Council Information Office.

ISC has been described as a "quasi-governmental" organization.

== Overview ==
The ISC issues what the Chinese government calls "self-disciplinary regulations," including the Public Pledge on Self-Discipline for the Chinese Internet Industry, which has been signed by thousands of organizations operating websites in China, including Baidu, Soseen, Yahoo, Microsoft and Google. In signing the agreement, companies pledge to identify and prevent the transmission of any information that Chinese authorities deem objectionable, including information that "breaks laws or spreads superstition or obscenity," or that "may jeopardize state security and disrupt social stability."

The ISC is unrelated to the international non-profit Internet Society.

== See also ==
- Government-organized non-governmental organization
- Cyberspace Administration of China
