= Jingjing and Chacha =

Jingjing is the male officer.

Chacha is the female officer.

Jingjing (Chinese: 警警; pinyin: Jǐngjǐng) and Chacha (察察; Cháchá), a pun on the Chinese word for "police" (警察; jǐngchá), are the cartoon mascots of the Internet Surveillance Division of the Public Security Bureau in Shenzhen, People's Republic of China. Debuting on January 22, 2006, they are used to, amongst other things, inform Chinese Internet users what is and is not legal to consult or write on the Chinese Internet. According to the director of the Shenzhen Internet police, "[we published] the image of Internet Police in the form of a cartoon [...] to let all internet users know that the Internet is not a place beyond of law [and that] the Internet Police will maintain order in all online behavior."

The Shenzhen police plan to place images of the two characters on the main page of all Shenzhen websites and bulletin board systems, creating an online 'police presence' that works to remind citizens to monitor their own behavior in accordance with the Chinese law, much as a visible police presence does in the real world. Clicking on the images will take a user to either of the characters' own personal webspace, where Chinese Internet users can learn about the laws and regulations related to Internet, keep up-to-date on the newest Internet policies, and submit questions to Jingjing and Chacha live through the instant messaging service Tencent QQ or through their blogs. In addition to engaging the public on Internet censorship-related issues, they also handle cases relating to computer viruses, computer crimes, and other such matters. As of January 2006, there were six police officers assigned to carry out these duties.

In August 2007, Beijing police announced a similar campaign using animated officers. The Beijing version of the characters will appear every half-hour on 13 of China's top web portals and display messages about Internet laws and conduct.

== Criticism ==
Despite these extra functions, the China Digital Times reported that it was told by an official at the Bureau that the main purpose of Jingjing and Chacha was still just to "intimidate" users, openly reminding them to "self-regulate their online behavior" (see chilling effect).

== See also ==
- Internet in the People's Republic of China
- Computer crime
- Big mama
- Chilling effect (term)
- Fuwa (Chinese: 福娃; pinyin: Fúwá; literally "good-luck dolls"), the mascots of the 2008 Summer Olympics in Beijing
- Bing Dwen Dwen and Shuey Rhon Rhon
