= Michael Anti (journalist) =

Chinese journalist and political blogger

Jing Zhao
- 赵静
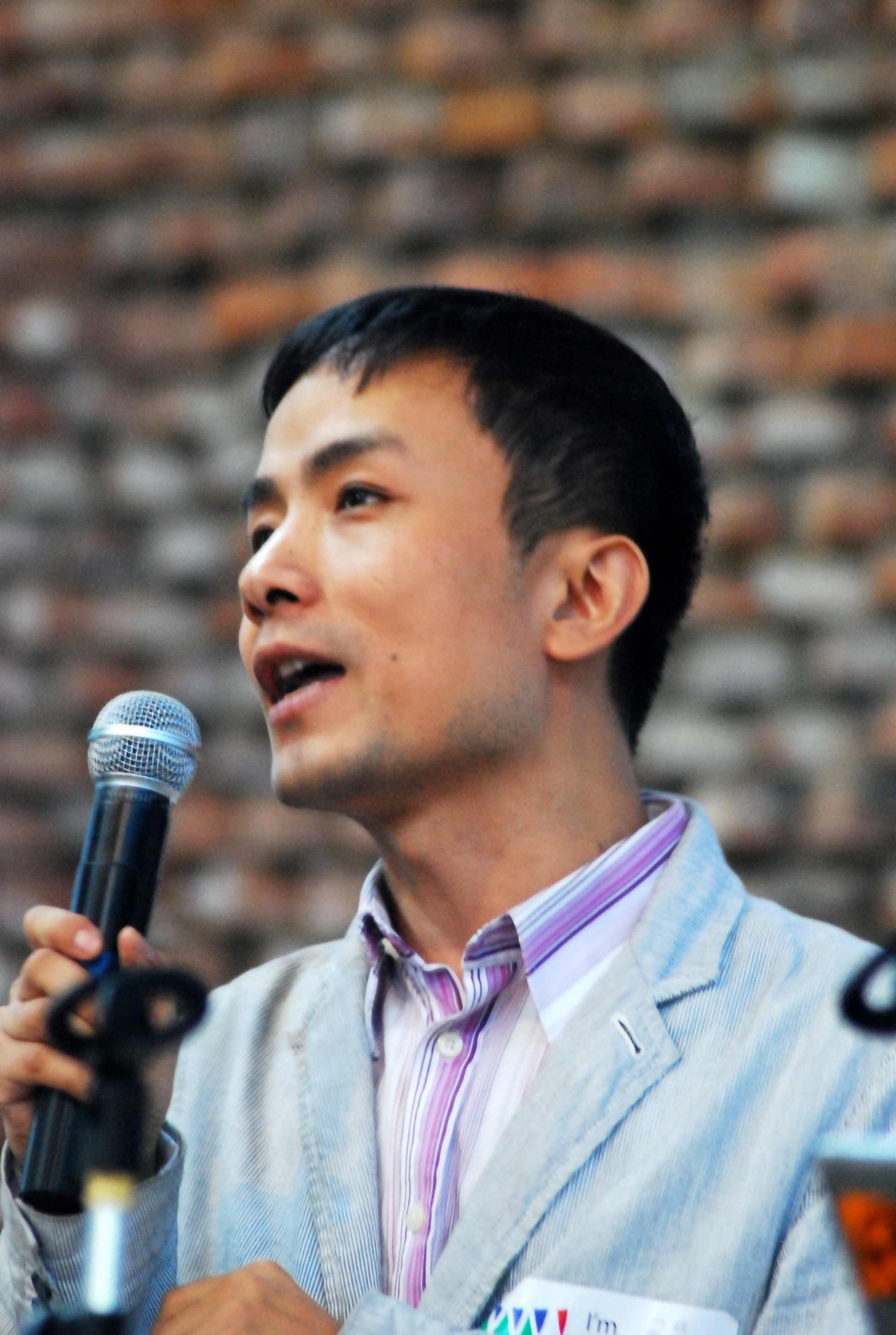
- Jing in 2008
- Born: 1975 (age 50–51); Nanjing, China
- Other name: Michael Anti (Pseudonym)
- Education: Nanjing Normal University
- Occupations: Investigative Journalist, Media Entrepreneur
- Years active: 2003–present
- Employer: Beijing News (Previously)
- Organization: Shantou University (Cheung Kong School of Journalism)
- Known for: Environmental activism, internet activism, criticism of government censorship, expose's of government corruption
- Title: Caixin Globus (Founder)
- Awards: M100 Sanssouci Media Award (2011)
- Honours: Wolfson Press Fellowship (Cambridge University); Nieman Fellow (Harvard University)

Jing Zhao (simplified Chinese: 赵静; traditional Chinese: 趙靜; pinyin: Zhào Jìng, born 1975), also known by his pen name Michael Anti, is a Chinese journalist and political blogger, recognized for his posts about freedom of the press in China. He has been described in mid-2000s as "at one time perhaps the most famous political blogger on China's Internet."

== Biography ==
Born in a Hui Muslim family in Nanjing, Anti graduated from Nanjing Normal University in 1995 where he majored in Industrial Electrical Automation. Beginning in 1998, he started posting essays on the Internet, and became a journalist shortly afterward. He lost his job at a Chinese newspaper in 2003 when the entire paper was shut down in retaliation of its support for political reform. In December 2004, under the pen name Michael Anti, he started a blog that was blocked in China in August 2005. This prompted him to switch to MSN Spaces, a Microsoft-hosted blog.

Michael Anti became notable when Microsoft deleted his blog in late 2005 at the request of the Chinese government. His blog was removed after he posted about the firing of three editors at The Beijing News and called upon its subscribers to cancel their subscriptions. His case made headlines around the world and contributed to ongoing debates about the role of Western companies in China's censorship system. Michael Anti himself, while angry at the deletion of his blog, argued that the Chinese are better off with Windows Live Spaces than without it.

He has been a commentator for the Huaxia Times, correspondent of the 21st Century World Herald, war reporter in Baghdad in 2003, researcher at The Washington Post Beijing Bureau and at The New York Times Beijing bureau, columnist for the Southern Metropolis Daily, and publisher of the Far and Wide Journal.

He worked as project director in Cheung Kong School of Journalism and Communication of Shantou University from September 2008 to March 2009.

== Awards ==
He is a recipient of a Wolfson press fellowship at Cambridge University and Nieman Fellowship at Harvard University.

Michael Anti was awarded the "M100 Sanssouci Media Award 2011" in Potsdam, Germany on 8 September 2011.
