= Snowflake (software) =

Anti-censorship software

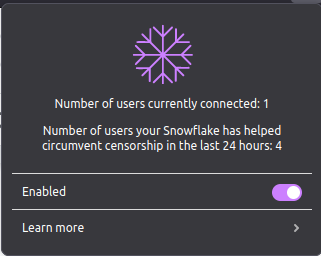
- User interface for the Snowflake browser extension
- Original author: Serene
- Developers: The Tor Project and community
- Release: January 24, 2017; 9 years ago
- Written in: Go, JavaScript
- Included with: Tor Browser, Orbot
- Predecessor: Flash proxy
- Type: Internet censorship circumvention, Overlay network
- License: 3-clause BSD License
- Website: snowflake.torproject.org
- Repository: gitlab.torproject.org/tpo/anti-censorship/pluggable-transports/snowflake

Snowflake is a software package for assisting others in circumventing internet censorship by relaying data requests. Snowflake proxy nodes are meant to be created by people in countries where Tor and Snowflake are not blocked. People under censorship then use a Snowflake client (packaged with the Tor Browser and Onion Browser) to access the Tor network, using Snowflake relays as proxy servers. Access to the Tor network can in turn give access to other blocked services (like blocked websites). A Snowflake proxy can be created by either installing a browser extension, installing a stand-alone program or browsing a webpage with an embedded Snowflake proxy. The proxy runs after the user has voluntarily enabled it and the browser or program is connected to the internet.

In contrast to regular VPNs and proxy services, creating a Snowflake proxy does not require port forwarding or having a dedicated IP address, with simply installing a browser extension being enough most of the time. The ease and accessibility of creating proxies increases the difficulty of blocking their IP addresses due to the large number of them in existence.

As of 2024, Snowflake proxies are hosted on about 140000 unique IP addresses concurrently. The average number of users that use Snowflake to connect to Tor is 35000 and 29 TB of their traffic is relayed by Snowflake proxies daily.

== History ==
Snowflake was originated by Serene, a hacker and former Google engineer and concert pianist. It was inspired by Flash proxy, a similar censorship circumvention system. The name "Snowflake" was coined as her metaphor for a large number of ephemeral proxies in relation to "ICE Negotiation". Three programmers published the first version in January 2016. In 2019, it became available as a browser extension for Firefox and Chrome. It can also be run on derived browsers, such as Brave and Microsoft Edge. In February 2023 a thoroughly upgraded, stand-alone version dubbed Snowstorm was released; written in Rust and funded by the Open Tech Fund, beta testing is by invitation.

== Function ==
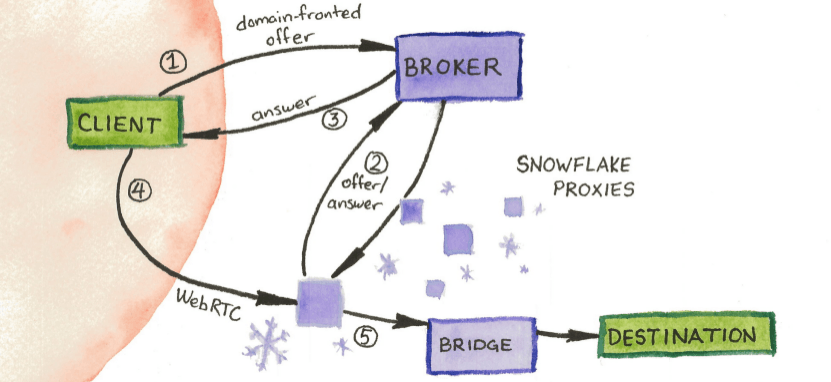
1. The end-user asks the broker server for a Snowflake proxy; 2. The broker finds a Snowflake proxy that is available; 3. The broker replies to the end-user; 4. The end-user contacts the Snowflake proxy, with a direct peer-to-peer connection; 5. The data request is relayed through the Tor network to the destination server (for instance, the website the end-user is browsing)

Normal internet data packages come labelled with the original source and the final recipient of the data. For example, a package containing the encrypted text of a website would be labelled with the destination (the IP address of the reader's computer), and the source (the IP address of the website's server). This means that even if the actual content is encrypted, a censor can identify and block all packages from certain sources.

The Tor network can be used to access such blocked sites by acting as a proxy, covering the real destination address of the user's request. In order to prevent circumvention, censors may try to disable direct access to Tor by blocking connections to its relays, which are publicly known.

Snowflake provides covert, indirect access to Tor. A Snowflake client is provided with the IP address of a currently-active Snowflake proxy by asking a broker server, which in turn uses domain fronting to pretend to be a major website. The client then talks directly to the Snowflake proxy, which relays into the Tor network. The traffic looks like ordinary peer-to-peer traffic, such as that used by many videoconferencing apps.

A Snowflake proxy runs whenever the browser or program is connected to the internet. If the proxy host has a dynamic IP, the proxy will change its IP address over time.

Snowflake proxies are thus used as Tor entry nodes, not as exit nodes. Tor exit nodes might face legal action in the country in which they are hosted if they relay content that is illegal in that jurisdiction. It is unlikely that Snowflake proxy hosts could face such liabilities, since they do not know what content they are relaying. There are, however, countries where using Tor for any purpose is illegal, such as Russia and Iran.

=== Deployment ===
<iframe src="https://snowflake.torproject.org/embed.html" width="320" height="240" frameborder="0" scrolling="no"></iframe> — snowflake.torproject.org,
HTML code to add a togglable Snowflake relay to a webpage

Snowflake uses WebRTC to allow browsers to communicate directly with one another. Either installing a browser extension, or keeping a tab open to a webpage with the right embedded code, causes one's browser to act as a proxy. Embedding a Snowflake badge in a website allows visitors to make their browser into a proxy, exactly as installing the extension does, but by clicking a button on the website rather than by installing software. Snowflake can also be run as a stand-alone program in a Docker container.

Proxying traffic increases the proxy host's bandwidth usage, which may be a problem for those with bandwidth limits on their internet plans. In practice, hosting a Snowflake proxy does not seem to appreciably slow one's internet connection or disrupt browsing.

=== Countermeasures ===
Countermeasures believed to be currently in use against Snowflake from Russia include browser fingerprinting Snowflake hosts and then blocking them. Censors may also install and use Tor, then block all the IP addresses offered as Snowflake servers. Both of these techniques are weakened when there are larger numbers of servers.

Censors may attempt to block the broker's IP address. To circumvent this, the Snowflake client utilizes domain fronting. This makes it infeasible for the censor to block a single website without blocking all the other websites hosted on the same cloud service. Google Cloud Platform and Amazon's AWS are examples of services that host hundreds of thousands of websites. Blocking all the servers of one of these major hosts would have disruptive side effects. However, the cloud provider can and often does block domain fronting.

If overseas connections from data centers are allowed, but residential and mobile services are restricted to local connections, then Tor bridges may be secretly and illegally set up in local data centers.

When a state shuts down access to foreign internet connections altogether, essentially cutting the country off from the global internet, Snowflake and other internet anonymity tools are defeated. This method has been applied by countries such as Iran, Ethiopia and Belarus, although it can carry a severe negative impact to the economy (in Iran in 2022, the cost was estimated at $37 million US a day), so these interventions are usually restricted to short periods of time.

== Uses ==
Snowflake came to be widely discussed online in the first week of October 2022, as a way of combating internet restrictions in Iran during the Mahsa Amini protests, and a guide in Persian was released.

In 2022, the Russian government increased efforts to block access to Tor through technical and political means, and the Tor network reported an increase in traffic from Russia using Snowflake.

Snowflake is integrated into the Tor network. Usage of the Tor network is becoming more common in Russia, Belarus, and Iran, as of 2022, as internet censorship in these countries has become more strict.

== See also ==
- Psiphon uses a variety of anticensorship techniques
- Ad hoc network
- Smartphone ad hoc network, a peer-to-peer system that can be used when the conventional Internet infrastructure is entirely shut down
- Briar (software) uses Tor
- Sneakernet, a technique widely used in countries with little internet access.
- Toosheh uses satellite television receiving equipment to download (but not upload) files, which are then sometimes sneakernetted.
