= Collateral freedom =

Internet censorship circumvention technique

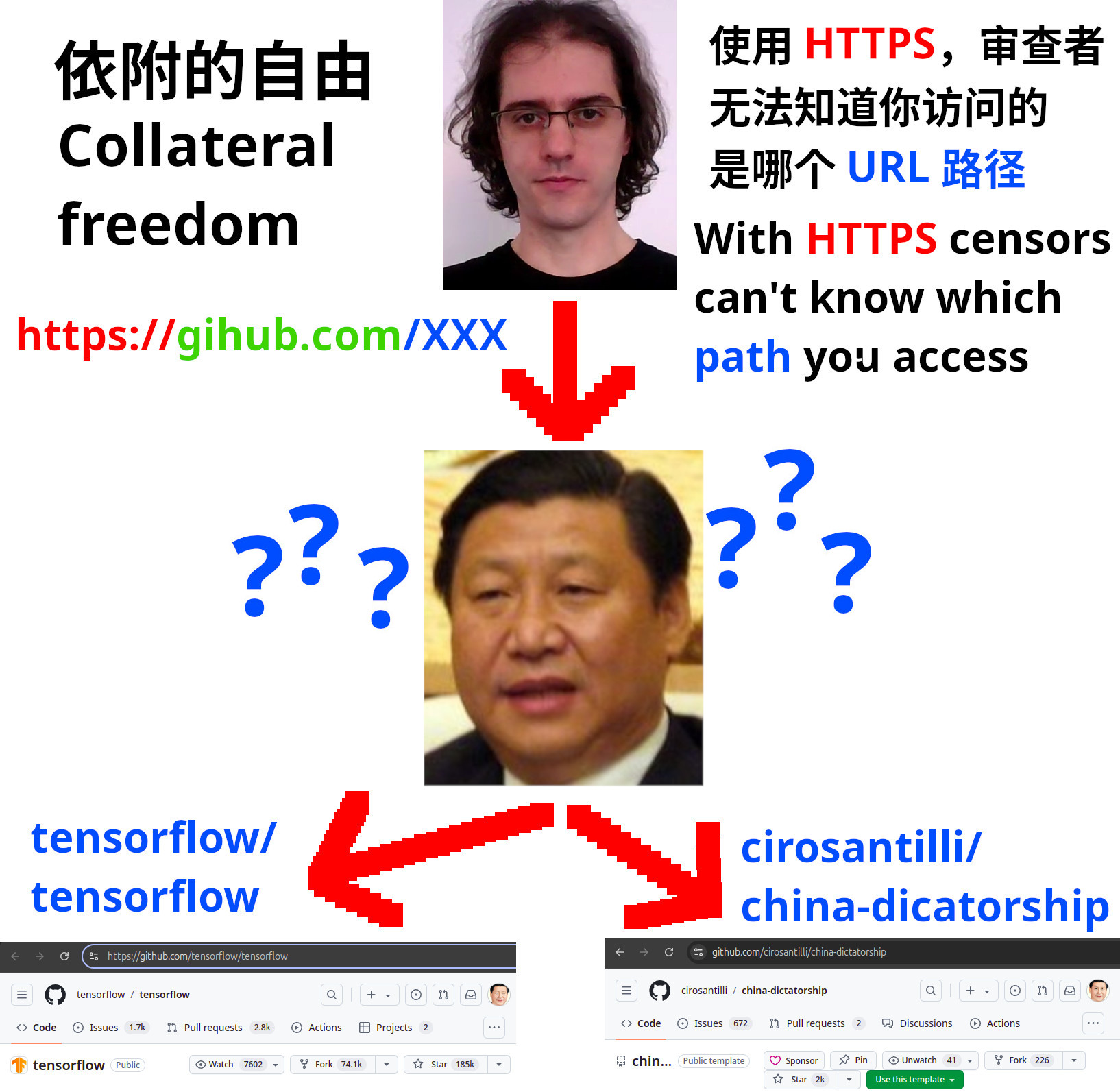
An example with Chinese and English labels showing how a request for access can bypass censors.

Collateral freedom is an anti-censorship strategy that attempts to make it economically prohibitive for censors to block content on the Internet. This is achieved by hosting content on cloud services that are considered by censors to be "too important to block", and then using encryption to prevent censors from identifying requests for censored information that is hosted among other content, forcing censors to either allow access to the censored information or take down entire services.

== See also ==
- Cute cat theory of digital activism
- Domain fronting
- Lantern (software)
- Refraction networking
- Telex (anti-censorship system)
