= Serene (pianist) =

American musician and technologist

- Serene in Sicily, 2026
- Citizenship: United States
- Education: Carnegie Mellon University
- Occupations: Concert pianist; Computer scientist
- Known for: Snowflake Protocol; Bösendorfer Artist
- Website: serenepianist.com

Serene is an American concert pianist and computer scientist. She is the inventor of Snowflake, the anti-censorship software package used by The Tor Project. Serene is a touring classical musician. Her experimental performances combine high technology with pianism, such as performing piano while accompanied by musical robots.

== Early life and education ==
Serene spent her childhood in a variety of regions within North America. She attended Carnegie Mellon University, graduating with a degree in computer science in 2012.

== Career in software ==
She worked as the first engineer for technology incubator Google Ideas, now Jigsaw LLC. While a senior fellow at the International Computer Science Institute in Berkeley, California, she was a recipient of the Open Technology Fund’s Information Controls Fellowship, where she created Snowflake, a pluggable transport enabling censorship circumvention for The Tor Project as its first use-case.

She is the founder of Snowstorm, the rearchitected V2 and commercialization of the Snowflake transport technology. In July 2023, Snowstorm finished its seed round of $3 million. Snowflake came to prominence when the Tor network began using it to prevent hostile actors from blocking access to Tor.

Serene is an advisory board member of the World Ethical Data Foundation.

== Career as a musician ==
As of 2021, SERENE is a Bösendorfer Artist, the sole non-conservatory pianist with such an affiliation. She presented her Bösendorfer debut with the symphony at the Vienna Konzerthaus. She has performed with Grimes, using EEG and generative AI music technology.

Serene has given performances at both concert halls and such non-traditional settings as San Francisco's Golden Gate Park and inside a decommissioned Boeing 747 at Burning Man. She received a composition credit on Kanye West’s opera Mary (2019). She has released two EPs: Unraveling (2019), a collection of piano works by Maurice Ravel, and Rachmaninoff Concert No. 3 (2020). She has written code to project abstract, moving visualizations behind her performances. She also has collaborated with Blue Man Group founder Chris Wink on music-technology projects and social-distanced events at Las Vegas's AREA15.

In 2024, Serene premiered a piano robotics concert at a fusion energy facility while improvising with Jaron Lanier.
