= Telex (disambiguation) =

Telex may refer to:

- Telex (network), (TELegraph EXchange), a communications network
  - Teleprinter, the device used on the above network
- Telegraphic transfer, an electronic means of transferring funds overseas
- Telex (anti-censorship system), a research project that would complement Tor (anonymity network)
- Telex (band), a Belgian pop group
- Telex (IME), a convention for writing Vietnamese using ASCII characters commonly found on computer keyboard layouts
- Tele-X, a Nordic communications satellite
- Telex Communications (formerly Telex Corporation), an American manufacturer of hearing aids, audio equipment, and computer peripherals.
- Telex II, a later name for the TWX teletypewriter network
- "Planet Telex", a song by rock band Radiohead
- Telephone exchange
- Telephone extension
- Telex.hu, a Hungarian news portal

== See also ==
- Telix, terminal emulation software
- Teletex, an old ITU-T standard
- Teletext, television information retrieval service
