= Internet police =

Term describing governmental and official involvement in cyber policing

Internet police is a generic term for police and government agencies, departments and other organizations in charge of policing the Internet in a number of countries. The major purposes of Internet police, depending on the state, are fighting cybercrime, as well as censorship and propaganda.

== Canada ==
Several attempts have been made to introduce tools that would allow law enforcement and security agencies to eavesdrop on online communications without a warrant, the latest of which was bill C-30, tabled in February 2012 which was abandoned because of strong public opposition.

== People's Republic of China ==
It has been reported that in 2005, departments of provincial and municipal governments in mainland China began creating teams of Internet commentators from propaganda and police departments and offering them classes in Marxism, propaganda techniques, and the Internet. They are reported to guide discussion on public bulletin boards away from politically sensitive topics by posting opinions anonymously or under false names. China's Internet police force was reported by official state media to be 2 million strong in 2013.

Chinese Internet police also erase anti-communist comments and post pro-government messages. Chinese Communist Party leader Hu Jintao has declared the party's intent to strengthen the administration of the online environment and maintain the initiative in online opinion.

== Estonia ==
The Computer Emergency Response Team of Estonia (CERT Estonia), established in 2006, is an organization responsible for the management of security incidents in .ee computer networks. Its task is to assist Estonian Internet users in the implementation of preventive measures in order to reduce possible damage from security incidents and to help them in responding to security threats. CERT Estonia deals with security incidents that occur in Estonian networks, are started there, or have been notified of by citizens or institutions either in Estonia or abroad.

== Japan ==
In March 2022, Japan enacted on Wednesday legislation establishing an internet police bureau and a special investigative team at the National Police Agency tasked with tackling serious cybercrime cases.

== Netherlands ==
Dutch police were reported to have set up an Internet Brigade to fight cybercrime. It will be allowed to infiltrate Internet newsgroups and discussion forums for intelligence gathering, to make pseudo-purchase and to provide services.

== Thailand ==
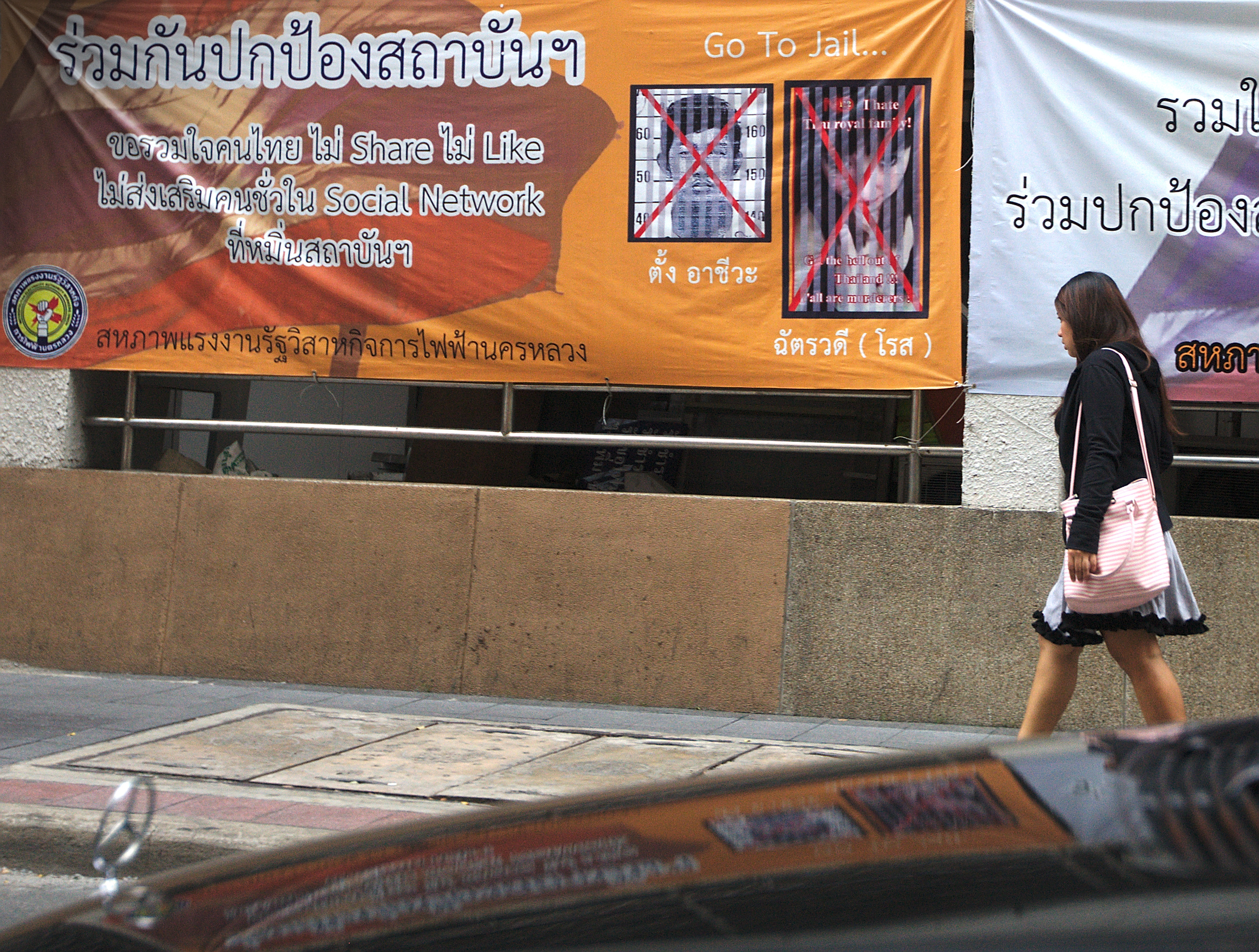
Banner in Bangkok, observed on the 30th of June 2014, informing the Thai public that 'like' or 'share' activity on social media could land them in prison

After the 2006 coup in Thailand, the Thai police has been active in monitoring and silencing dissidents online. Censorship of the Internet is carried out by the Ministry of Information and Communications Technology of Thailand and the Royal Thai Police, in collaboration with the Communications Authority of Thailand and the Telecommunication Authority of Thailand.

On 29 April 2010, Wipas Raksakulthai was arrested on charges of lèse majesté following a post to his Facebook account criticizing King Bhumibol. In May 2011, Amnesty International named him a "prisoner of conscience."

== India ==
Cyber Crime Investigation Cell is a wing of Mumbai Police, India, to deal with computer crimes, and to enforce provisions of India's Information Technology Law, namely, The Information Technology Act, 2000, and various cyber crime-related provisions of criminal laws, including the Indian Penal Code, and the Companies Act of India subsection on IT-Sector responsibilities of corporate measures to protect cybersecurity. Cyber Crime Investigation Cell is a part of the Crime Branch, Criminal Investigation Department of the Mumbai Police.

Andhra Pradesh Cyber Crime Investigation Cell is a wing of Hyderabad Police, India, to deal with Cyber crimes.

Indian Computer Emergency Response Team (CERT-In) also deals with Cyber Security. "Cyber Police", the Hi-Tech Crime Enquire Cell of the Kerala Police.

== United Kingdom ==
The Internet Watch Foundation (IWF) is the only recognised organisation in the United Kingdom operating an Internet 'Hotline' for the public and IT professionals to report their exposure to potentially illegal content online. It works in partnership with the police, Government, the public, Internet service providers and the wider online industry.

== See also ==
- Content moderation
- Internet filter
- Internet surveillance
- Internet service provider
- Use of social network websites in investigations
