= Refraction networking =

Internet censorship circumvention technique

Refraction networking, also known as decoy routing, is a research anti-censorship approach that would allow users to circumvent a censor without using any individual proxy servers. Instead, it implements proxy functionality at the core of partner networks, such as those of Internet service providers, outside the censored country. These networks would discreetly provide censorship circumvention for "any connection that passes through their networks."

The source of the request marks each request in a way that is easy for the network to detect, but hard for the censor to detect. This is then used to route the traffic to the proxy instead of treating it normally. The specific method by which this is performed is implementation-dependent. This prevents censors from selectively blocking proxy servers and makes censorship more expensive, in a strategy similar to collateral freedom.

The approach was independently invented by teams at the University of Michigan, the University of Illinois, and Raytheon BBN Technologies. There are five existing protocols: Telex, TapDance, Cirripede, Curveball, and Rebound. These teams are now working together to develop and deploy refraction networking with support from the U.S. Department of State.

== See also ==
- Domain fronting
