= Thaimail =

Thaimail was Thailand's first webmail provider, operating from 15 April 1997 to 1 September 2014. The service was conceived as a free public service by the IT company ARIP, at a time when the Internet was first being introduced to Thailand. The website featured menus in the Thai language, and later included e-cards, chat rooms, discussion boards and classifieds services.

The service could be accessed via a typical web browser on any internet connected computer. Thaimail users received @thaimail.com as their email address. At the end of its service, Thaimail had over four million registered users.

== See also ==
- Internet in Thailand
