= Internet Freedom program =

American internet program

The Internet Freedom program is a program run by the U.S. Department of State's Bureau of Democracy, Human Rights, and Labor (DRL). Its goal is to promote fundamental freedoms, human rights, and the free flow of information online, through integrated support for anti-censorship and secure communications technology, advocacy, digital safety, and research.

The U.S. government started funding internet freedom activities in the early 2000s, mostly initially focused on helping people bypass firewalls in countries such as China and Iran. In 2008, the Department of State launched its Internet Freedom program, funding internet freedom as a part of its global human rights agenda, with the goal of "ensur[ing] that any child, born anywhere in the world, has access to the global Internet as an open platform on which to innovate, learn, organize, and express herself free from undue interference or censorship."

Between 2008 and 2010, the DRL gave out $15 million to fund the development of new tools aimed at supporting freedom of expression by enabling the circumvention of politically motivated censorship and technological barriers to secure person-to-person communications.

In January 2010, in a speech at the Newseum, then-U.S. Secretary of State Hillary Clinton announced new foreign policy promoting and supporting internet freedom.

In 2014, the program offered up to $2.5 million in funding. In 2015, the program again offered up to $2.5 million in funding.
