= Internet in Thailand =

Thailand's connection to the Internet began in 1987 via the Australian Research and Education Network using UUCP and SUNIII which transformed to full TCP/IP in 1992 to UUNET. This marked Thailand as an early participant in bringing the Internet to Asia.

As of 2021, Thailand has made significant progress, with an 85% internet penetration rate and according to Ookla's insight in November 2022, Thailand ranked the fourth in the world for the fastest fixed broadband internet, with the median download speed of 205.63 Mbps. This places Thailand right behind Chile, China, and Singapore.

By 2023, the internet penetration rate brought notable changes to Thailand's approach to news and media. The Reuters Institute for the Study of Journalism reported a shift towards digital media as a key source for political news and discussions. Newer media outlets started to challenge traditional news reporting, altering long-standing journalistic practices. This change is reflected in the growing preference for getting news from online platforms such as Facebook, YouTube, and TikTok.

The majority of broadband internet access uses Asymmetric Digital Subscriber Line (ADSL) and VDSL. Some areas are covered by cable modems (using Docsis), G.shdsl and fibre to the home (FTTH). Consumer broadband internet bandwidth ranges from 10 Mbit/s to 300 Mbit/s (Up to 1 Gbit/s in Bangkok, Chiang Mai, Pattaya, Phuket). Medium and large businesses use leased lines or Ethernet Internet/MPLS where fiber optic cables link many office buildings in the central business district areas such as Bangkok's Sukhumvit, Silom, and Sathorn areas to the Thailand internet backbone.

A 3G UMTS/HSDPA network was launched in Bangkok and vicinity in December 2009 with speeds up to 7.2 Mbit/s on the 2100 MHz band. In late-2011, Telephone Organization of Thailand released 3G on HSPA+ technology covering all areas in Bangkok with speeds up to 42 Mbit/s. Major mobile network operators in Thailand also have released their 3G services at around the same time on the 850 MHz and 900 MHz bands with the same technology and connection speed. FTTH with speeds up to 1 Gbit/s is available in limited areas in major cities, including Bangkok, Phuket, and Chiang Mai. 5G Cellular services were offered by AIS and True Move starting in 2020.

Thailand saw a rapid growth in the number of broadband users in 2005 with the initiation of unmetered broadband in 2004. There are 3,399,000 (2012) internet hosts in Thailand, the highest in Southeast Asia.

A 2013 study found that Thais spend an average of 16 hours on the internet per week.

== Internet domain names ==
- Country code top-level Domain (ccTLD): .th
  - Second Level Domains
    - .ac for academic institutions
    - .co for commercial companies
    - .in for individuals or any others (from 2002)
    - .go for governmental organizations
    - .mi for military organizations
    - .or for registered non-profit organizations
    - .net for officially registered internet service providers

== Internet backbones ==
=== International and domestic bandwidth ===
Month/Year	International Bandwidth (Gbit/s)	Domestic Bandwidth (Gbit/s)
09/2021	16,590	9,924
04/2020	12,318	8,666
08/2019	9,377	7,629
05/2018	6,628	5,870
08/2017	4,750	4,358
08/2016	3,144	3,794
08/2015	1,954	2,768
08/2014	1,008	1,833
08/2013	640	1,300
08/2012	407	1,021
08/2010	158	721
12/2009	104	619
12/2008	55	251
12/2007	22	157
12/2006	10	54
12/2005	7	29
12/2004	3	21
12/2003	2	10
12/2002	1	2
12/2001	0.6	1.089
12/2000	0.25	0.58

As of April 2020, Thailand had 12,317,648 Mbit/s international bandwidth and 8,666,005 Mbit/s domestic bandwidth.

Demand for international bandwidth has increased dramatically due to the popularity of social networking services such as YouTube, Twitter, Facebook and increased number of broadband internet subscribers.

=== International gateways (IP transit) ===
There are 10 international internet gateway operators in Thailand.

Code	Name	Operator
BBConnect-IIG	BB Connect Internet Gateway	BB Connect
CAT-IIG	International Internet Gateway	CAT Telecom
CSL-IIG	CS Loxinfo International Internet Gateway	CS Loxinfo
DTAC-IIG	Total Access Communication International Internet Gateway	Dtac
JASTEL-IIG	JasTel International Internet Gateway	Jastel
Symphony-IIG	Symphony International Internet Gateway	Symphony Communication
AWN-IIG	AWN International Internet Gateway	Advanced Wireless Network
TCCT-IIG	TCCT International Internet Gateway	TCC Technology
TIG-IIG	True International Internet Gateway	True Internet
TOT-IIG	TOT International Internet Gateway	TOT

True Corporation and Shin Corporation were granted Type II International Internet Gateway and Internet Exchange Service Licenses from the NTC (National Telecommunication Committee) in 2005. CAT Telecom holds the largest share of the market.

=== Domestic Internet eXchange ===
There are 11 domestic Internet exchange points in Thailand.

- Advance Datanetwork Communication National Internet Exchange (ADC-NIX)
- BB Connect National Internet Exchange by BB Connect (BBConnect-NIX)
- CS Loxinfo National Internet Exchange (CSL-NIX)
- Symphony National Internet Exchange (Symphony-NIX)
- Super Broadband Network (SBN) Internet Exchange (SBN-NIX)
- TCCT National Internet Exchange by TCC Technology (TCCT-NIX)
- TOT National Internet Exchange by TOT (TOT-NIX)
- True Internet Gateway National Internet Exchange (TIG-NIX)
- JasTel National Internet Exchange (JASTEL-NIX)
- NECTEC IIR Public Internet Exchange (PIE, Research Only)

=== Internet eXchange point ===
- Thailand Internet Exchange or Thailand IX (Also Known As: CAT-NIX)
- Symphony Internet Exchange (SYMC-IX)
- Bangkok Neutral Internet eXchange (BKNIX)
- BBIX Thailand

Before 2003, IIR Public Internet Exchange was the largest internet exchange point in Thailand. As of August 2003, it is mandatory for all ISPs to have a presence in the National Internet Exchange (CAT-NIX) operated by CAT Telecom. CAT-NIX, TIG-NIX, TOT-NIX and TTGN-NIX are primary internet exchanges used by commercial internet service providers. Later, CAT-NIX rebranded itself to Thailand IX and invited international internet players to join its IX. Currently, Thailand IX is the largest internet eXchange point in Thailand with more than 250 Gbit/s bandwidth. Links between different internet exchanges are now set up, reducing domestic bandwidth costs.

The IIR Public Internet Exchange is now maintained by NECTEC and is used only for academic and research purposes. The only commercial internet service provider connected to the IIR Public Internet Exchange is Internet Thailand.

== Internet service providers ==
Rights to operate as an internet service provider in Thailand are granted by the NTC (National Telecommunications Council).

Most broadband internet access in Thailand is offered via ADSL technology. Before 2002, broadband internet access was offered at more than 25,000 baht per month for a typical speed of 256 kbit/s. In 2002, TOT sparked a low-cost broadband internet war that caused rapid growth in broadband internet demands and has changed the way all the ISPs operate. With a ground-breaking price for an unlimited 256 kbit/s, TOT gained popularity among online gamers in Thailand. However, TOT was unable to provide services to the majority of people in Bangkok due to the fact that half of the fixed line telephone system was operated by Telecom Asia Co., Ltd (now known as True Corporation) under a concession. At the same time, Asia InfoNet started its own ADSL service with a "free online game airtime" strategy since they also operate Ragnarok Online, the most famous online game at that time. Outside of Bangkok, TT&T teamed up with CAT Telecom to provide unlimited 2 Mbit/s ADSL service after three months of operation.

It is commonly believed that the popularity of online gaming at that time sparked the demand for broadband internet in Thailand.

Most broadband internet users in Thailand complain about the ISPs not being able to provide the speeds they promised. Many internet service providers have high contention ratios on home ADSL packages, sometimes up to 1:50. There was also limited international bandwidth due to CAT Telecom being the sole provider of an international internet gateway, but this has improved since the liberalization of internet gateway operations in 2005. At that time, most ISPs focused on expanding their domestic connections to accommodate online gaming demands. This led to a comeback of premium ADSL packages at a higher price for premium home users and corporate customers. Many users still argue that these packages will still not improve the international bandwidth availability for home users. Internet service providers are usually also criticized for throttling BitTorrent traffic.

Recently, there were dramatic increases in international bandwidth after the NTC authorized more ISPs to set up their own international internet gateways to cope with the growth in demand for contents requiring higher bandwidth.

In early-2009, Jasmine International launched ADSL services under the "3BB" brand in major cities offering speeds up to 3 Mbit/s for 590 baht. This prompted True Internet to expand their services to 8 Mbit/s from 5 Mbit/s and match 3BB prices.

In mid-2009, 3BB offered minimum speed 4 Mbit/s for 590 baht and expanded their services from 8 Mbit/s to 10 Mbit/s 1,490 baht per month, prompting True Internet to temporarily offer free upgrades for current 8 Mbit/s users to 12 Mbit/s. All of Maxnet's customers were also transferred to 3BB as part of the TT&T debt rehabilitation plan proposed by the debt holders. As of October 2009, True offers speeds up to 16 Mbit/s.

TOT and ADC have a local loop unbundling agreement allowing for ADC to provide ADSL services on TOT phone lines. Since most telephone wires in major cities are still on poles and not underground, there is no limit to how many phone lines can enter a building. This has prompted many ISPs to offer DSL services without phone service. A new wire is simply run to the premises requiring the service, bypassing the need for any further local loop unbundling agreements.

Despite the improvement of the internet in Thailand, there are still network issues, mostly concerning network latency. The delay on the network itself proved to be deleterious to competitive online gaming. Players claimed to have network issues which lost them games.

=== Wired ===
ISP Name	Technology	Speed	Additional information
AIS Fibre (now known as AIS-3BB Fibre 3)	VDSL2, FTTH, Leased Line	Up to 2 Gbit/s	10 million FTTH homepass in 2016
True Internet	ADSL2+, VDSL2, Cable Modem, G.shdsl/SDSL, Leased Line, MPLS, FTTH	Up to 2 Gbit/s	True uses both CAT IIG and its own international gateway. Also True usually bundle their internet package with cable TV by TrueVisions and mobile cellular data by TrueMove H.
3BB (AIS) (now known as AIS-3BB Fibre 3)	ADSL2+ (Converted to VDSL), VDSL2, Leased Line, FTTH(Currently available in some areas)	Up to 1 Gbit/s,	3BB offers FTTH at 1 Gbit/s. Jasmine International used to be joint with TT&T and operated under the name "Maxnet". Now operates under the name "3BB". (Three Broadband). A 99.87% stake in 3BB was purchased by AIS for $908million in November 2023.
TOT	ADSL2+, Leased Line, FTTH(Available in some areas)	Up to 1 Gbit/s	TOT offers FTTH in Bangkok with speeds up to 1 Gbit/s. TOT is expanding their broadband internet services in provincial areas where it owns almost all fixed line telephone infrastructure.
CAT Telecom	ADSL, G.shdsl/SDSL, Cable, Leased Line, FTTH	4 Mbit/s, 10 Mbit/s, 50 Mbit/s, 100 Mbit/s, 1 Gbit/s	It has teamed up with some local cable television providers to provide broadband via cable up to 10 Mbit/s.
KSC Internet	Dial-up, ADSL, Leased Line		owned by True Corporation but branded for the upper-end market. Founded in 1994 as a joint venture between Internet Knowledge Center Co., Ltd. (IKSC) and the Communications Authority of Thailand (CAT), KSC was the first commercial Internet service provider (ISP) in Thailand.
CS Loxinfo	Dial-up, ADSL, Leased Line, Fiber, MPLS	Up to 1 Gbit/s	Part of InTouch Group. Corporate-customer focused with SME broadband options. Services cover Bangkok and provincial areas. Bangkok downtown area customers are also offered high-speed CSL-Symphony Gigabit Ring access options.
KIRZ	IPLC, Leased Line, Metro Ethernet, FTTx	10 Mbit/s, 100 Mbit/s, 1 Gbit/s, 10 Gbit/s	KIRZ offer a variety of services to customers through our data centers and over our fiber-optic networks, including video, high-speed internet, advanced voice and KIRZ Secure digital protection solutions. Working with partners, KIRZ Business Edge offers communications solutions to small, medium, and large businesses.
TT&T	ADSL		TT&T no longer operates as an ISP due to the company's recent restructuring and debt rehabilitation plan. All of the previous TT&T and Maxnet Internet customers were transferred to 3BB.
Buddy Broadband	ADSL		Operated by Advance Datanetwork Communications (ADC), part of Shin Corporation telecommunications conglomerate. Buddy Broadband (commonly known as BuddyBB) offers internet access only through ADSL technology. Unlike other ISPs, BuddyBB has integrated its Internet service with IPTV service. The other difference is that BuddyBB has only the connection speed of 2 Mbit/s but with only 256 kbit/s for international connections for its cheapest package. Higher-end packages have higher international connection speeds. Full BuddyBB service with IPTV is only available in Bangkok and nearby provinces, however, it operates its ADSL Internet service in major cities such as Chiang Mai and Phuket with different packages and pricing through resellers. As of January 2012, they offer speeds up to 8 Mbit/s in Bangkok and Chiang Mai.
Internet Thailand	Dial-up, ADSL, Leased Line		First commercial ISP in Thailand
Pacnet	Dial-up, ADSL, G.shdsl/SDSL, Leased Line, Ethernet		Focuses on corporate customers
Jasmine Internet	Dial-up, ADSL, Leased Line		Not to be confused with Jasmine International
ISSP	Dial-up, ADSL, Leased Line		
Samart	Dial-up, ADSL, G.shdsl/SDSL, Leased Line		
A-Net	Dial-up, ADSL, Leased Line		
Otaro/InterNetwork	Dial-up, ADSL, Leased Line		
Proen Internet	Dial-up, ADSL, Leased Line		
Far East Internet			
Reach Thailand			
Sanuk Systems	FTTH, ADSL	100 Mbit/s	Focuses on hospitality, resorts and hotels, expat communities and condominiums in tourist areas.
Chomanan Worldnet			
KIRZ Internet			
Thai-Fi	G.shdsl/SDSL, Leased Line, Cable	4 Mbit/s, 5 Mbit/s, 8 Mbit/s, 10 Mbit/s, 12 Mbit/s, 16Mbit/s	Thai-Fi is the registered trademark of JCMR Co., Ltd., a Thai company founded in 2003 by US and Thai citizens which provides wireless network design, installation, configuration, security, and maintenance to apartment, condominium, and office buildings, offices, hotels, cafes, restaurants, individual residences and businesses using 802.11 technology.
WorldWeb			
Beenets/UIH			
Milcom			
Loxley			
ISPIO (NIPA)			
TCC Technology	Fiber, MPLS, Leased Line		
NTT			

=== Wireless ===
ISP Name	Technology	Speed	Additional information
Advance Info Service (AIS)	UMTS/HSDPA/HSPA/HSPA+ 3.9G, 4G LTE/ LTE-A	Up to 42 Mbit/s, 4G Up to 400 Mbit/s	HSPA+ is currently operated on the 2100 MHz band. AIS Won 4G 1800 MHz 4G LTE is currently operated on the 1800 MHz, LTE Advance Run On 1800 MHz/2100 MHz/900 MHz
CAT Telecom	3G UMTS/HSDPA/HSPA/HSPA+ 3.9G	Up to 42 Mbit/s	Coverage is 76 provinces on the 850 MHz band.
DTAC	GPRS, EDGE, UMTS/HSDPA/HSPA/HSPA+/LTE 3.9G 4G	Up to 42 Mbit/s, 4G Up to 126 Mbit/s	Mobile Internet services recently underwent heavy rebranding as 'DTAC Internet'. UMTS/HSDPA 3.9G is available nationwide on the 850 MHz and 2100 MHz band. Currently, LTE is available in Bangkok metropolitan area utilizing 1800 MHz / 2100 MHz band.
i-Kool 3G	HSDPA 3.5G	Up to 7.2 Mbit/s	UMTS/HSDPA 3.5G coverage is Bangkok and vicinity on the 2100 MHz band. Currently offering 3G services on TOT 3G's network. The network is run and operated by Loxley.
Mojo 3G	HSDPA 3.5G	Up to 7.2 Mbit/s	UMTS/HSDPA 3.5G coverage is Bangkok and vicinity on the 2100 MHz band. Currently offering 3G services on TOT 3G's network. The network is run and operated by Mconzult.
TOT	UMTS/HSDPA/HSPA/HSPA+ 3.9G, Wi-Fi	Up to 42 Mbit/s	UMTS/HSDPA 3.9G coverage is Bangkok and vicinity on the 2100 MHz band
TrueMove	GPRS, EDGE	Up to 256 kbit/s	True has the largest coverage of over 15,000 Wi-Fi hotspots in Bangkok. This boost has been coupled with the Bangkok Green Wifi project, covering many outdoor areas on main roads.
RealMove/Truemove H Universal Communication (TrueMove-H)	UMTS/HSDPA/HSPA/HSPA+ 3.9G 4G LTE/ LTE-A, Wi-Fi	Up to 42 Mbit/s, LTE Up to 150 Mbit/s, LTE Advance Up to 225 Mbit/s.	True is the first 4G mobile operator in Thailand Truemove H Won 900 MHz and 1800 MHz 4G LTE is currently operated on the 2100 MHz 4G 900 MHz and 1800 MHz is planned
168 3G	3G UMTS/HSDPA/HSPA/HSPA+ 3.9G	Up to 42 Mbit/s	UMTS/HSDPA 3.5G coverage is 77 provinces on the 850 MHz band. Currently offering 3G services on CAT 3G's network.

Note: For 3G, only CAT, Hutch, TOT and its MVNOs are considered as legally commercial service. In 2012, the National Broadcasting and Telecommunications Commission (NBTC) held an auction and approved 2100 MHz licenses to three operators (Advanced Wireless Network of Advanced Info Service (AIS), DTAC Network of Total Access Communication (DTAC), and Real Future of True Corp) and 3G service under 2100 MHz is expected to operate by Q2 of 2013.

== Internet data centers ==
This section lists the commercial internet data centers (IDC) in Thailand.

Name	Address	City
CAT Internet Data Center (Bangkok)	CAT Telecom Tower, Charoen Krung Road	Bangkok
CAT Internet Data Center (Chiang Mai)	CAT Customer Service Center	Chiang Mai
CAT Internet Data Center (Khon Kaen)	CAT Customer Service Center	Khon Kaen
CAT Internet Data Center (Phuket)	CAT Customer Service Center	Phuket
CSLoxinfo Internet Data Center	CAT Telecom Tower, Charoen Krung Road	Bangkok
CSLoxinfo Internet Data Center	Cyber World Tower (4th floor), Ratchadaphisek Road (MRT : Cultural Center)	Bangkok
CSLoxinfo Internet Data Center	The Cloud Building, Ratchada-Ramindhra Road (Ready for service : May 2014)	Bangkok
Internet Thailand Public Company Limited	Thai Summit Tower (10th floor) on New Petchaburi Road	Bangkok
ISSP Internet Data Center	CAT Telecom Tower, Charoen Krung Road	Bangkok
ISPIO (NIPA) Internet Data Center	CAT Telecom Tower (4th floor)	Bangkok
KIRZ Data Center	Queen Sirikit National Convention Center	Bangkok
Nettree Internet Data Center	CAT Telecom Tower (4th floor), Charoen Krung Road	Bangkok
Pacnet Data Center	CAT Telecom Tower (20th floor), Charoen Krung Road	Bangkok
SiamIDC	CAT Telecom Tower (4th floor)	Bangkok
SUPERNAP (Thailand)	SUPERNAP (Thailand)	Chonburi
ST Telemedia Global Data Centres (Thailand)	STT GDC Thailand	Bangkok
TCC Technology Internet Data Center (Amata Nakorn)	Amata Service Center, Bangna-Trad Road	Chonburi
TCC Technology Internet Data Center (Bangna)	TCIF Tower, Bangna-Trad Road	Bangkok
TCC Technology Internet Data Center (Empire Tower)	Empire Tower, Sathorn Road	Bangkok
TOT Internet Data Center (Chaengwattana)	TOT headquarter, Chaengwattana Road	Bangkok
TOT Internet Data Center (Krung Kasem)	TOT Central Office, Krung Kasem Road	Bangkok
TOT Internet Data Center (Laem Chabang)	TOT Central Office	Chonburi
TOT Internet Data Center (Hat Yai)	TOT Central Office	Songkhla
True Internet Data Center (True Tower)	True Tower, Ratchadaphisek Road	Bangkok
True Internet Data Center (MTG)	Muang Thong Thani	Pathum Thani
Win Internetwork (By Proen Internet)/OTARO Gigabit Data Center	CAT Telecom Tower (4th floor)	Bangkok

== Internet censorship ==
Thailand is on Reporters Without Borders list of countries under surveillance in 2011. Thailand's Internet Freedom status is rated "Not Free" in the Freedom on the Net 2011 report by Freedom House, which cites substantial political censorship and the arrests of bloggers and other online users.

The national constitution provides for freedom of thought, speech and press "under many conditions" but the government seriously restricts these rights. The lèse-majesté law criminalizes expression insulting the Thai king, punishable by fifteen years' imprisonment.

Estimates put the number of websites blocked at over 110,000 and growing in 2010. It is estimated that the Thai government spends 1.7 million baht per day on digital surveillance.

=== Single Internet gateway ===
The cabinet under Gen Prayut Chan-o-cha, the junta leader and prime minister, on 30 June 2015 gave a green light to Thailand's Ministry of Information and Communication Technology (MICT) and relevant agencies to move forward with plans to implement a Thai single gateway internet before the end of the 2015 fiscal budget. The plan to reduce internet gateways was initially proposed by Pol Gen Somyot Poompanmoung, the chief of the Royal Thai Police, as a single gateway system makes it easier for state authorities to monitor, filter, delete, and intercept information on the internet that the authorities deem inappropriate. Currently (2015), there are about 10 international internet gateway operators in Thailand. The MICT has been ordered to report the progress on the plan to the cabinet before the end of September 2015.

Critics point out that from a "...systems point of view, having a single gateway and a single point of failure is a bad idea." They go on to say that, "The people of Thailand can kiss a fast internet goodbye purely from technical incompetence, not to mention all the monitoring, censoring and deep packet inspection the military want. Would VPN and encryption be outlawed? That would be a logical next step."

On 30 September 2015, Thai netizens expressed their opposition to the single gateway plan by launching DDoS attacks against government websites, thereby bringing the websites down for hours. Those who joined the attacks referred to their action as a civil disobedience. But they were threatened with years in jail by Thai police. Hundreds of thousands of people have also signed a petition against the single gateway plan. Despite heavy opposition, Thai authorities said they still push ahead with the plan.

== Internet surveillance ==
According to the NGO Privacy International in a September 2016 report, "The Thai military government has counted on its police force to monitor online speech in order to curb dissent. But beyond the police force itself, the ruling military government has empowered networks of citizens whom it encourages to denounce those who post online content considered contrary to government policies." Following the May 2014 coup led by General Prayut, there was a sharp increase in online surveillance carried out by the National Council for Peace and Order (NCPO), the ruling junta. An updated Computer Crime Act in 2014 gave police broad powers to monitor online commentary, particularly social networking applications such as Facebook. In the two years since the coup, 527 people have been arrested, 167 tried in military court, and 68 charged with lèse-majesté. Conviction on a charge of lèse-majesté can carry a jail sentence of up to 15 years. Of the 68 cases in which people have been charged, 21 involved content posted on Facebook.

The "Cyber Scout" program was originally established in 2010 by the Thai Ministry of Justice and the Ministry of Information and Communication Technology (MICT)—since renamed the Ministry of Digital Economy and Society. The program became moribund shortly thereafter, but was revived by the NCPO following their coup d'etat. The aim of the Cyber Scouts is to encourage the "ethical and responsible use of information and communication technology" among youngsters and to create a network of young volunteers to monitor online content that could be deemed a threat to national security and the monarchy.

In December 2016, the junta-appointed Thai National Legislative Assembly (NLA) passed an amendment to the 2007 Computer Crime Act that has been called, "...a grab bag of the worst provisions of the worst internet laws in the world, bits of the UK's Snooper's Charter, America's Computer Fraud and Abuse Act, and the dregs of many other failed laws." Thai officials claim the changes protect people's rights from being violated on social and digital media while enhancing the digital economy. In a Bangkok Post editorial urging that the NLA reject the amendment, it noted that, "When the government first set out to revise the Computer Crime Act last year, it pledged that the change will not violate people's rights and freedoms. The resulting draft amendment shows anything but an attempt to maintain the promise. The NLA must vote it down." It passed unanimously.

== See also ==
- Internet censorship in Thailand
- Mass media in Thailand
- Telecommunications in Thailand
- Internet rush hour
- Thaimail
