= Cute cat theory of digital activism =

Activist uses of the Internet aided and protected by self-interested functions

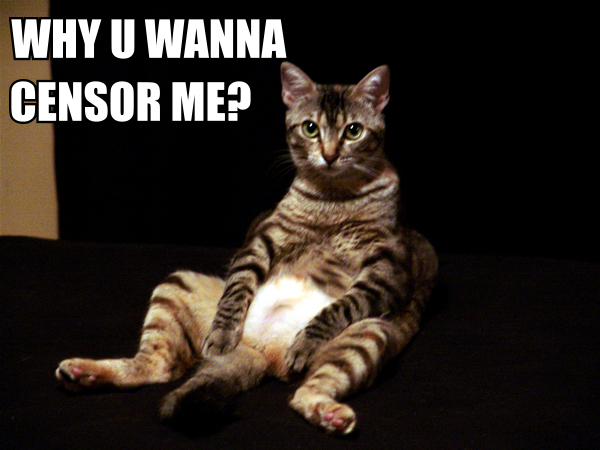
Lolcat images were often shared through the same networks used by online activists.

The cute cat theory of digital activism is a theory concerning Internet activism, Web censorship, and "cute cats" (a term used for any low-value, but popular online activity) developed by Ethan Zuckerman in 2008. It posits that most people are not interested in activism; instead, they want to use the web for mundane activities, including surfing for pornography and lolcats ("cute cats"). The tools that they develop for that (such as Facebook, Flickr, Blogger, Twitter, and similar platforms) are very useful to social movement activists because they may lack resources to develop dedicated tools themselves. This, in turn, makes the activists more immune to reprisals by governments than if they were using a dedicated activism platform, because shutting down a popular public platform provokes a larger public outcry than shutting down an obscure one.

== The Internet and censorship ==
Zuckerman states that "Web 1.0 was invented to allow physicists to share research papers. Web 2.0 was created to allow people to share pictures of cute cats." Zuckerman says that if a tool has "cute cat" purposes, and is widely used for low-value purposes, it can be and likely is used for online activism, too.

Online activism is a key tool to advocate a change whether it be political, environmental, or overall beneficial to society. With this idea of censorship of Web 2.0, Zuckerman believes that political capital should be spent. In other words, for whoever wants to censor a certain piece of content, it should cost them a bit of their reputation so that they must confront the backlash and loss of support.

If the government chooses to shut down such generic tools, it will reduce people's ability to "look at cute cats online", spreading dissent and encouraging the activists' cause.

When the government limits media, it impacts a much larger number of citizens than those who are politically active. This means those who do not care about politics are as Zuckerman says, “made aware that their government fears online speech so much that they’re willing to censor the millions of banal videos on DailyMotion to block a few political ones.”

== Chinese model ==
According to Zuckerman, internet censorship in the People's Republic of China, which relies on its own, self-censored, Web 2.0 sites, is able to circumvent the cute-cat problem because the government is able to provide people with access to cute-cat content on domestic, self-censored sites while blocking access to Western sites, which are less popular in China than in many other places worldwide.

"Sufficiently usable read/write platforms will attract porn and activists. If there's no porn, the tool doesn't work. If there are no activists, it doesn't work well," Zuckerman has stated.

== See also ==
- Arab Spring
- Bread and circuses
- Cats and the Internet
- Collateral freedom
- Digital utopianism
- Twitter Revolution
