= Proxify =

If you are looking for Proxify (Company)

Proxify is a partly free, single-serving website that enables users to communicate more anonymously on the Internet. An example of this is to have Proxify use an SSH tunnel, already created and listening in on the localhost. This can be done using PuTTy to dynamically listen in to the host and redirecting traffic through the tunnel. Proxify is then used to hook applications into using the tunnel without configuring the different applications itself.

Proxify matches its registration information with a WHOIS database, as reassurance. There are three general pre-configured options (max speed, max security, or compatibility) with users able to tweak the settings otherwise.

Although free searches are offered, a message may appear: "Proxify is experiencing higher than normal traffic volume. We must restrict access to our free service during peak usage times to ensure the best possible experience for paid subscribers. Please login to your account or signup for immediate access."

Because it uses the HTTPS protocol, it can be considered to be secure to eavesdropping and man-in-the-middle attacks, but it has the disadvantage of requiring the users to connect to particular IP addresses, making it fairly easy to block by almost any firewall.

== See also ==
- Internet censorship circumvention
