= Wipas Raksakulthai =

Thai businessman (born 1973)

- Born: c. 1973
- Occupation: businessman
- Known for: 2010 arrest for lèse majesté

Wipas Raksakulthai (Thai: วิภาส รักสกุลไทย; born c. 1973) is a Thai businessman currently serving a sentence for lèse majesté following a Facebook post to his account perceived to criticize King Bhumibol. Wipas has been named a prisoner of conscience by Amnesty International.

Wipas is a Thai "Red Shirt", a supporter of the United Front for Democracy Against Dictatorship, the movement loosely affiliated with deposed prime minister Thaksin Shinawatra. On 29 April 2010, he was arrested at his home in Rayong Province by the Department of Special Investigation on charges of lèse majesté, following a Facebook post to his account allegedly criticizing the king. He was 37 years old at the time of his arrest. Wipas denied that he had made the post, stating that his account had been hacked. In May 2011, The Nation quoted a "reliable source" as saying that Wipas had been released on bail, but was trying to avoid further news coverage.

The Bangkok Post reported that this was thought to be the first lèse majesté charge against a Thai Facebook user. A media reform activist described the case as escalating "the climate of fear among [Thai] internet users" and stated that "now many people refrain from revealing their real identities on Facebook."

In its 2011 Annual Report, Amnesty International criticized the arrest, expressing its concern that "[Thai] freedom of expression is being curbed through the use of the emergency decree, the lese majeste law and the Computer Crime Act." The organization named Wipas a prisoner of conscience, apparently the first in several decades. An advisor to Amnesty International said he was uncertain why Wipas had been classified as a prisoner conscience while the possibly hundreds of other citizens detained under the lese majeste law had not.

== See also ==
- Internet censorship in Thailand
