= Lantern (software) =

Internet censorship circumvention software

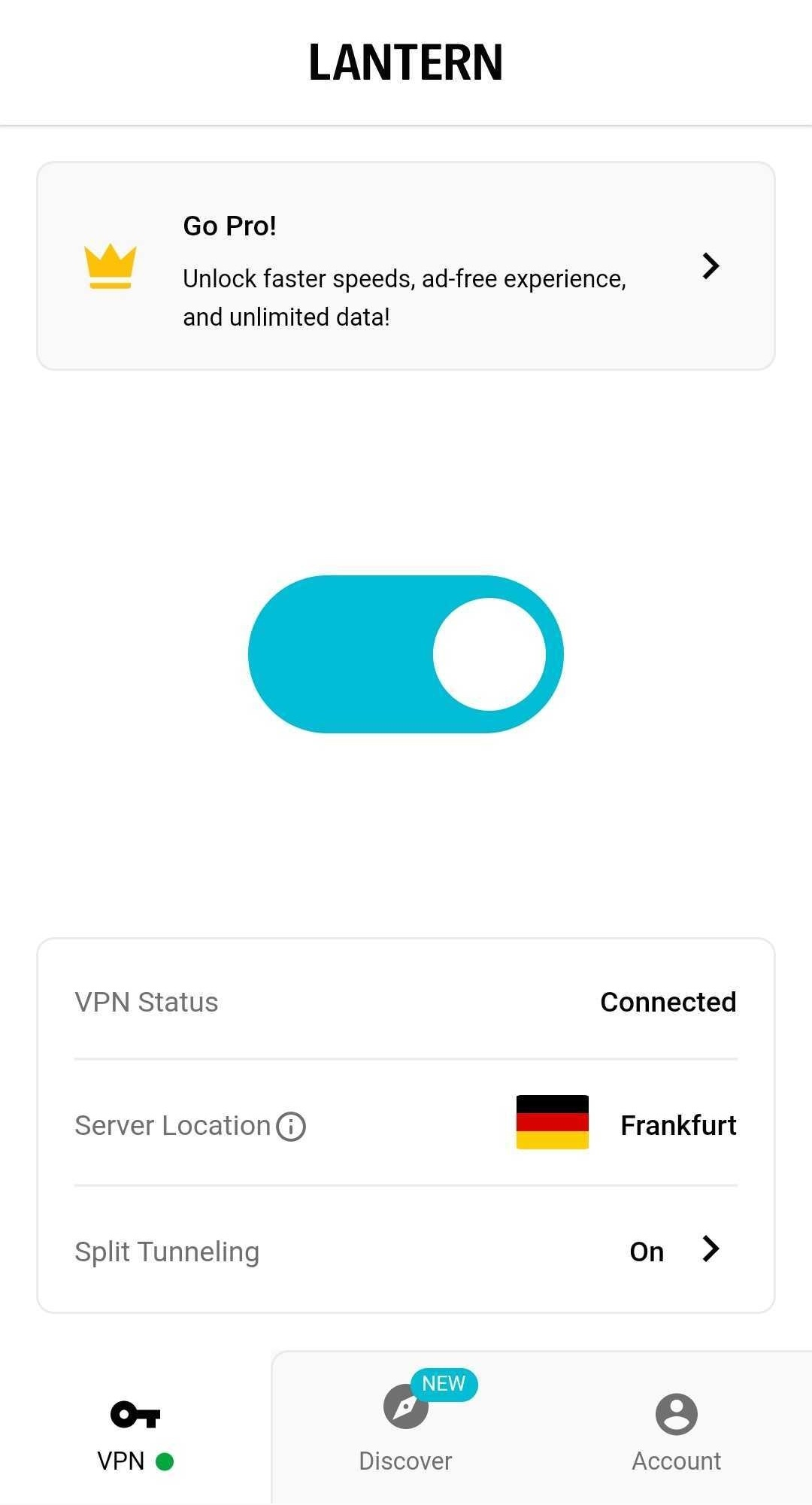
- Lantern 7.7.1 on Android screenshot
- Original author: Adam Fisk
- Stable release: 8.2.6 / 28 May 2025; 16 months ago
- Written in: Go
- Operating system: Linux, OS X, Windows, Android
- Type: Internet censorship circumvention
- License: Apache License 2.0
- Website: lantern.io
- Repository: github.com/getlantern

Lantern is a free and open source internet censorship circumvention tool that operates in some of the most extreme censorship environments, such as China, Iran, and Russia. It was used by millions of Iranians during the Mahsa Amini protests in Iran in 2022 and again during the surge in censorship in Russia following the Russian invasion of Ukraine. Lantern uses a wide variety of protocols and techniques that obfuscate network traffic and/or co-mingle traffic with protocols censors are reluctant to block, often hiding in protocols such as TLS. It also uses domain fronting. It is not an anonymity tool like Tor.

Lantern was developed in 2010 and is maintained by Brave New Software Project, a 501(c)(3) nonprofit incorporated in 2010 and granted tax-exempt status by the IRS in 2014. Lantern is Brave New Software's sole product. Lantern has been funded largely by the U.S. government, including the State Department and the Open Technology Fund, a government-funded nonprofit. According to its audited financial statements, federal grants made up the majority of Brave New Software's revenue in each year from 2020 to 2024.

Early versions of Lantern allowed users in countries having free internet access to share their internet connection with those who are in countries where the network is partly blocked. Network connections will be dispersed between multiple computers running Lantern so it will not put undue stress on a single connection or computer. Newer versions of Lantern again use this technique via browser-based proxies and Lantern's Unbounded software.

Lantern's CEO and lead developer is Adam Fisk, the former lead engineer of LimeWire.

== History ==
In early versions, Lantern's framework required the use of Google Talk for users to invite other trusted users from their Google Talk contacts. Lantern has won awards from the US Department of State to support internet freedom. This has raised some concerns about the privacy of users, though Fisk has said the State Department is "incredibly hands off" and never dictates how they should write Lantern, or how they should talk about it.

In early December 2013, Lantern had a surge of Chinese users and grew from 200 users to 10,000 users in just two weeks. Soon after that, the network was almost blocked by the Chinese government. Another surge occurred after the 2022 Russian invasion of Ukraine when internet freedoms in Russia were severely curtailed.

Lantern is hosted on a wide variety and continually changing set of data centers around the world. It has used Digital Ocean at times, which was briefly reported as blocked in Iran during the civil unrest on January 2, 2018. Users are not required to connect by invite since version 2.0 was released in 2015.

== Funding ==
The software received US$2.2 million (HK$17.1 million) in seed funding from the US State Department, reported in 2013. In April 2024, the Open Technology Fund (OTF) announced increased long-term funding for several Internet circumvention tools, including Lantern, to help sustain access for millions of monthly users in China, Iran, and Russia. Subsequent OTF awards to Lantern totaled US$3.94 million in 2024 and US$444,000 in 2025, primarily to support mobile peer-to-peer enhancements and bandwidth costs for non-monetized users in high-censorship regions.

== Privacy policy ==
Per Lantern's privacy policy document on their website

Lantern servers do not and will never log:

- Linking Lantern account to real identity (such as purchase information)
- Connection logs (time stamps of connection of IP addresses from client to Lantern server)
- Browsing history
- Traffic destination or metadata
- DNS queries

Lantern collects as little information about their customers as possible in order to run their service:

Our guiding principle toward data collection is to collect only the minimal data required to operate a world-class service at scale. We designed our systems to not have sensitive data about our customers; even when compelled, we cannot provide data that we do not possess.

== Related events ==
At the beginning of 2019, it was reported that the Guangdong police had imposed penalties on the basis of the "Interim Provisions on the Administration of the International Network of Computer Information Network of the People's Republic of China" for a Lantern user to "create and use illegal channels for international networking." The fine is a thousand Yuan. The document of the punishment was publicized on the "Guangdong Public Security Law Enforcement Information Disclosure Platform".

In March 2022 it was reported that Russian users were employing Lantern to bypass censorship measures put in place by the Russian government.

In January 2026 Iran International reported that Lantern (in its unbounded mode) was seeing use in Iran in the aftermath of the 2026 Iran protests, albeit with limited success.

== See also ==
- Hola (VPN) - P2P VPN
- Psiphon
- Haystack (software)
- Outline VPN
- Tor (network)
