= Telex (anti-censorship system) =

Telex is a research anti-censorship system that would allow users to circumvent a censor without alerting the censor to the act of circumvention. It is not ready for real users, but a proof-of-concept mock system exists. As of 2018, Telex has evolved into refraction networking.

== Purpose ==
Telex complements services like Tor (anonymity network) by placing Telex stations in the network infrastructure of free countries. A client can create a TLS tunnel that is indistinguishable from allowed traffic. That way, firewalls in censored countries are neither able to detect nor block access to specific parts of the Internet, assuming they allow access at all.

== See also ==
- Domain fronting
