= Flash proxy =

Flash proxy is a pluggable transport and proxy which runs in a web browser. Flash proxies are an Internet censorship circumvention tool which enables users to connect to the Tor anonymity network (amongst others) via a plethora of ephemeral browser-based proxy relays. The essential idea is that the IP addresses contingently used are changed faster than a censoring agency can detect, track, and block them. The Tor traffic is wrapped in a WebSocket format and disguised with an XOR cipher.

== Implementation ==
A free software implementation of flash proxies is available. It uses JavaScript, WebSocket, and a Python implementation of the obfsproxy protocol, and was crafted in the Research Project in Computer Security course at Stanford University in 2011. This work was supported by the Defense Advanced Research Project Agency (DARPA) and the Space and Naval Warfare Systems Center Pacific under Contract No. N66001-11-C-4022.

== See also ==
- Crypto-anarchism
- Cryptocat
- CryptoParty
- Freedom of information
- Internet censorship
- Internet privacy
- Proxy server
