= Yasmin Green =

American businesswoman

- Born: Yasmin Dolatabadi; 1981 (age 44–45); Iran
- Occupation: CEO of Jigsaw (since 2022)
- Employer: Google/Alphabet, Inc.
- Known for: Redirect Method intervention to counter online radicalization; Perspective machine learning tool to track online trolls
- Spouse: Adam Green (musician)
- Website: Yasmin Green on X

Yasmin Green (née Dolatabadi) is an Iranian-born American businesswoman and the CEO of Jigsaw (formerly Google Ideas), a unit within Google that addresses threats to open societies.

She leads an interdisciplinary team that researches and develops technical solutions to a global security challenges, including violent extremism, censorship, harassment, and misinformation. Jigsaw oversees both international cybersecurity and content moderation across Google's platforms. Green was the first employee at Jigsaw hired by founder Jared Cohen.

== Early life and education ==
Green was born in Iran. She has one older brother. Her family fled to London in 1984. She grew up in England and played on the UK's national under-16 basketball team until her family moved to Sheffield, where she then played for the Sheffield women’s basketball team.

She received her B.S. in economics from University College London, an M.S. in management from the London School of Economics, and an MBA from the University of Chicago Graduate School of Business.

== Career ==
Green went on to work at a consulting firm, Booz Allen Hamilton, where she specialized in oil and gas and traveled throughout Africa and the Middle East.

She then joined Google in 2006 as head of sales strategy and operations for Southern Europe, Middle East, and Africa. Her responsibilities included deal negotiation for syndication partnerships and heading operations for Sub-saharan Africa.

Green was selected by Cohen in 2010, after Google asked him to create an in-house think tank on geopolitical challenges. It was called Google Ideas but would later become Jigsaw.

In 2015, Green and Hadiya Masieh, a British consultant for Jigsaw—in collaboration with Moonshot CVE, Quantum Communications, and the Gen Next Foundation—worked on Redirect Method, an Internet-based intervention that uses targeted advertisements to counter online radicalization. To develop the project, Jigsaw worked with researchers to analyze ISIS recruitment tactics. Then, they interviewed young people who had traveled to join ISIS and either returned or were captured. Based on the findings, Jigsaw and its partners created ads to "pique the interest" of this target audience and redirect them to Jigsaw's YouTube channel, which featured input from "credible voices" such as citizen journalists, imams, and ISIS defectors. In its first year, 300,000 people watched videos created by the Redirect Method.

In 2016, Green and the Jigsaw team were working on uProxy, a browser extension that could be used to get around firewalls in countries with restrictive internet regimes.

By 2017, Green was head of research and development (R&D) at Jigsaw, and the team shifted focus to combatting state-sponsored internet "trolls" who target journalists, activists, and independent press. The tool they created, called Perspective, uses machine learning to review comments and score them based on similarity to comments people had previously labeled as toxic. By February 2017, Jigsaw began offering developers access to an application programming interface (API) for Perspective. Jigsaw had been testing the tool with The New York Times's comment section.

Also in 2017, Cohen and Green, CEO and Director of R&D of Jigsaw, respectively, ranked 18th on Fortune's "40 Under 40" most influential young leaders list. They were both 35 years old at the time. Green was also named one of Fast Company's "Most Creative People in Business".

Green was promoted to CEO of Jigsaw in July 2022.

== Memberships and projects ==
Green assisted with research for Christian Dustmann, Francesca Fabbri, Ian Preston, and Jonathan Wadsworth's 2005 report, "The Impact of Immigration on the British Labour Market".

Her other projects include Against Violent Extremism, founded in 2011, the first online network of former extremists. She is also a member of the National Task Force On Election Crises, an initiative of the Protect Democracy project, and sits on the boards of the Anti-Defamation League the Tory Burch Foundation. From 2014 to 2015, she co-chaired the European Commission's Working Group on Online Radicalization.

She is a fellow of the Aspen Institute and a member of its Commission on Information Disorder, which was established in January 2021. Green is also a senior advisor for the Harvard Belfer Center’s Defending Digital Democracy Project, which is an Aspen Institute project, and an advisor to the University of Michigan Center for Social Media Responsibility.

In 2018, Green gave a TED Talk called "How Did The Internet Become A Platform For Hate Groups?" She has also written for the academic journal Foreign Affairs.

== Personal life ==
Green married musician and filmmaker Adam Green on July 4, 2013. They have two daughters together.

Green and her husband co-produced the film Adam Green's Aladdin (2019).
