= Ross Frenett =

Irish tech executive

- Frenett in 2026

Member of An Coimisiún Toghcháin
- Incumbent
- Assumed office 2026
- Appointed by: Catherine Connolly, President of Ireland

Personal details
- Education: University College Cork; King's College London
- Occupation: Counter-extremism specialist, technology executive
- Known for: Co-founding Moonshot

Ross Frenett is an Irish counter-extremism specialist and technology executive. He is the co-founder and chief executive officer of Moonshot, a company that uses data analytics and digital campaigns to address online harms. In 2026, he was appointed as a member of An Coimisiún Toghcháin, the Electoral Commission of Ireland.

== Early life and education ==
Frenett is from Cobh, County Cork. He studied History and Politics at University College Cork and later completed a master's degree in Security and Society at King's College London.

== Career ==
Before co-founding Moonshot, Frenett worked at the Institute for Strategic Dialogue as the director of Against Violent Extremism, a network of former extremists and survivors of violent extremism. His early work focused on the use of online platforms by extremist movements, violent dissident republicanism and female ISIS recruits.

In 2015, Frenett co-founded Moonshot with Vidhya Ramalingam. The company was founded in London and initially focused on countering violent extremism and terrorism. It later expanded its work to include disinformation, organised crime, gender-based violence, human trafficking and child exploitation.

== Electoral Commission ==
In April 2026, the Government of Ireland nominated Frenett and Lee Komito for appointment by the President as ordinary members of An Coimisiún Toghcháin. Motions recommending their appointment were agreed by both Dáil Éireann and Seanad Éireann in May 2026.
