= Outline =

Outline or outlining may refer to:

- Outline (list), a document summary, in hierarchical list format
- Code folding, a method of hiding or collapsing code or text to see content in outline form
- Outline drawing, a sketch depicting the outer edges of a person or object, without interior details or shading
- Outline typeface, in typography
- Outline VPN, a free and open-source Shadowsocks deployment tool
- Outline, the representation of a word in shorthand
- Step outline, or just outline, the first summary of a story for a film script

== Media ==
- Outline (novel), a 2014 novel by Rachel Cusk
- Outlines (collection), a 1939 collection of poems by surrealist poet Jean Venturini
- The Outline (website), a news company
- Outlines Festival, an annual one-day music festival held in Sheffield, United Kingdom
- Outline Records, record label founded by Jane Ira Bloom
- The Outline (band), an experimental band from the United States
- "Outlines" (song), by Mike Mago and Dragonette
- "Outlines", a song by All Time Low from Don't Panic

== See also ==
- Outliner, a software application for creating outlines
- Contour (disambiguation)
- Lining out
- Silhouette, an art form emphasizing the outline of the subject of the art
