= Shadowrocket =

Mobile proxy client

Shadowrocket is a proxy utility application for iOS published by Shadow Launch Technology Limited, which is typically used to circumvent the Great Firewall of China. Due to its icon, it is nicknamed Xiaohuojian (小火箭; 'little rocket'). The authors themselves do not provide any proxy servers, and users must add their own proxy servers to the app, of which a multitude of protocols are supported.

== Features ==
In terms of protocols, Shadowrocket supports a variety of protocols, including Shadowsocks, ShadowsocksR, and classic protocols such as SOCKS5. For routing, it provides configuration mode, proxy mode, direct connection mode, and scene mode.

== Incidents ==
At the end of July 2017, Apple Inc. removed dozens of VPN apps, including Shadowrocket, from its App Store in mainland China.

On July 28, 2020, the police of Jinshi City, Changde, Hunan Province announced via their WeChat public account that police had discovered a resident, surnamed Chen, had been using Shadowrocket to "access overseas networks and browse foreign pornographic websites" since February 2019. Chen's behavior was identified as "establishing an illegal channel for international networking," for which he received a formal warning.

In December 2021, police in Jinfeng District, Yinchuan discovered a person using their phone to register for and use Gmail via Shadowrocket, issuing a warning and a fine.

== Reception ==
The Central News Agency of Taiwan reported that Shadowrocket is known as a "fanqiang artifact" (a tool for bypassing a firewall). Hong-Kong-based NewMobileLife commented that as the most popular Shadowsocks client on the iOS platform, Shadowrocket is faster than its free counterpart Wingy.

Shadowrocket was the second-most-popular paid iPhone application in the United States App Store in 2023, second only to Procreate; it was also the top-paid iPhone application in the Hong Kong App Store in 2020, and in Taiwan in 2023 and 2024.
