= Vidhya Ramalingam =

American technology executive

Vidhya Ramalingam is an American counter-extremism specialist and technology executive. She is the co-founder and chief executive officer of Moonshot, a company that uses data analytics and digital campaigns to address online harms. Her work has focused particularly on white nationalist extremism and the use of online interventions to prevent violence.

== Early life and education ==
Ramalingam is the daughter of Indian immigrants and grew up in North America. She studied Anthropology and Inequality Studies at Cornell University and later completed an MPhil in Migration Studies at the University of Oxford.

== Career ==
Ramalingam's early work concerned migration, integration and far-right political movements. She worked at the Institute for Strategic Dialogue, where she led its programme on far-right extremism and intolerance, and later worked as a senior research fellow at the Institute for Public Policy Research.

As an anthropologist, Ramalingam conducted ethnographic research with white nationalist movements in Sweden. Her research included a study of the Sweden Democrats and the effect of social stigma on the party's political development. Following the 2011 Norway attacks, she led a European intergovernmental initiative on far-right terrorism and extremism, working with practitioners and government officials across ten countries between 2012 and 2014.

In 2015, Ramalingam co-founded Moonshot with Ross Frenett. The company was founded in London and initially focused on countering violent extremism and terrorism. It subsequently applied its methods to other online harms, including vaccine disinformation, human trafficking and gang violence.

== Public policy ==
Ramalingam has testified before United States congressional committees and other legislative bodies on the threat posed by white nationalist and ideologically motivated extremism. She has written and spoken publicly on countering far-right extremism, including on the challenges of researching such movements as a woman of colour.
