= Outline VPN =

Free and open-source Shadowsocks deployment tool

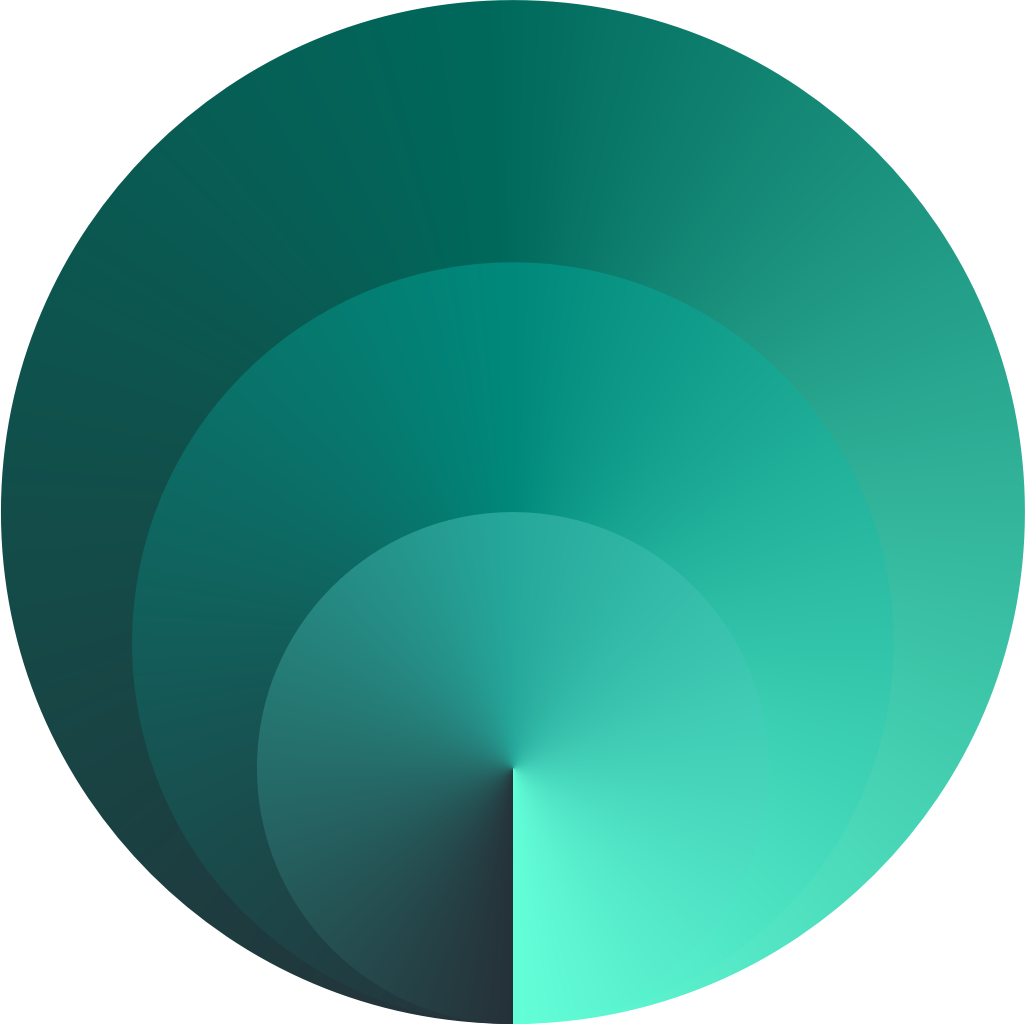
- Developer: Jigsaw
- Written in: TypeScript, Go, Java, Swift, Objective C, C++, C#
- Operating system: Windows; macOS; Linux; ChromeOS; Android; iOS
- Available in: English
- License: Apache License 2.0
- Website: Official website

Outline VPN is a free and open-source tool that deploys Shadowsocks servers on multiple cloud service providers. The software suite also includes client software for multiple platforms. Outline was developed by Jigsaw, a technology incubator created by Google.^{[3]}

The Outline Server supports self-hosting, as well as cloud service providers including DigitalOcean, Rackspace, Google Cloud Platform, and Amazon EC2. Installation involves running a command on its command-line interface, or in the case of installing on DigitalOcean or Google Cloud, its graphical user interface.

== Components ==
Outline has three main components:

- The Outline Server acts as a proxy and relays connections between the client and the sites they want to access. It is based on Shadowsocks, and offers a REST API for management of the server by the Outline Manager application.
- The Outline Manager is a graphical application used to deploy and manage access to Outline Servers. It supports Windows, macOS and Linux.
- The Outline Client connects to the internet via the Outline Server. It supports Windows, macOS, Linux, ChromeOS, Android, and iOS.

== Security and privacy ==
Outline uses the Shadowsocks protocol for communication between the client and server. Traffic is encrypted with the IETF ChaCha20 stream cipher (256-bit key) and authenticated with the IETF Poly1305 authenticator.

Outline is free and open-source, licensed under the Apache License 2.0, and was audited by Radically Open Security and claims not to log users' web traffic. The Outline Server supports unattended upgrades.

Outline is not a true virtual private network (VPN) solution but rather a Shadowsocks-based proxy. The two technologies are similar in the way they can be used to redirect network traffic and make it appear as originating from another device (the server), and hide the traffic's final destination from observers and filters until it reaches the proxy server. However, a VPN has additional capabilities, such as encapsulating traffic within a virtual tunnel, and allowing connected devices to "see" each other (as if they were connected to a LAN).

Outline is not an anonymity tool, and it does not provide the same degree of anonymity protections as Tor Browser, which routes traffic through three hops rather than just one and also protects against attacks like browser fingerprinting.

== Critical reception ==
In March 2018, Max Eddy of PCMag stated that a preview version of Outline VPN was "startlingly easy to use" and "removes privacy concerns associated with VPN companies". However, Eddy criticized the software for not encrypting all traffic on Windows, and warned users that "individual use may lack some anonymity compared [to] large VPN companies".

Since version 1.2, the Outline Windows client came out of 'Beta', effectively beginning to encrypt all traffic from the device, on par with the Outline clients for macOS, ChromeOS, Android, and iOS.

== See also ==
- Comparison of virtual private network services
- Internet privacy
- Amnezia VPN
