= French submarine Morse =

Four submarines of the French Navy have borne the name Morse ("Walrus"):

- French submarine Morse (Q3), a pioneering French Navy submarine of 1899
- French submarine Morse (Q117), a Requin-class submarine of 1925
- French submarine Morse (T3), ex-Royal Navy submarine HMS Vortex, transferred in 1944
- French submarine Morse (Q638), a Narval-class submarine of 1960
