= Drogou =

Drogou may refer to:

- François Drogou (1904–1940), French naval officer
- French aviso Drogou, a French warship in commission from 1976 to 2000
