= French submarine Monge (Q144) =

Monge
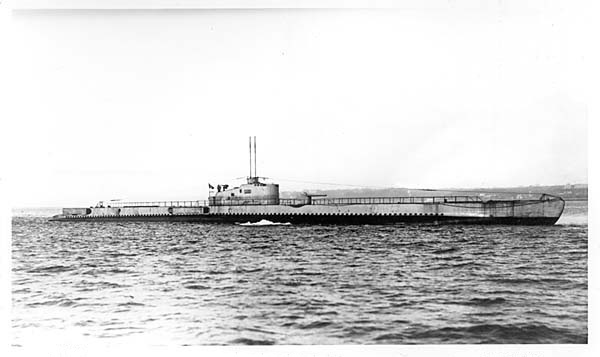
- Monge's sister ship Ajax in 1930.

History

France
- Name: Monge
- Namesake: Gaspard Monge (1746–1818), French mathematician
- Operator: French Navy
- Builder: Société Nouvelle des Forges et Chantiers de la Méditerranée, La Seyne-sur-Mer, France
- Laid down: 15 September 1927
- Launched: 25 June 1929
- Commissioned: 19 June 1932
- Home port: Toulon, France
- Fate: Sunk 8 May 1942

General characteristics
- Class & type: Redoutable-class submarine
- Displacement: 1,572 tonnes (1,547 long tons) (surfaced); 2,092 tonnes (2,059 long tons) (submerged)
- Length: 92.3 m (302 ft 10 in)
- Beam: 8.1 m (26 ft 7 in)
- Draft: 4.4 m (14 ft 5 in) (surfaced)
- Propulsion: 2 × diesel engines, 6,000 hp (4,474 kW); 2 × electric motors, 2,250 hp (1,678 kW)
- Speed: 17.5 kn (32.4 km/h; 20.1 mph) (surfaced); 10 kn (19 km/h; 12 mph) (submerged)
- Range: 14,000 nmi (26,000 km; 16,000 mi) at 7 kn (13 km/h; 8.1 mph) (surfaced); 10,000 nmi (19,000 km; 12,000 mi) at 10 kn (19 km/h; 12 mph) (surfaced); 4,000 nmi (7,400 km; 4,600 mi) at 17 kn (31 km/h; 20 mph) (surfaced); 90 nmi (170 km; 100 mi) at 7 kn (13 km/h; 8.1 mph) (submerged)
- Test depth: 80 m (262 ft)
- Complement: 5 officers (6 in operations); 66 men
- Armament: 11 torpedo tubes; 1 × 100 mm (3.9 in) gun; 1 × 13.2 mm (0.5 in) machine gun

Monge was a French Navy Redoutable-class submarine of the M6 series commissioned in 1932. She participated in World War II, first on the side of the Allies from 1939 to June 1940, then in the navy of Vichy France until she was sunk in 1942.

== Characteristics ==
Profile of Casabianca, sister ship of Monge.

Monge was part of a fairly homogeneous series of 31 deep-sea patrol submarines also called "1,500-tonners" because of their displacement. All entered service between 1931 and 1939.

The Redoutable-class submarines were 92.3 metres (302 ft 10 in) long and 8.1 metres (26 ft 7 in) in beam and had a draft of 4.4 metres (14 ft 5 in). They could dive to a depth of 80 metres (262 ft). They displaced 1,572 tonnes (1,547 long tons) on the surface and 2,082 tonnes (2,049 long tons) underwater. Propelled on the surface by two diesel engines producing a combined 6,000 horsepower (4,474 kW), they had a maximum speed of 18.6 knots (34.4 km/h; 21.4 mph). When submerged, their two electric motors produced a combined 2,250 horsepower (1,678 kW) and allowed them to reach 10 knots (19 km/h; 12 mph). Also called "deep-cruising submarines", their range on the surface was 10,000 nautical miles (19,000 km; 12,000 mi) at 10 knots (19 km/h; 12 mph). Underwater, they could travel 100 nautical miles (190 km; 120 mi) at 5 knots (9.3 km/h; 5.8 mph).

== Construction and commissioning ==
Monge was authorized under the 1925 naval program. She was laid down at Société Nouvelle des Forges et Chantiers de la Méditerranée at La Seyne-sur-Mer, France, on 17 May 1927 with the hull number Q144. Work on her was halted on 15 September 1927, but it later resumed and she was launched on 25 June 1929. She completed fitting out for her sea trials on 1 December 1929, successfully finished her trials on 26 February 1930, and completed fitting out on 10 August 1931. Declared complete on 30 January 1932, she was commissioned on 19 June 1932.

== Service history ==
=== 1932–1939 ===
Among officers serving aboard Monge during the mid-1930s was François Drogou (1904–1940), later a recipient of the Order of Liberation.

Monge and her sister ship Pégase departed Toulon, France, on 16 December 1936 for a deployment to French Indochina in Southeast Asia, where they remained from January to March 1937. They then returned to Toulon, which they reached on 15 May 1937.

=== World War II ===
==== French Navy ====
At the start of World War II in September 1939, Monge was assigned to the 5th Submarine Division in the 3rd Submarine Squadron, 1st Flotilla, 2nd Squadron, based at Toulon. Her sister ships L'Espoir and Pégase made up the rest of the division

German ground forces advanced into France on 10 May 1940, beginning the Battle of France, and Italy declared war on France on 10 June 1940 and joined the invasion. Monge and Pégase departed Toulon on 11 June and patrolled in the Mediterranean Sea south and southeast of Malta until 20 June 1940 to search for and attack Italian convoys making the passage between Italy and Tripolitania. The Battle of France ended in France's defeat and armistices with Germany on 22 June 1940 and with Italy on 24 June, both of which went into effect on 25 June 1940.

==== Vichy France ====
After France's surrender, Monge served in the naval forces of Vichy France. In September 1940, the Vichy French Admiralty, with the concurrence of the Armistice Commission, decided to reinforce French naval forces in Southeast Asia by deploying four submarines to French Indochina. Two submarine divisions were formed for the deployment, the 8th at Toulon, consisting of the Redoutable-class submarines L'Espoir and Vengeur, and the 22nd at Bizerte in Tunisia, consisting of Monge and Pégase . On 11 October 1940, Monge and Pégase departed Bizerte under escort by the Élan-class sloop La Batailleuse bound for Oran in Algeria. There they rendezvoused with L'Espoir, Vengeur, and the tanker Lot, which was to accompany the submarines on their journey, the tanker and the four submarines being designated the "Lot Group" for purposes of the voyage. Monge′s commanding officer, who also served as commander of the 22nd Submarine Division, took on the additional responsibility of commanding the Lot Group as a whole. After a stay at Oran that lasted from 13 to 16 October, Lot and the four submarines passed through the Strait of Gibraltar under the escort of the destroyers Casque and Épée under conditions of high tension with the United Kingdom and arrived at Casablanca in French Morocco on 18 October 1940 for a brief stopover. They then proceeded to Dakar in Senegal.

On 23 October 1940, the submarines got underway from Dakar to patrol off the Canary Islands. They encountered very heavy weather, and Pégase suffered damage to one of her diving planes. The submarines returned to Dakar on 28 October 1940. Subsequently, the submarines took turns conducting defensive patrols 10 to 35 nautical miles (19 to 65 km; 12 to 40 mi) off Dakar.

On 17 December 1940, Lot and the four submarines got underway from Dakar to continue the voyage to French Indochina, with their next stop at Madagascar. Bad weather helped to conceal them from detection by the British, and they rounded the Cape of Good Hope without incident. They encountered a tropical cyclone as they approached Madagascar, and anchored at Tamatave, Madagascar, on 15 January 1941. A second cyclone struck Tamatave on the day of their arrival, and Monge and Pégase in particular faced its more severe effects. The two submarines got underway for Diego-Suarez in northern Madagascar on 16 January 1941, and entered drydock for repairs after their arrival. L'Espoir, Vengeur and Lot departed Tamatave on 22 January 1941 to join them at Diego-Suarez. A lack of docking space at Diego-Suarez delayed their arrival, but the three vessels finally moored at Diego-Suarez on 2 February 1941.

The Lot Group′s departure for French Indochina was delayed when the commanding officer of Monge, who also served as commander of the 22nd Submarine Division and of the Lot Group as a whole, became extremely intoxicated and began to show the early signs of a nervous breakdown. The plans for L'Espoir and Vengeur to deploy to French Indochina were cancelled. On 16 February 1941, however, Monge, Pégase, and Lot finally departed Diego-Suarez to begin the last leg of their voyage to French Indochina, which they completed without further incident with their arrival at Saigon on 6 March 1941, too late to participate in the Franco-Thai War, which had concluded on 28 January 1941. Upon arrival at Saigon, the two submarines began repairs to their air compressors and blower fans. On 8 March 1941, the Lot Group was dissolved.

After the completion of repairs, Monge and Pégase departed Saigon on 15 March 1941 for a two-month cruise to make "representation" visits to ports along the coast of French Indochina. They stopped first at Cam Ranh, pausing to hold a memorial service in the South China Sea over the wreck of their sister ship Phénix, lost with all hands in a diving accident on 15 June 1939. They then visited Qui Nhon and Haiphong in French Indochina and Fort Bayard in Kouang-Tcheou-Wan, China, before beginning their return journey, stopping in French Indochina at Hạ Long Bay, Cape Varella, Tourane, and Cam Ranh before returning to Saigon in mid-May 1941.

On 19 May 1941, Monge and Pégase were placed under the command of the admiral commanding French naval forces in French Indochina. During the rest of May and in June 1941, they conducted training trips off French Indochina. Monge then underwent a major refit at Saigon.

After the completion of her refit, Monge was reassigned to Diego-Suarez. She departed French Indochina on 6 or 7 September 1941 (according to different sources) to return to Madagascar, escorting a convoy. She arrived at Diego-Suarez on 7 October 1941.

After unloading two of her torpedoes to make room for cargo, she brought aboard 21 tonnes (21 long tons; 23 short tons) of food for transportation to Djibouti in French Somaliland, which was under blockade by the British. Departing Diego-Suarez on 17 October, she arrived at Djibouti without incident at 10:00 on 25 October 1941. In early November 1941, she made several sorties into the Gulf of Tadjoura to ward off the British. She took up a position off Cape Gardafui on the coast of British-occupied Italian Somaliland on 14 November 1941 to rendezvous with the cargo ship Surcouf, which was carrying a cargo of 1,500 tonnes (1,480 long tons; 1,650 short tons) of food for Djibouti, but Surcouf had taken refuge at Nosy Be off the northwest coast of Madagascar. Monge waited in vain for Surcouf until 27 November 1941, then proceeded to Diego-Suarez, arriving there on 1 December 1941.

On 30 January 1942, Monge got underway for Tamatave to rendezvous there with the French cargo ship Amiral Pierre, which she had orders to escort to Réunion. The two vessels departed Tamatave on 1 February and arrived at Pointe des Galets on Réunion on 4 February 1942. After Amiral Pierre unloaded her cargo, they began their return voyage to Tamatave on 14 February 1942. Monge′s crew enjoyed a rest period at Tamatave until 20 February 1942, when Monge got underway to return to Diego-Suarez, which she reached on 22 February 1942 after an absence of 22 days during which she had traveled 1,600 nautical miles (2,963 km; 1,841 mi).

On 1 May 1942, Monge began another voyage to Réunion, escorting the cargo ship Condé. While she was at Saint-Denis on Réunion, the Battle of Madagascar began with British amphibious landings near Diego-Suarez early on 5 May 1942. At 03:15 on 5 May, Monge received orders to take up position in a patrol area just north of Diego-Suarez and east of Cap d'Ambre — the northern tip of Madagascar — and to attack any British ships she encountered during her voyage from Réunion. Monge got underway from Saint-Denis immediately, proceeded to her assigned patrol area, and began a submerged patrol.

==== Loss ====
At 07:55 on 8 May 1942, Monge fired a torpedo at the Royal Navy aircraft carrier HMS Indomitable. The destroyers HMS Active and HMS Panther sighted Monge and counterattacked immediately. Active dropped ten depth charges at 08:06 and ten more at 08:18. Panther then also attacked with depth charges. The attacks sank Monge in the Indian Ocean off Diego-Suarez with the loss of her entire crew of 69.
