= The Outline =

The Outline may refer to:

- The Outline (band), an American rock band
- The Outline (website), an online news magazine

== See also ==
- Outline (disambiguation)
