= Project Shield =

Anti-distributed-denial-of-service (anti-DDoS) service

- Founded: 2013; 13 years ago
- Website: projectshield.withgoogle.com

Project Shield is a free service providing protection against distributed denial-of-service (DDoS) attacks. This service is offered by Jigsaw, a subsidiary of Google, to websites that have "media, elections, and human rights related content." The main goal of the project is to serve "small, under-resourced news sites that are vulnerable to the web's growing epidemic of DDOS attacks", according to team lead George Conard.

Google initially announced Project Shield at their Ideas Conference on October 21, 2013. The service was initially only offered to trusted testers, but on February 25, 2016, Google opened up the service to any qualifying website a Google-owned reverse proxy that identifies and filters malicious traffic. In May 2018, Jigsaw announced that it would start offering free protection from distributed denial of service attacks to US political campaigns, candidates, and political action committees.

In January 2019, Google's Jigsaw expanded Project Shield to offer free DDoS protection to political organizations and websites in Europe, ahead of the 2019 European Parliament elections.
