= French submarine Narval (1925) =

French Requin-class submarine

Narval
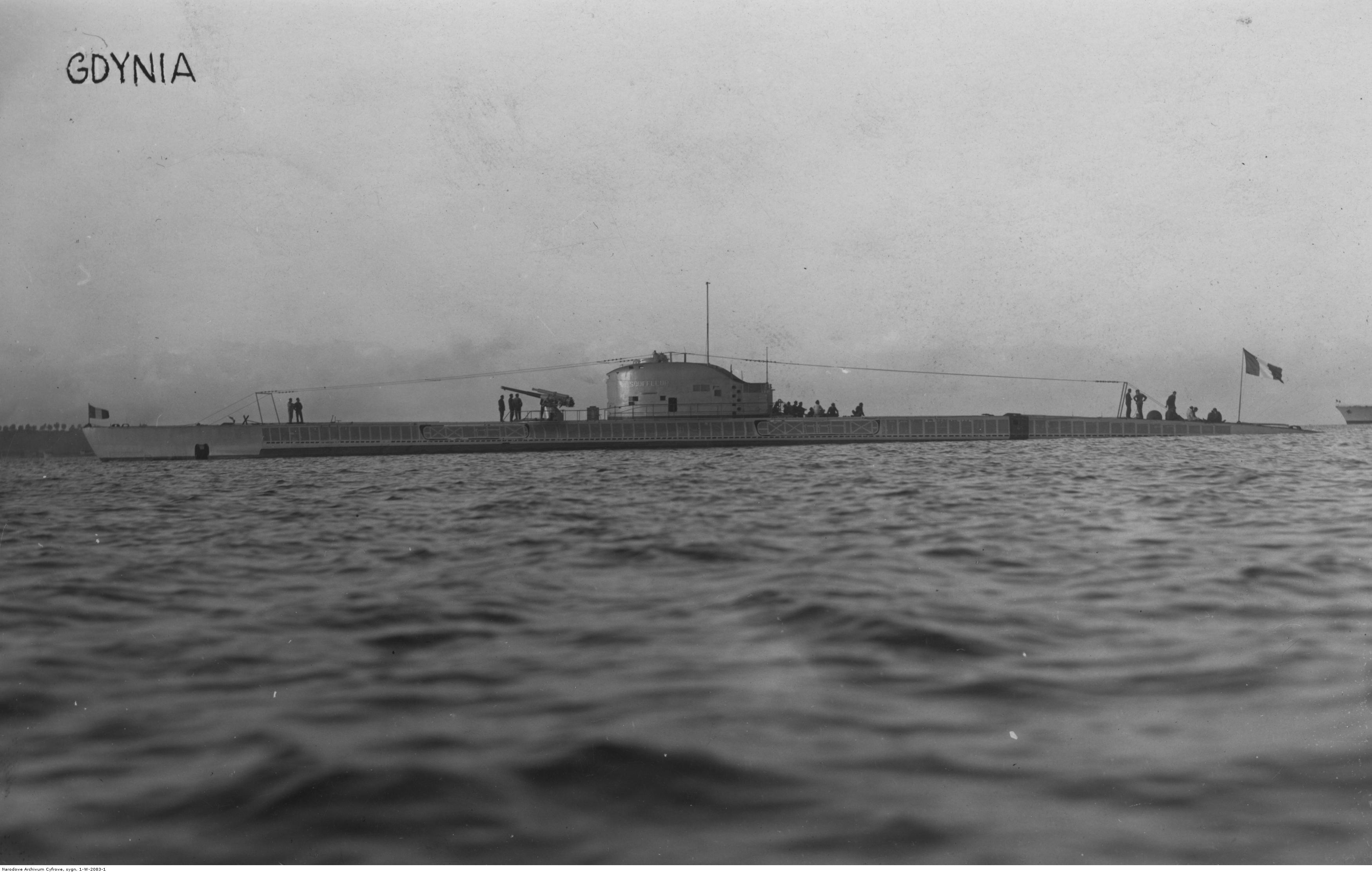
- Sister ship Souffleur in 1926

History

France
- Name: Narval
- Operator: French Navy
- Builder: Arsenal de Cherbourg
- Laid down: 19 March 1923
- Launched: 9 May 1925
- Commissioned: 23 July 1926
- Fate: Sunk by a mine off Tunisia on or around 15 December 1940.

General characteristics
- Type: Submarine
- Displacement: 1,150 long tons (1,168 t) (surfaced); 1,441 long tons (1,464 t) (submerged)
- Length: 78.30 m (256 ft 11 in)
- Beam: 6.84 m (22 ft 5 in)
- Draught: 5.10 m (16 ft 9 in)
- Propulsion: 2 × diesel engines, 2,900 hp (2,163 kW); 2 × electric motors, 1,800 hp (1,342 kW)
- Speed: 15 knots (28 km/h) (surfaced); 9 knots (17 km/h) (submerged)
- Range: 7,700 nautical miles (14,300 km) at 9 knots (17 km/h); 70 nautical miles (130 km) at 5 knots (9.3 km/h) (submerged)
- Test depth: 80 m (260 ft)
- Complement: 51 men
- Armament: 10 × 550 mm (21.7 in) torpedo tubes; 1 × 100 mm (3.9 in) deck gun; 2 × 8 mm (0.31 in) machine guns

The French submarine Narval was a Requin-class submarine built for the French Navy in the mid-1920s. Laid down in March 1923, it was launched in May 1925 and commissioned in July 1926. It joined the Free French naval forces at Malta at the time of the French surrender during World War II. On or around 15 December 1940, Narval sank after striking a mine in the same minefield off the Kerkennah Islands that sank her sister ship Morse six months prior.

== Design ==
Measuring 78 m (255 ft 11 in) long, with a beam of 6.8 m (22 ft 4 in) and a draught of 5.1 m (16 ft 9 in), Requin-class submarines could dive up to 80 m (260 ft). The submarine had a surfaced displacement of 1,150 long tons (1,168 t) and a submerged displacement of 1,441 long tons (1,464 t). Propulsion while surfaced was provided by two 2,900 hp (2,163 kW) diesel motors and two 1,800 hp (1,342 kW) electric motors. The submarines' electrical propulsion allowed it to attain speeds of 9 knots (17 km/h; 10 mph) while submerged and 15 knots (28 km/h; 17 mph) on the surface. Their surfaced range was 7,700 nautical miles (14,300 km) at 9 knots (17 km/h), and 4,000 nautical miles (7,400 km) at 12 knots (22 km/h), with a submerged range of 70 nautical miles (130 km) at 5 knots (9.3 km/h).

== Career ==
From 1935 to 1937, Narval underwent a thorough overhaul. At the outbreak of World War II, Narval served in the Mediterranean Sea, joining the 4th Submarine Flotilla in Bizerte, then being transferred to Beirut. Narval's commander was Captain Cloarec. On 11 June 1940, Narval returned to Bizerte. At the time of signing the French surrender, the ship was on patrol, and its commander ignored the order on 17 June to stop visiting the British ports, and sailed to Malta. She entered the Free French Naval Forces. On 15 December 1940, Narval blew up on a mine in the same minefield off the Kerkennah Islands that sank her sister ship Morse six months earlier.
