= François Drogou =

- Born: 30 December 1904; Bohars, France
- Died: 15 December 1940 (aged 35); Gulf of Gabès, off Tunisia
- Military career
- Allegiance: France
- Branch: French Navy
- Service years: 1925–1940
- Rank: Capitaine de frégate (Frigate Captain)
- Commands: Orion; Narval
- Conflicts: World War II; Battle of the Mediterranean
- Awards: Knight of the Legion of Honor; Croix de guerre 1939-1945

François Drogou (30 December 1904 - 15 December 1940) was a French Navy officer who became a Companion of Liberation posthumously by decree of 31 January 1941. An experienced naval officer, he specialized in submarine warfare shortly before World War II. After the armistice of 22 June 1940, he decided to join Free France and subsequently operated in the Mediterranean Sea, where he disappeared with the entire crew of his submarine.

== Biography ==
=== Early life and pre-World War II career ===
François Drogou was born on 30 December 1904, in Bohars in Finistère, France. In 1923, he entered the École navale (the French naval academy), from which he graduated in 1925 and was commissioned in the French Navy with the rank of enseigne de vaisseau de 2e classe (ensign 2nd class). He first embarked on the armored cruiser Jeanne d'Arc until 1926 and then was assigned to the battleship Paris. Promoted to enseigne de vaisseau de 1re classe (ensign 1st class) in 1927, he was assigned to the destroyer Enseigne Gabolde until 1928, then to the battleship Condorcet. He served aboard the light cruiser Primauguet from April 1929 to May 1931.

Drogou was promoted to lieutenant in 1932 and then specialized in submarine warfare. He served successively aboard the submarines Argo, Oréade, and Monge. In August 1937, he took command of the submarine Orion, remaining her commanding officer until July 1939.

=== Second World War ===
==== French Navy ====
France entered World War II on the side of the Allies on 3 September 1939. Assigned during the first months of the war to the 3rd Submarine Squadron, Drogou took command in February 1940 of the submarine Narval, which operated in the Mediterranean Sea. Narval was assigned to the monitoring of Italian shipping traffic to Libya.

German ground forces advanced into France during the Battle of France on 10 May 1940, and Italy declared war on France on 10 June 1940 and joined the invasion. With France facing defeat, the Free French leader Charles de Gaulle issued his appeal of 18 June 1940 for France to continue the fight. That day, Drogou wrote to his wife, "I'm leaving, that's all I know, what I also know is that neither you nor our children will have to be ashamed of their father. From this hour, I move away from any other consideration. I fight, and until the end. I will do what I consider to be my duty. I make war."

France concluded the armistice of 22 June 1940 with Germany and Italy while Narval was in port at Sousse, Tunisia. With the armistice scheduled to go into effect on 25 June 1940, Drogou and part of his crew, inspired by de Gaulle′s appeal, decided to disobey orders and refuse to honor the armistice. Leaving 31 sailors who did not choose to join them ashore at Sousse, and having mentioned nothing about his plans to the commander of his submarine division, Drogou got Narval underway from Sousse with his remaining crew on the evening of 24 June 1940 bound for Malta. He earned lasting fame with a message he transmitted en route, which stated, "Betrayal [also translated as "Treason"] all along the line, we are headed for an English port," expanded by one source to read "Betrayal all along the line, we are headed for an English port to continue the fight against the Germans!" After arriving at Malta on 26 June 1940, he and his crew joined the Free French Naval Forces on 27 June 1940. Narval was the first French ship to respond to de Gaulle′s appeal, and the only French submarine in the Mediterranean to do so.

==== Free French Naval Forces ====
Promoted to capitaine de corvette (corvette captain) in August 1940, Drogou retained command of Narval and despite severe manning and training difficulties carried out three patrols off Libya. His first patrol was in company with the British Royal Navy submarine HMS Rorqual from 25 September to 8 October 1940, followed by a second patrol from 25 October to 3 November 1940 between Lampedusa and the Kerkennah Islands.

==== Death ====
Dispatched to patrol off Derna, Libya, for her third patrol, from which she was scheduled to return on 16 December 1940, Narval was last heard from on 2 December 1940, subsequently disappearing with the loss of Drogou and his entire crew. Italian divers discovered Narval′s wreck — her bow split open, apparently by a mine — off the Kerkennah Islands in the Gulf of Gabès off the coast of Tunisia in October 1957, leading to the conclusion that she apparently struck a French mine in a defensive minefield, probably on 15 December 1940.

In his 2003 book The Fighting Tenth: The 10th Submarine Flotilla and the Siege of Malta, John Wingate relates a different account of the loss of Narval in which she departed for her third patrol on 29 December 1940 and was due to return from it on 11 January 1941, but was rammed and sunk with the loss of all hands by the Italian torpedo boat Clio — which recovered lifebelts with Narval′s name on them, but no survivors — and was declared missing by British authorities at Malta on 14 January 1941. In his 2011 book The SURCOUF Conspiracy: A Penetrating Analysis of the Worst Submarine Disaster in History, John Grigore Jr. specifies that Clio sank Narval off Derna on 7 January 1941.

=== Posthumous events ===
De Gaulle promoted Drogou posthumously to capitaine de frégate (frigate captain) on 1 January 1941. By decree of 31 January 1941, he received the Order of Liberation and became a Companion of Liberation.

In September 1941, the Vichy French Admiralty fabricated a rumor that Drogou, deciding that he had misunderstood his duty to France and that the Free French had misled him, had left Malta in an attempt to reach metropolitan France, and that the Royal Navy had assassinated Drogou by sending two warships after Narval, which had sunk her with all hands.

== Honors and awards ==
- Knight of the Legion of Honor
- Order of Liberation (Companion of Liberation)
- Croix de guerre 1939-1945
- Resistance Medal
- Knight of the Imperial Order of the Dragon of Annam 5th class

== Commemoration ==
- The French Navy named the aviso Drogou in Drogou′s honor.
- Drogou′s name appears on the stele erected in memory of the crew of Narval on the esplanade of Château de Brest in Brest.
- François Drogou is inscribed on the commemorative monument to submariners erected in the park of the Tour Royale in Toulon, France.
- A commemorative plaque dedicated to Drogou is on a wall at the former Lorient Submarine Base in Lorient, France.
- Two streets bear Drogou′s name, in Bohars and Brest.
