= Jean Venturini =

French poet

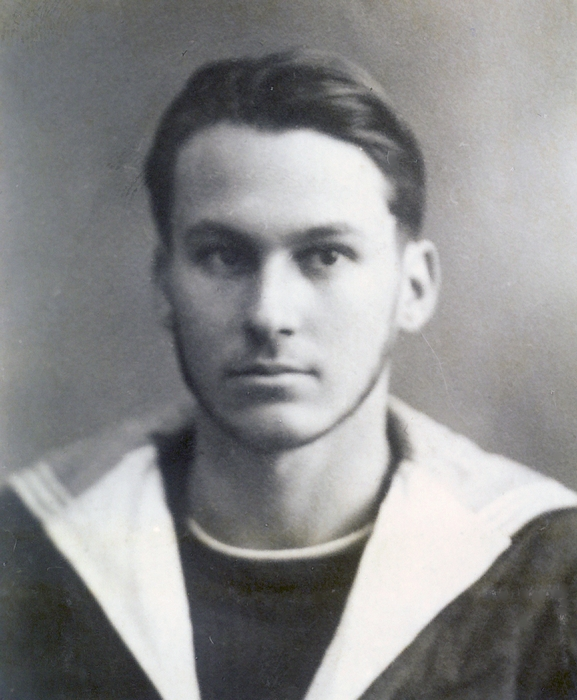
- Jean Venturini in 1939, a few months before his death
- Born: Jean-Bernard Venturini; 17 September 1919; Nabeul, French Tunisia
- Died: 17 June 1940 (aged 20); French submarine Morse, off Sfax, French Tunisia
- Occupation: Poet
- Writing career
- Literary movement: Surrealism

Jean Venturini (17 September 1919 – 17 June 1940) was a French poet and sailor. He died at the age of 20 during the Second World War when his submarine was lost in the Mediterranean Sea.

== Biography ==
Jean Venturini was born in Nabeul, Tunisia, and spent most of his childhood in Morocco. In his teens, he studied at a high school near Meknes. He began writing poetry at the age of 16, poems which were later collected and published in November 1939 as Outlines. This was to be his only published work. He was killed in June 1940, along with the entire crew of the submarine Morse, which had struck a mine. He had trained as a signaller before joining the French Navy in 1939.

Outlines is a collection of poems heavily influenced by the theories of poet Arthur Rimbaud. With its themes and writing, this work is very close to the surrealist aesthetic.

== Works ==
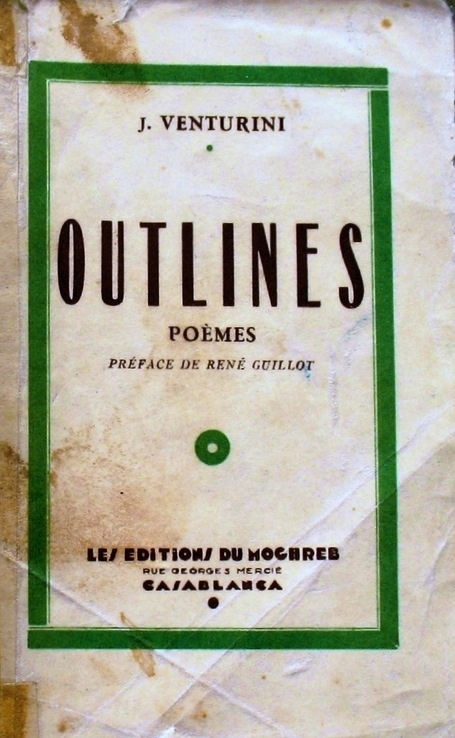
Outlines (1939 version)

- (in French) Outlines, collection of poems, Casablanca, Éditions du Moghreb, November 1939, 80 p.
- (in French) Outlines : reissue with a biographical afterword on the sinking of the submarine « Morse », Paris, Vaillant, June 2009, 112 p. (ISBN 978-2-916986-06-7)
- Scattered poems, not collected :
  - (in French) Ballade d'un qui part, published in December 1939 by the review Fontaine
  - (in French) Une Pierre dans l'eau, published in May 1940 by the review Poésie 40
  - (in French) Victime d'affiches, unpublished manuscript poem, June 1940 (sent in a letter to a close friend)

== Bibliography ==
- (in French) Pierre Seghers, Le Livre d'or de la Poésie française, first volume : « Des origines à 1940 », Paris, Marabout, 1998, 488 p. (ISBN 978-2-501026-35-2)
- (in French) Collective work, Dictionnaire des lettres françaises, sixth volume : « Le xxe siècle », Paris, LGF-Le Livre de Poche, 1998, 1174 p. (ISBN 2-253-13109-1)
- (in French) « La mémoire engloutie », a study by Jean-Luc Falco, foreword to the reissue of Outlines
- (in French) Collective work, Anthologie des écrivains morts à la guerre, 1939-1945, Paris, Albin Michel, 1998, 808 p. (ISBN 9782226045126)

== See also ==
- List of French-language poets
