= Amnezia VPN =

Open-source self-hosted VPN software

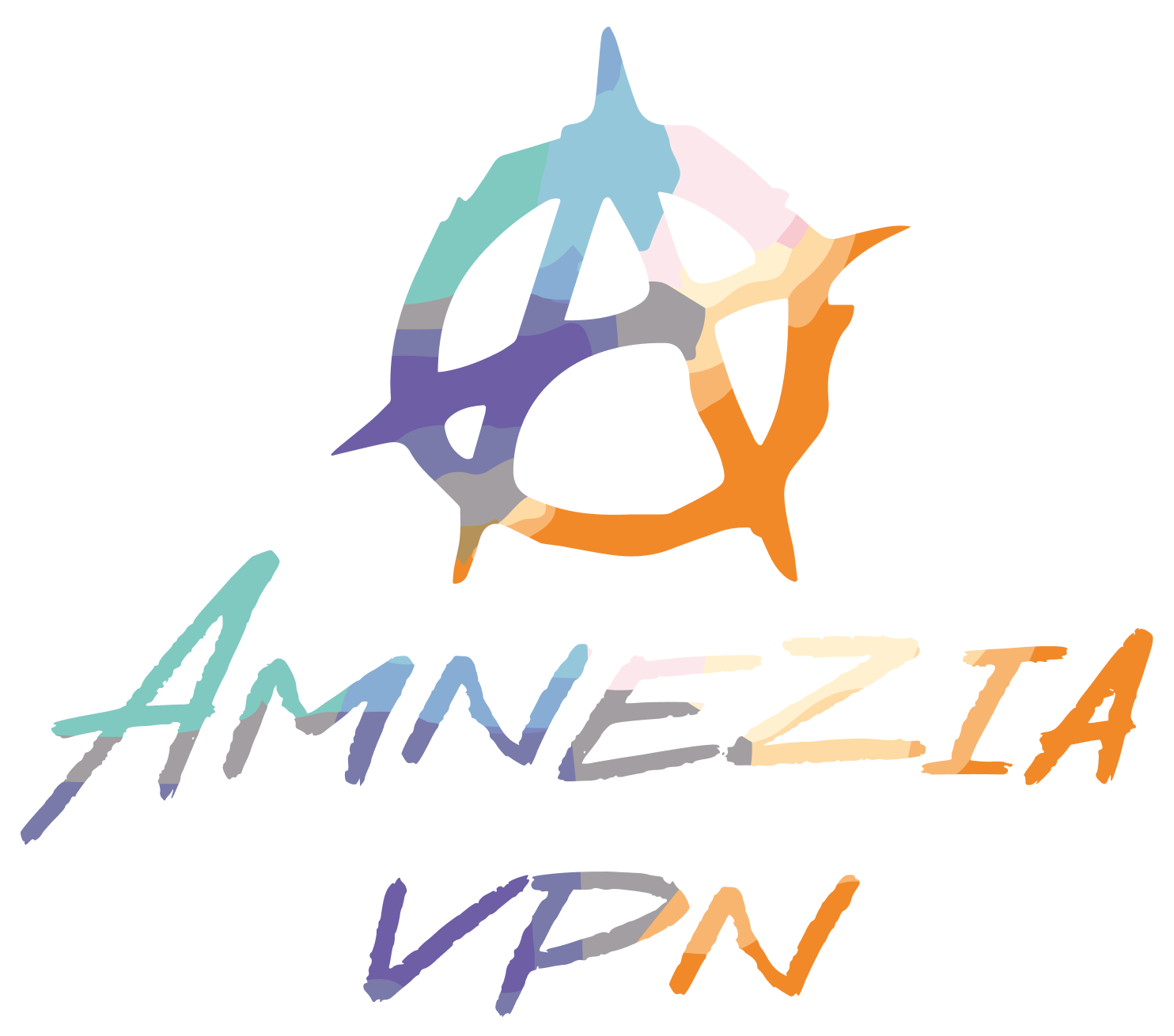
- Written in: C++
- Operating system: Windows; macOS; Linux; Android; iOS
- Available in: English, Russian, Ukrainian, Chinese, Arabic, Burmese
- License: GNU GPL 3.0
- Website: amnezia.org
- Repository: https://github.com/amnezia-vpn/

Amnezia VPN is a service built on free and open-source software and developed by Amnezia, a company that creates tools for self-hosted VPN infrastructure and censorship circumvention.

It allows users to create a personal VPN on their own server, also offers managed VPN services, and supports the OpenVPN, WireGuard, Shadowsocks, IKEv2, Cloak, Xray and AmneziaWG protocols.

== History ==
Amnezia VPN is a project by Internet activists from Russia, who are searching for solutions to resist state censorship. The first version was designed during the Demhack hackathon in 2020, held by digital human rights activists from Roskomsvoboda.

== Features ==
Amnezia VPN supports modern blocking bypass protocols and works even where other VPNs don't work - in Russia, Iran, and Myanmar. For countries with low internet censorship, Amnezia supports WireGuard and OpenVPN. In 2022, 2024 and 2025, Amnezia VPN successfully passed the security audit conducted by 7ASecurity. Amnezia has published their source code.

Amnezia introduced its own AmneziaWG protocol, a latest addition, which is an improved version of a popular WireGuard protocol and was designed to be used in the world's harshest internet climates.

It does not collect or transmit user logs or data and includes ChaCha20 encryption, DNS leak protection, and a kill switch.

Amnezia VPN does not require users to register, allowing all features to be accessed anonymously. It does not keep any logs of user activity and does not track users or use their personal data for any purposes.

== Technology ==
- OpenVPN (AES-256-GCM; AES-192-GCM; AES-128-GCM; AES-256-CBC; AES-192-CBC; AES-128-CBC; ChaCha20-Poly1305; ARIA-256-CBC; CAMELLIA-256-CBC). You cannot use encryption at all (this is separately disabled). There is support for TLS authorisation.
- OpenVPN over Cloak (for OpenVPN you can use the same encryption types written above); Cloak (ChaCha20-IETF-Pole1305; XChaCha20-IETF-Poly1305; AES-256-GCM; AES-192-GCM; AES-128-GCM) + setting up a Fake-Website for Cloak; Shadowsocks (ChaCha20-IETF-Pole1305; XChaChaCha20-IETF-Poly1305; AES-256-GCM; AES-192-GCM; AES-128-GCM)
- OpenVPN over Shadowsocks (for OpenVPN you can use the same encryption types written above); Shadowsocks (ChaCha20-IETF-Pole1305; XChaChaCha20-IETF-Poly1305; AES-256-GCM; AES-192-GCM; AES-128-GCM)
- AmneziaWG and WireGuard use the standard encryption method used in regular WireGuard.

== Products and services ==
=== Amnezia Free ===
Amnezia Free is a solution that provides free access to blocked media and social networks websites in countries with heavy internet censorship or where authorities put technical and financial pressure on VPN users and providers. The developers launched Amnezia Free in March 2022, when Russian authorities started blocking media and global social platforms based on military censorship. One year after its launch, Amnezia_Free had almost 100,000 active users.

By 2026, Amnezia Free reached 2.5 million monthly active users.

=== Amnezia Premium ===
Amnezia Premium is a paid VPN service that supports two obfuscation protocols: AmneziaWG and VLESS (Xray)

=== Amnezia Business ===
The corporate VPN service is designed for organizations and remote teams, providing access to internet resources and corporate infrastructure.

=== Amnezia Self-hosted ===
This free tool allows users to deploy VPN infrastructure on rented or self-owned servers.

== Availability ==
Amnezia Premium and Business are available from anywhere. Amnezia Free is available in Russia, Iran, Myanmar, Turkey, Vietnam, India, Pakistan, Nepal, Brazil, Venezuela, as well as Africa and some other regions, granting access to blocked websites and censored platforms that may be restricted in each specific region, such as Facebook, Instagram, X, etc.

== Reception ==
In April 2023, Wired magazine featured Amnezia VPN as an open-source VPN circumventing Russian censorship. It described that Amnezia VPN being a service that allows users to set up their own servers, making it harder for the Russian Government to block access to the outside world.

Mike Williams of TechRadar wrote that Amnezia's website has simple and clear setup instructions, starting with some suggestions on where to buy your own server.

In 2026, WhatsApp's Help Center listed Amnezia VPN among examples of well-regarded VPN providers for users whose networks block access to WhatsApp.

Technology publications described AmneziaWG 2.0 as an update to Amnezia's WireGuard-based obfuscation protocol designed to make VPN traffic harder to identify or block in restrictive network environments.
