= V2Ray =

Proxy server designed to bypass internet censorship

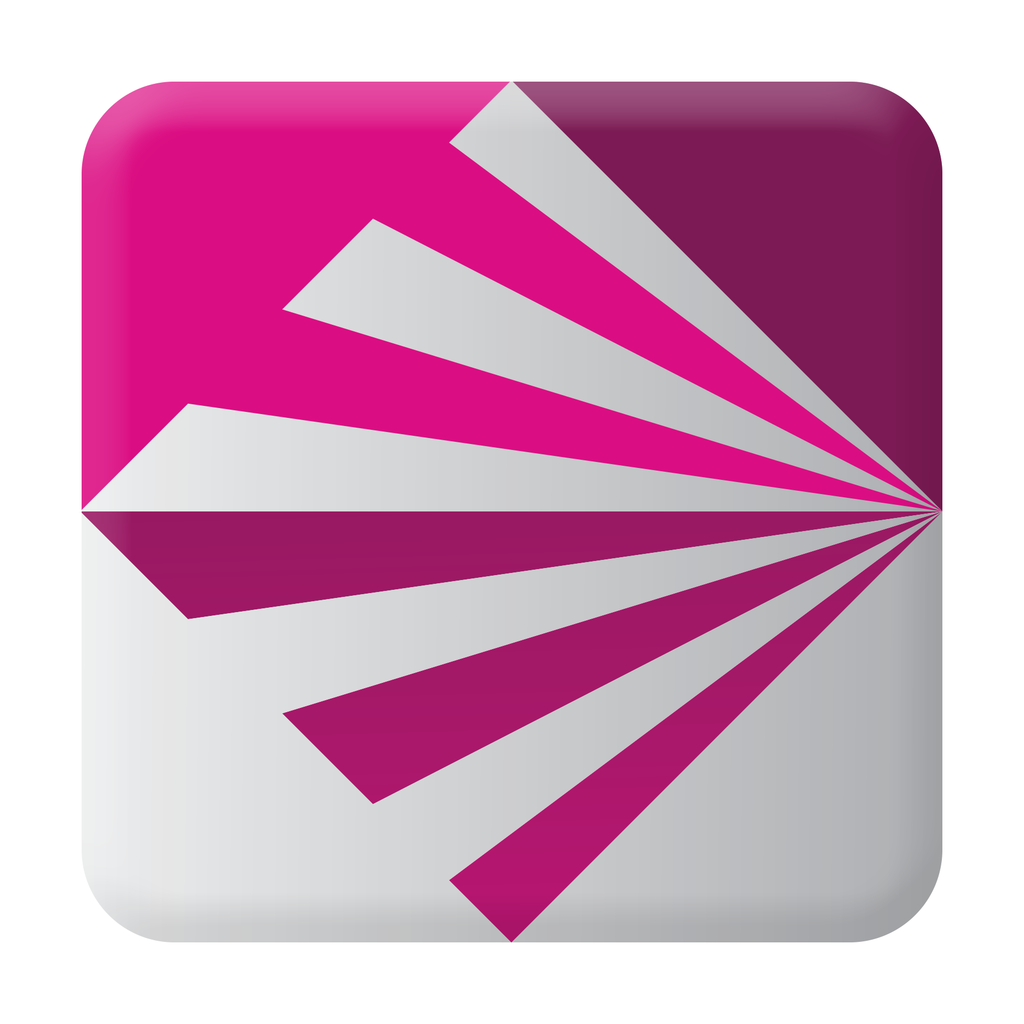
- Original author: Victoria Raymond
- Release: 0.1 (September 18, 2015)
- Written in: Go
- License: MIT License
- Website: v2ray.com
- Repository: github.com/v2fly

V2Ray is an open-source protocol part of the Project V platform, designed to enhance privacy and bypass censorship. It supports multiple tunneling protocols like VMess, Shadowsocks, SOCKS, and HTTP. Its modular design allows flexible configurations to adapt to various internet censorship scenarios.

VMess is V2Ray's primary protocol, uses strong encryption and dynamic port allocation to resist DPI-based detection. V2Ray can obfuscate traffic to mimic HTTPS or WebSocket and adjusts to changing network conditions, making it effective in censorship-heavy environments such as China.

== Operation principle ==
The operating principle of V2Ray is basically the same as other proxy tools: it uses specific relay servers to complete data transmission. For example, if a user cannot directly access websites like Google or YouTube but the proxy server can, and the user can connect directly to the proxy server, then the user can connect to the proxy server via specific software; the proxy server will fetch the website content and return it to the user, thereby achieving proxy browsing. Server and client software require users to provide certain parameters according to different protocols, such as UUID, keys, encryption methods, etc.; only when both sides match can the connection succeed (the VMess protocol can adapt to the encryption method used by the client). After connecting to the server, the client builds a local proxy on the host (such as VPN, Socks5/HTTP, transparent proxy, etc.). When browsing the web, the client collects network traffic through this proxy, then obfuscates and encrypts it and sends it to the server to prevent the traffic from being identified and intercepted. V2Ray positions itself as a platform; any developer can use the modules provided by V2Ray to develop new proxy software.

== Main features ==
Multiple inbounds and outbounds: A single V2Ray process can concurrently support multiple inbound and outbound protocols, each operating independently.

Customizable routing: Inbound traffic can be routed to different outbound exits according to configuration. Easily implement routing by region or by domain to achieve optimal network performance.

Multiple protocol support: V2Ray can enable multiple protocols simultaneously, including SOCKS, HTTP, Shadowsocks, VMess, Trojan and VLESS. Each protocol can independently set transport carriers, such as TCP, mKCP and WebSocket.

Obfuscation: Nodes using VMess, VLESS and Trojan protocols can masquerade as normal websites (HTTPS), mixing their traffic with normal web traffic to avoid third-party interference.

DNS cache: FakeIP support, reducing DNS queries. V2Ray also supports DNS over HTTPS.

Reverse proxy: General reverse proxy support, enabling intranet penetration functionality.

Multi-platform support: Native support for all common platforms such as Windows, macOS and Linux, with third-party support already available for mobile platforms.

== History ==
=== Patent incident ===
Professor Luo Senlin of Beijing Institute of Technology and two students, Wang Shuaipeng and Pan Limin, applied on 25 March 2019 for a patent titled "V2ray traffic identification method based on long short-term memory network". On 25 October 2019, the legal status of the patent was changed to "withdrawn after publication of the invention patent application".

The V2Ray project team stated that a patent does not guarantee the effectiveness of a method; a patent only protects the method itself. In addition, there are some issues in the patent description:

The patent mentions: "V2ray server and client need to pre-exchange keys for each communication, so the early packets of each communication have significant features." In fact, the VMess protocol does not have a "pre-exchange keys" step. Even if V2Ray is used together with a protocol that requires "pre-exchange keys", the packets used for the "pre-exchange keys" would not have V2Ray's data characteristics, because no valid data has been sent yet; any features would belong to the cooperating protocol. The patent spells V2Ray as "V2ray".

=== Disappearance of the original author ===
In February 2019, V2Ray project founder Victoria Raymond suddenly disappeared; her Twitter, Telegram and Zhihu stopped updating.

The original author's GitHub account remained active until the last commit in November 2019.

== Derived projects ==
=== Project X ===
Xray
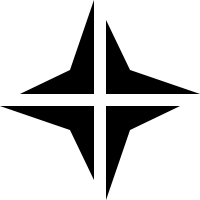
- Original author: RPRX
- Release: 1.0.0 (November 25, 2020; 5 years ago)
- Written in: Go
- Operating system: Unix-like operating system Microsoft Windows
- Type: proxy server Internet censorship circumvention free software application software
- License: Mozilla Public License 2.0
- Website: xtls.github.io
- Repository: github.com/XTLS/Xray-core

In November 2020, due to reasons including open source licensing, XTLS was removed from v2ray-core by the V2Ray community. The authors and supporters of VLESS and XTLS formed the Project X organization based on V2Ray and developed the V2Ray-derived version Xray. Because the Project X community is very active, most new graphical clients already support Xray.

=== V2Fly ===
V2Fly Reorganized and established by the open source community after the original author's disappearance.

=== Graphical clients derived from V2Ray ===
Because the V2Ray and Xray projects are open source, there are graphical proxy clients on sites like GitHub that are compatible with or include the V2Ray/Xray cores, such as v2rayNG, v2rayN, v2rayA and others.

=== Clash ===
Clash is a subscription-based proxy package and protocol delivered from V2Ray.

== Reception ==
An article in South China Morning Post stated that V2Ray is a reliable way for many people in China to access the global internet; these users are either technically proficient or subscribe to paid services. V2Ray is also described as the spiritual successor to Shadowsocks, and support for personal domains and TLS is seen as an improvement over Shadowsocks; these features can disguise traffic as visits to unblocked websites.

=== Cores ===
- V2Fly — community‑maintained core reorganized from the original V2Ray project.
- Xray — V2Ray‑derived core developed by Project X, adds VLESS/XTLS features.
- sing-box — modern proxy core/runtime supporting multiple protocols and V2Ray‑compatible transports.

=== Graphical clients ===
- v2rayNG — Android graphical client that uses V2Ray/Xray backends.
- v2rayN — Windows graphical client for configuring and running V2Ray.
- v2rayA — Linux web‑based GUI for V2Ray.
- Nekoray — cross‑platform GUI client (Windows, Linux, and macOS) compatible with V2Ray, Xray, and sing‑box backends.
- NekoBox — the mobile client designed specifically for Android
- GenyConnect — GenyConnect is a modern, cross-platform secure tunneling client designed for high performance, privacy, and precise traffic control.

=== Panels ===
- 3X-UI — a web‑based control panel for managing Xray/V2Ray servers; supports multiple protocols, multi‑user management, traffic and expiry controls, and administrative features.
- Marzban — a modern proxy management panel for Xray‑core with a user‑friendly web interface, supporting VLESS, VMess, Trojan, Shadowsocks, subscription links, traffic limits, and REST API integration.
- Hiddify — Multi-user anti-censorship panel supporting 20+ protocols with smart routing, multi-domain support, automatic backups, and optimizations for censored regions.
