= Jigsaw (company) =

Technology incubator created by Google

- Formerly: Google Ideas (2010–2015)
- Type: Think tank
- Founded: 2010; 16 years ago
- Founders: Eric Schmidt
- Headquarters: New York City, United States
- Key people: Yasmin Green (CEO)
- Parent: Google (2010–2015); Alphabet Inc. (2015–2020); Google (2020–present)
- Website: jigsaw.google.com

Jigsaw LLC (formerly Google Ideas) is a technology incubator created by Google. It formerly operated as an independent subsidiary of Alphabet Inc., but came under Google management in February 2020. Based in New York City, Jigsaw is dedicated to understanding global challenges and applying technological solutions. From "countering extremism", online censorship, and cyber-attacks to protecting access to information. Since July 2022, the CEO is Yasmin Green.

== History ==
=== Google Ideas ===
In 2010, Eric Schmidt approached Jared Cohen to lead Google Ideas as a "think-and-do tank" to research issues at the intersection of technology and geopolitics, and has worked on projects intended to protect activists and independent media from cyber-attacks. Ideas brought together a team of Google engineers, research scientists, product managers, and policy experts to address these issues. The team also hosted a number of conferences, including the 2017 Conflict in a Connected World Roundtable Series, in partnership with the Council on Foreign Relations' Center of Preventative Action.

Ideas came under scrutiny for its links with the US State Department and its regime change activities.

=== Jigsaw ===
In a February 2016 Medium post Eric Schmidt announced the expansion of Google Ideas into a technology incubator named Jigsaw. According to Schmidt, the new name "reflects our belief that collaborative problem-solving yields the best solutions" and the team's mission "is to use technology to tackle the toughest geopolitical challenges, from countering violent extremism to thwarting online censorship to mitigating the threats associated with digital attacks". Jigsaw was expected to leverage more of Alphabet's engineering talent and resources to build more sophisticated products. Jared Cohen, formerly with the Policy Planning Committee at the US State Department, was the CEO of Jigsaw until 2022.

In January 2023, Alphabet announced about 12,000 employees being laid off. Citing conversations with anonymous former employees, Forbes reported the Jigsaw team of 50 was reduced by somewhere between a third and a half. The company did not disclose numbers or provide employees with a reason why they were let go, but Jigsaw was not generating revenue.

== Projects ==
=== Constitute ===
In 2013, Jigsaw (then known as Google Ideas) teamed up with researchers at the University of Texas and the University of Chicago to launch Constitute, an indexed repository of national constitutions. The objective of the project is to identify a coherent set of constitutional options and sample text for those writing constitutions.

=== Perspective ===
In February 2017, Jigsaw and Google launched the free Perspective API, "a new tool for web publishers to identify toxic comments that can undermine a civil exchange of ideas". Using machine learning technology, Perspective offers a score from zero to 100 on how similar new comments are to others previously identified as toxic, defined as how likely a comment is to make someone leave a conversation. Publishers can use Perspective in a number of ways, from offering readers instant feedback on the toxicity of their comments to giving readers the power to filter conversations based on the level of toxicity they'd like to see. Jigsaw claims "its AI can immediately spit out an assessment of the phrase’s 'toxicity' more accurately than any keyword blacklist, and faster than any human moderator". Perspective's launch partners included The New York Times, The Guardian, The Economist and Wikipedia. The research on Wikipedia started discussion about Artificial intelligence in Wikimedia projects.

In June 2017, The New York Times announced that as a result of the partnership with Jigsaw, the Times would offer comments on all top stories and scale comments to 80% of its articles by the end of the year.

As of January 2026, Jigsaw stated that it was sunsetting the Perspective API (with the service ending after 2026), because "AI capabilities have evolved, and there is now less demand for a standalone tool specific to this area."

=== Project Shield ===
Project Shield is a free anti-distributed denial-of-service (anti-DDoS) service that is offered by Jigsaw to websites that have "media, elections, and human rights-related content." The main goal of the project is to serve "small, under-resourced news sites that are vulnerable to the web’s growing epidemic of DDoS attacks", according to team lead George Conard. It is similar to services offered by companies like Cloudflare. Google announced Project Shield at their Ideas Conference on 21 October 2013. The service was initially only offered to trusted testers, but on 25 February 2016, Google opened up the service to any qualifying website. The service works by having the website use Google's IPs, and traffic is routed through a Google-owned reverse proxy that identifies and filters malicious traffic.

Project Shield provides news, human rights, and election monitoring sites with protection from DDoS cyber-attacks by a system of caching (storing the data from the protected website to reduce load on the site). It also filters traffic to thwart DDoS attacks. Project Shield is built on Google Cloud Platform. It is provided free of charge to the qualifying websites of independent journalists, human rights, and elections monitoring websites to protect them regardless of their location and Project Shield as of 2016 October has users in Europe, Asia, North America, and Africa. Project Shield rescued Brian Krebs's security blog from a then-unprecedented DDoS attack that knocked the website entirely offline.

In March 2017, Jigsaw launched a campaign called "Protect Your Election", a suite of free tools to help protect access to information during elections. These tools include Shield, Password Alert, and two-step verification.

=== Redirect Method ===
The Redirect Method is an open source methodology developed by Jigsaw in partnership, with Moonshot CVE, that leverages Google's AdWords platform and YouTube to target potential ISIS recruits and dissuade them from joining the group.

Jigsaw claims that during a pilot project conducted in early 2016, its advertising was three to four times more effective than a normal campaign, and "those who clicked spent more than twice as long viewing the most effective playlists than the best estimates of how long people view YouTube as a whole." Jigsaw published the detailed steps for the methodology under a Creative Commons license on a GitHub repository. Initially piloted against ISIS, the Redirect Method has since been deployed against white supremacists and disinformation in partnership with groups such as the Anti-Defamation League and Moonshot CVE.

=== Outline ===
Outline is an open-source tool that lets news organizations provide their network of journalists safer access to the internet, powered by Shadowsocks. Jigsaw claims the VPN software can be set up on one's own server in a matter of minutes, even if the user is not technically savvy. According to WIRED, "Outline aims to provide an alternative to, on the one hand, stronger anonymity tools like Tor that slow down web browsing by bouncing connections through multiple encrypted hops around the world and, on the other hand, commercial VPNs that can be expensive, and also put users' private information and internet history at risk." WIRED adds that because administrators can add unlimited secret keys, "Outline [is] an easy way to run a VPN for an entire organization, like a group of activists or journalists." Another feature is that Outline requires minimal upkeep, as "a feature called Watchtower automatically checks for security updates and installs them."

=== Intra ===
Intra, launched 3 October 2018, is a DNS over HTTPS client for Android versions 4.0 and above that helps protect against DNS manipulation attacks and SNI sniffing attacks typically employed by Internet Service Providers to censor websites, apps, and games.

=== Other projects ===
Other Jigsaw projects include Detox, Sideways Dictionary, Password Alert, Unfiltered.news, Digital Attack Map, and Montage (graduated to Storyful).

In 2016, Jigsaw worked with the Wikimedia Foundation on Detox, a project using Machine learning to help better understand online harassment on Wikipedia, with application to other web platforms. The tool was removed in 2019, however, due to concerns about its accuracy.

In March 2017, Jigsaw partnered with The Washington Post to launch Sideways Dictionary, a community-driven collection of analogies to explain complex tech jargon. Sideways Dictionary is available as a Chrome extension and on The Washington Post.

Password Alert helps protect against phishing attacks; according to WIRED, "the company developed it for Syrian activists targeted by government-friendly hackers, but when it proved effective, it was rolled out to all of Google’s users."

Unfiltered.news "uses Google News data to show users what topics are being under-reported or are popular in regions around the world", and the Digital Attack Map displays the top digital attacks in the world in real time.

Montage is a program that "lets war correspondents and nonprofits crowdsource the analysis of YouTube videos to track conflicts and gather evidence of human rights violations." In May 2016, Jigsaw announced it had partnered with Vice News on a five-part documentary series called Blackout to examine free expression around the world.

Jigsaw also helped develop CopCast, an open-source project that can turn any Android phone into a body-worn camera system for law enforcement. In June 2017, USA Today reported that the Jersey City Police Department would scale this technology to more than 250 officers.

== See also ==
- uProxy
- Project Shield
