= Contour =

Contour may refer to:

- Contour (linguistics), a phonetic sound
- Pitch contour
- Contour (camera system), a 3D digital camera system
- Contour Airlines
- Contour flying, a form of low level flight
- Contour, the KDE Plasma 4 interface for tablet devices
- Contour line, a curve along which the function has a constant value
- Contour drawing, an artistic technique
- A closed path in the mathematical method of contour integration
- Boundary (topology) of a set

Contours may refer to:

- Contours (album), by Sam Rivers
- The Contours, a soul music group

Contouring may refer to:

- The makeup technique contouring

== Other uses ==
- CONTOUR, a failed NASA space probe
- Contour (towers), a residential development under construction in Manchester, England
- Contour, a North Wing Apache ultralight aircraft variant
- Ford Contour, a motor car

== See also ==
- Contour fort, a type of British Iron Age hillfort
