= Moonshot (company) =

Tech company

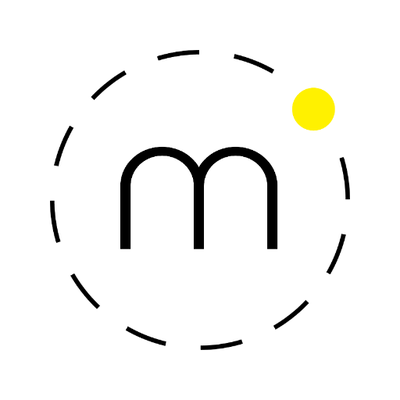
- Type: Startup
- Founded: 2015; 11 years ago
- Founders: Vidhya Ramalingam, Ross Frenett
- Website: moonshotteam.com

Moonshot is a tech startup founded in 2015. Originally established to understand and counter violent extremism, Moonshot works on a range of activities such as conspiracy theories, gender based violence and human trafficking. Based in London, the company maintains offices in Canada, the US, and Ireland and works in countries such as Libya, New Zealand and Bangladesh.

== Activities ==
Moonshot builds technology to analyse audiences consuming extremist content, conspiracy theories and disinformation.

In addition to data analysis, Moonshot engages in campaigns to direct users attempting to access extremist material to alternative sources. Moonshot developed this method, known as the Redirect Method, in partnership with Jigsaw in 2016. Initially piloted against ISIS, this methodology has since been deployed against white supremacists and disinformation. In 2025, Moonshot began working with professional sports organisations, including partnerships in U.S. women’s basketball, to monitor online abuse, harassment, and threats targeting athletes.

== Funding ==
Moonshot receives funding from technology companies such as Google and Facebook. Moonshot also engages in paid work on behalf of governments such as the UK, Canada and Japan.

The company re-invests its profits back into research and development. Moonshot is venture-backed, having raised a Series A funding round in 2021 to support scaling and technology development.
