= GoAgent =

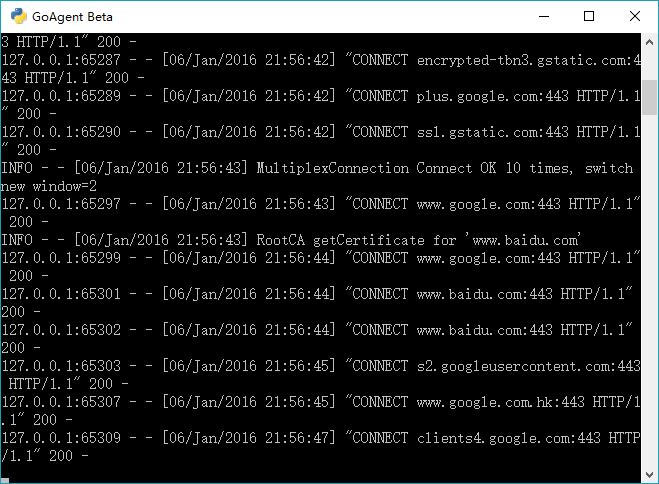
- GoAgent Beta screenshot
- Developers: phus.lu, HewigOvens
- Final release: 3.2.3 (November 22, 2014; 11 years ago) [±]
- Repository: github.com/goagent/goagent
- Written in: Python
- Operating system: Cross-platform
- Type: Proxy server
- License: GPL v2
- Website: goagent.github.io (defunct)

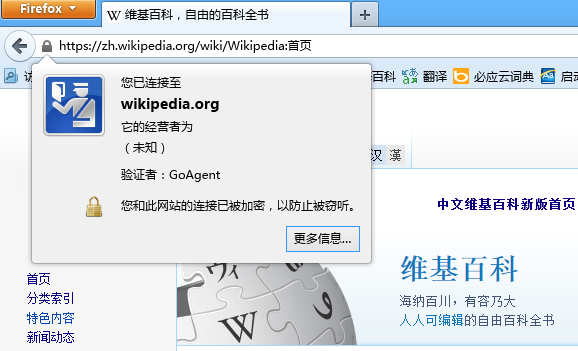
Chinese Wikipedia main page with GoAgent validation certificate in the Firefox web browser

GoAgent is a GNU GPL open-source cross-platform network access software. It is mainly written with Python and supports Windows, OS X, Linux and most Linux-based OS like Android and OpenWrt. It uses Google App Engine servers to provide users with a free proxy service to gain access to blocked information. It is normally used with web browsers.

GoAgent was eventually shut down at the request of Chinese law enforcement. A project called XX-Net claims to be "A Reborn GoAgent", with its first release in January 2015.
