= Jared Cohen =

American businessman and consultant

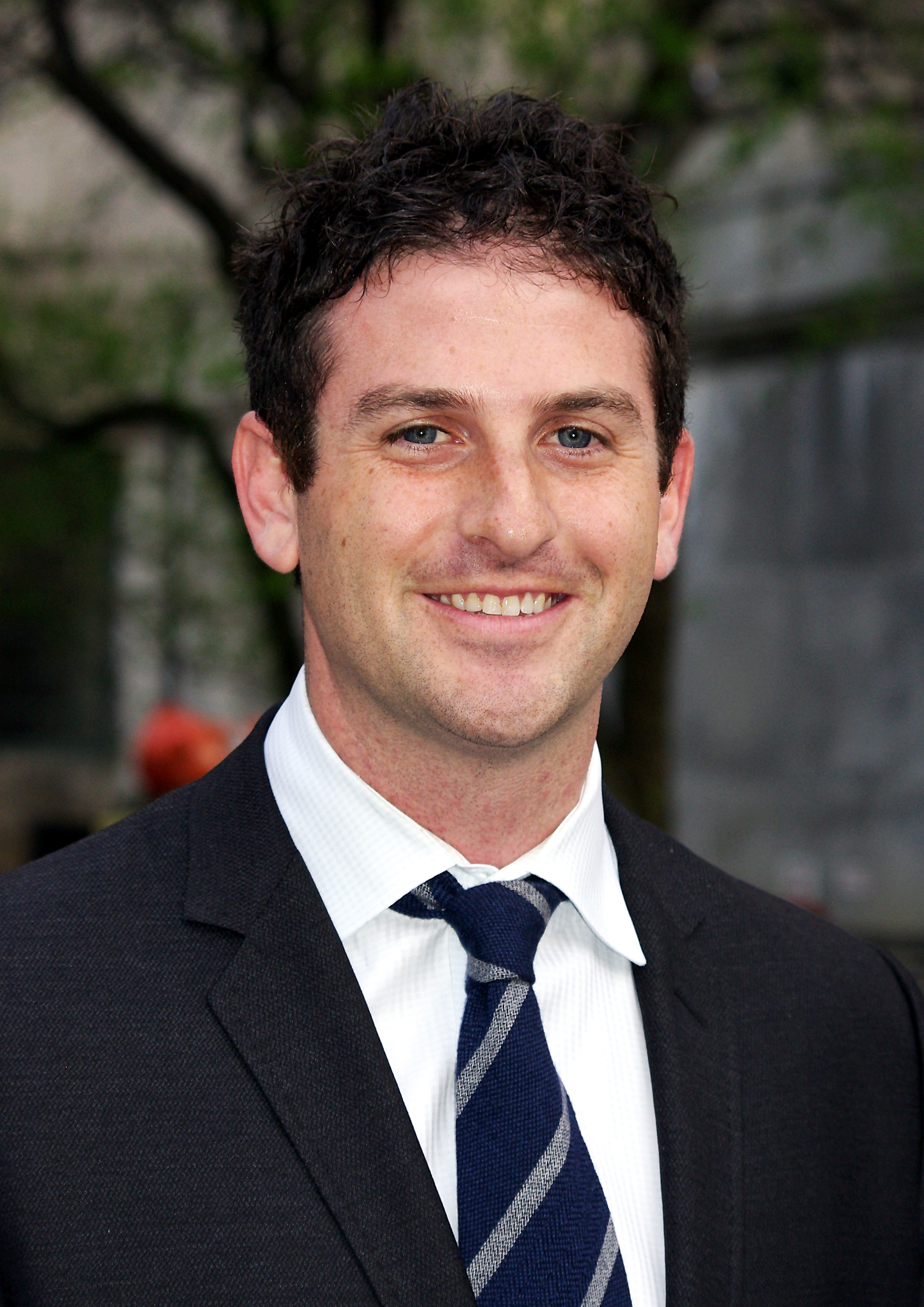
- Cohen at the 2011 Tribeca Film Festival Vanity Fair
- Born: Jared Andrew Cohen; November 24, 1981 (age 44); Weston, Connecticut, U.S.
- Education: Stanford University; Oxford University
- Employer: Goldman Sachs
- Organization(s): Goldman Sachs, Council on Foreign Relations
- Known for: Founder and former CEO of Jigsaw at Google
- Spouse: Rebecca Zubaty
- Children: 3

Jared Andrew Cohen (born November 24, 1981) is an American businessman and presidential historian serving as the President of Global Affairs and co-head of the Goldman Sachs Global Institute at Goldman Sachs, which he joined in August 2022 as a Partner and member of the firm's Management Committee. He is also an Adjunct Senior Fellow at the Council on Foreign Relations. Previously, he was the founder and the CEO of Jigsaw (formerly Google Ideas). Prior to that, he served as a member of the Secretary of State's Policy Planning Staff and as an advisor to Condoleezza Rice and later Hillary Clinton. Brought in by Condoleezza Rice as a member of the Policy Planning Staff, he was one of a few staffers that stayed under Hillary Clinton. In this capacity, he focused on counter-terrorism, counter-radicalization, Middle East/South Asia, Internet freedom, and fostering opposition in repressive countries.

According to The New York Times Magazine, right before his departure Cohen was one of the architects of what was labeled in 2010 as "21st century statecraft" along with Richard Boly and several foreign service officers in the Department of State's Office of eDiplomacy In 2013, Cohen was named by Time as one of its 100 most influential people.

== Early life and education ==
Cohen was born to a Jewish family in Weston, Connecticut. Cohen received a bachelor's degree from Stanford University in 2004. He majored in history and political science and minored in African studies. He subsequently earned a master's degree in international relations from Oxford University, where he studied as a Rhodes Scholar.

== Career ==
Before graduating college, Cohen pursued interests in government and in mass media. He was an intern at the U.S. State Department.

=== U.S. State Department ===
Following his internship and graduation, Cohen served as a member of the Secretary of State's Policy Planning Staff from 2006 to 2010. He was 24 years of age. His service began after his internship under former U.S. Secretary of State Condoleezza Rice, during the Bush administration.

Cohen was one of the few members of Policy Planning kept on by Secretary of State Hillary Clinton. He played a role in helping shape counter-radicalization strategies and advised on US policy towards Iran and the Middle East. Beginning in April 2009, Cohen aided delegations focused on connecting technology executives with local stakeholders in Iraq, Russia, Mexico, Congo, and Syria.

In the midst of the June 2009 protests in Iran, Cohen sought to support the opposition in Iran. He contacted Twitter, requesting that the company not perform planned maintenance that would have temporarily shut down service in Iran, because the protestors were using Twitter to maintain contact with the outside world. According to The New Yorker Ryan Lizza, "The move violated Obama's rule of non-interference, and White House officials were furious." In an interview with Clinton, she "did not betray any disagreement with the President over Iran policy," but "cited Cohen's move with pride."

While serving on the Policy Planning Staff, Cohen became an advisor to Richard Holbrooke, who was the first Special Representative for Afghanistan and Pakistan. He took several trips with Holbrooke to Afghanistan, where he helped develop some of the early strategic communications strategies.

Cohen was among the early adopters of social media in the U.S. government. In April 2010, Cohen had the third largest number of Twitter followers in the US government, behind Barack Obama and John McCain. By September 2013, he was no longer in the top 20.

=== Google ===
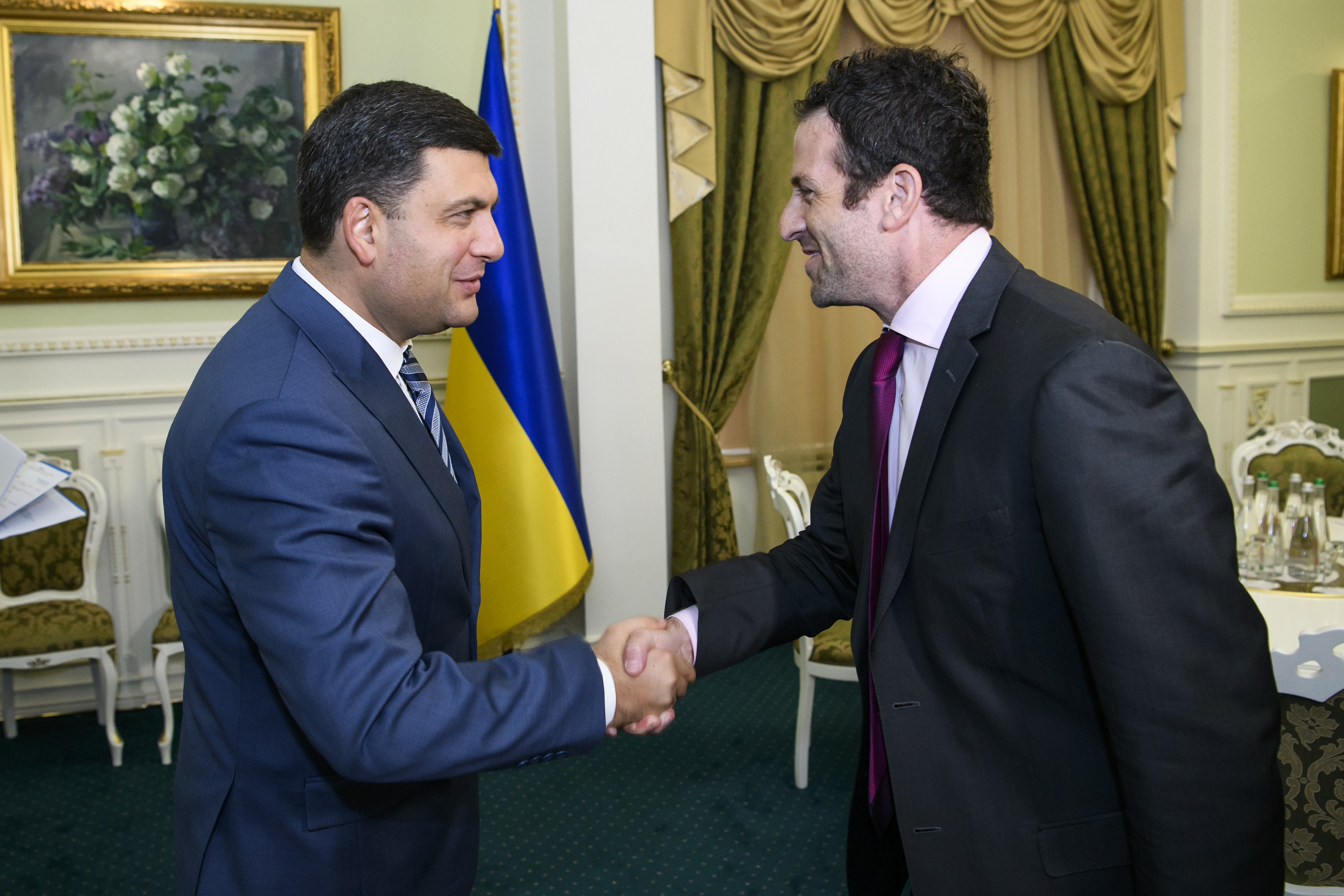
Cohen with Volodymyr Groysman in Ukraine.

Cohen left the State Department's Policy Planning staff on 2 September 2010. On 7 September 2010, Cohen became an adjunct senior fellow at The Council on Foreign Relations focusing on counter-radicalization. He was hired as the first director of Google Ideas, a new branch within Google, in mid-October 2010. With the creation of Alphabet, Google Ideas spun out into Jigsaw, which Cohen founded and led until 2022. Jigsaw is tasked with "invest[ing] in and build[ing] technology to address humanity's most intractable problems, from countering violent extremism to online censorship, to expand[ing] access to information for the world’s most vulnerable populations and to defend[ing] against the world’s most challenging security threats."

According to a Fast Company article, "Jigsaw’s employees are a mix of engineers and researchers, who have built out a portfolio of more than a dozen products."

Wired wrote that "The New York–based think tank and tech incubator aims to build products that use Google's massive infrastructure and engineering muscle not to advance the best possibilities of the Internet but to fix the worst of it: surveillance, extremist indoctrination, censorship."

According to a 2019 Vice Motherboard report, "Current and former Jigsaw employees describe a toxic workplace environment, mismanagement, poor leadership, HR complaints that haven't resulted in action, retaliation against employees who speak up, and a chronic failure to retain talent, particularly women engineers and researchers. Sources describe a place full of well-intentioned people who are undermined by their own leaders; an organization that, despite the breathless headlines it has garnered, has done little to actually make the internet any better."

In June 2022, Cohen addressed the UN Security Council, warning that Russian cyberattacks, disinformation and other forms of information warfare being waged in Ukraine are a “crystal ball” for future problems elsewhere. He called for states to "find a way to turn the volume down and settle on some kind of deterrence doctrine for the cyber domain."

In a July 2012 email to members of Clinton's team Cohen reportedly sent to Clinton said: “My team is planning to launch a tool on Sunday that will publicly track and map the defections in Syria and which parts of the government they are coming from.”

=== Techno-democracy ===
According to the Washington Post's David Ignatius, the concept of "techno-democracy" was first articulated in detail in a November (2020) article in Foreign Affairs, which Cohen co-authored with Richard Fontaine. "The concept is anchored on the creation of a 'T-12' group of advanced democracies that would work together to compete with China on issues related to technology." Ignatius writes, "it has the strong backing of Secretary of State Antony Blinken and National Security Advisor Jake Sullivan."

=== Goldman Sachs ===
In July 2022, Goldman Sachs CEO David Solomon announced that the firm had hired Cohen as the firm's President of Global Affairs and co-head of a new Office of Applied Innovation. Cohen officially joined in August as a Partner and member of the firm's Management Committee. In October 2023, he co-founded the Goldman Sachs Global Institute along with George Lee. The Office of Applied Innovation now serves as the Institute's unit focused on emerging technologies.

On October 22, 2022, Cohen traveled to Ukraine to meet with President Volodymyr Zelenskyy. This visit was the first in-person meeting between the President and the U.S. financial sector since the war began on February 24 that year.

== Books ==
=== Life After Power ===
Cohen's latest book is Life After Power: Seven Presidents and Their Search for Purpose Beyond the White House was published in 2024 and is a New York Times Bestseller. The book examines the postpresidential lives of seven chief executives (Thomas Jefferson, John Quincy Adams, Grover Cleveland, William Howard Taft, Herbert Hoover, Jimmy Carter and George W. Bush).

Historian Richard Norton Smith, in his Wall Street Journal review of the book, wrote, "Mr. Cohen shows himself to be a gifted artist in his own right. If some chapters of Life After Power suggest anthologized history, his postpresidential portraits of Mr. Carter and, especially, Mr. Bush, make this book that rarity—a highly readable sequel that confirms the promise of the author’s earlier work."

=== Accidental Presidents ===
Accidental Presidents: Eight Men Who Changed America was written by Cohen in 2019 and is a New York Times Bestseller. According to the Guardian it is "a history of eight vice-presidents who stepped up when their president was removed by fate. It covers the assassinations everyone knows, Lincoln and Kennedy, those some may not, Garfield and McKinley, and what happened when presidents died from natural causes: Harrison, Taylor, Harding, Roosevelt."

=== The New Digital Age ===
The New Digital Age: Re-shaping the Future of People, Nations and Business co-authored with Google Executive Chairman Eric Schmidt, was a New York Times bestseller. The book considers the geopolitical future when 5 billion additional people come online, and the presumed terrorism, war, identity theft, conflict and altered relations between nations that the authors say will result. The book grew out of an article, "The Digital Disruption", which was published in Foreign Affairs magazine in November 2010. Cohen and Schmidt suggest that technology will rewrite the relationship between states and their citizens in the 21st century.

Julian Assange wrote critically of the book:

[It] proselytizes the role of technology in reshaping the world's people and nations into likenesses of the world's dominant superpower, whether they want to be reshaped or not. The prose is terse, the argument confident and the wisdom — banal ... This book is a balefully seminal work in which neither author has the language to see, much less to express, the titanic centralizing evil they are constructing.

Another critical review by Evgeny Morozov in The New Republic stated:

Schmidt and Cohen dispatch their quirky examples in such large doses that readers unfamiliar with the latest literature on technology and new media might accidentally find them innovative and persuasive. In reality, though, many of their examples—especially those from exotic foreign lands—are completely removed from their context. It is nice to be told that innovators at the MIT Media Lab are planning to distribute tablets to children in Ethiopia, but why not tell us that this project follows in the steps of One Laptop Per Child, one of the most high-profile failures of technological utopianism in the last decade? Absent such disclosure, the Ethiopian tablet project looks much more promising—and revolutionary—than it actually is ... Just a modicum of research could have saved this exercise in irresponsible futurology, but living in the future, Cohen and Schmidt do not much care about the present, which leads them likely to overstate their own originality ... This reveals only how little they know about the world of reporters and NGO workers who actually work in places such as Burma, Iran, and Belarus.

=== Early books ===
Cohen's first book, One Hundred Days of Silence: America and the Rwanda Genocide, was published in 2006 by Rowman & Littlefield and chronicles U.S. policy toward Rwanda during the 1994 Genocide.

His second book, Children of Jihad: A Young American's Travels Among the Youth of the Middle East, was published by Penguin Books (Gotham) in October 2007 and has also been published as an audio book and translated into Dutch and Italian.

He and co-author Eric Schmidt published "The Dark Side of the Digital Revolution" in the Wall Street Journal in 2013, and a 2012 article for The Washington Post, entitled "Technology Can Be Harnessed to Fight Drug Cartels in Mexico," which grew out of a trip the two took to Ciudad Juárez.

== Other activities ==
Cohen has been involved in the Tribeca Film Festival, serving as a juror in multiple categories over a number of years.

== Personal life ==
He is married to Rebecca Zubaty. They have three daughters.
