= Against Violent Extremism =

- Founded: April 25, 2011; 15 years ago

Against Violent Extremism (AVE) is a global network of former extremists, survivors of violence and interested individuals from the public and private sectors - working together to counter all forms of violent extremism. A partnership between London’s Institute for Strategic Dialogue, Google Ideas and the Gen Next Foundation. AVE's stated aim is to offer a platform for communication, collaboration and a means for activists to find resources and funding for projects.

== Origins ==
AVE has its origins in the Summit Against Violent Extremism (SAVE), held in Dublin in the summer of 2011. The first major initiative by Google Ideas, SAVE brought together former extremists and survivors of violent extremism from around the world. The summit saw discussion of the common ground between different extremists, patterns of radicalisation and the factors leading people to leave violent groups.

A common theme throughout the event was how much those working to prevent different types of extremism had to learn from one another. On the back of the conversations at SAVE, a permanent global network of former extremists and survivors of violent extremism called Against Violent Extremism was established. This network was officially launched by Google Ideas in New York in April 2012.

== Goals ==
The network aims to amplify the voices of former extremists and survivors in an effective way to counter radicalisation. It aims to do so in three ways:

=== Networking ===
In bringing together a global network of former extremists of all ideologies with survivors of violence, AVE aims to facilitate the ‘cross pollination' of ideas between members in a way that makes all more effective. The inclusion of interested individuals from the private and public sector facilitates the exchange of dialogue and best practice.

=== Support ===
Drawing on its contacts across different sectors, the network provides practical support for grassroots projects working to tackle extremism at a community level.

=== Advocacy ===
AVE advocates for the positive role that former extremists and survivors can play in preventing violent extremism.

== Organisation ==
AVE is managed on a day-to-day basis by the London-based think tank Institute for Strategic Dialogue, who formally took over the management of the network from Google Ideas in February 2012. The network is entirely private sector funded with funding and strategic support supplied by Google Ideas and the US-based Gen Next Foundation. The network also benefits from website and technical support supplied by Belfast-based Rehab Studio.

== High Profile Members ==
AVE has over 450 former extremists and survivors of violent extremism from around the world. Some high-profile examples include:

- Maajid Nawaz Formerly of the Islamist group Hizb ut-Tahrir
- Jo Berry A survivor of the Brighton hotel bombing in 1984.
- Vera Grabe Former member and co-founder of Colombian Guerilla M-19
- Jack Roche Muslim convert and former Islamic extremist charged with plotting to bomb the Israeli Embassy in Canberra in 2000.
- Carrie Lemack Co-Founder of Families Of September 11
- Mubin Shaikh Former Islamist who went on to work for the Canadian Security Intelligence Service.
- Christian Picciolini Former neo-Nazi skinhead leader, co-founder of anti-racism nonprofit Life After Hate, author of Romantic Violence Memoirs of an American Skinhead.

== Criticism ==
There has been criticism that the project, which brings former extremists into the fold, has been naïve in overstating the impact they can have. More broadly, there is also scepticism surrounding the organization's claims that lessons learnt in tackling gang violence in Los Angeles could be adapted to tackling the threat of Islamist extremism in Islamabad.
