= UProxy =

Web proxy browser extension

uProxy was an extension for Chrome and Firefox, which allowed users to access the Internet via a web proxy. This project has been superseded by Snowflake (software). The extension works by enabling a user to share their Internet connection with someone else. Google Ideas provided funding for the development which was carried out by the University of Washington and Brave New Software — the same organization behind the anti-censorship tool Lantern. The extension is intended to allow users to get more secure access to the Internet without being monitored. It is free/libre software under Apache license 2.0. The software has been discontinued, stating on their website " uProxy was an open source project led by the University of Washington and seeded by Jigsaw. Although the project is no longer supported, the code is still available on GitHub."

== See also ==
- Great Firewall of China
- Ultrasurf
