= Shadowsocks =

Free and open-source encrypted proxy project

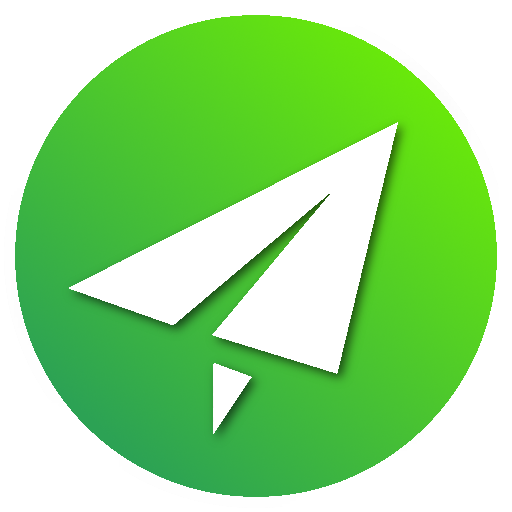
- Original author: Clowwindy
- Release: 20 April 2012; 14 years ago

Stable release(s) [±]
- rust: 1.18.3 / 21 April 2024; 2 years ago
- windows: 4.4.1.0 / 8 February 2022; 4 years ago
- android: 5.3.3 / 7 February 2023; 3 years ago
- X-NG: 1.10.2 / 29 March 2023; 3 years ago
- Written in: Python; Rust; C#; Kotlin; Swift; Objective-C; C; Go; C++
- Operating system: Unix-like operating system Microsoft Windows; Android iOS
- Type: communication protocol free software Internet censorship circumvention trademark
- License: MIT License
- Website: shadowsocks.org
- Repository: github.com/shadowsocks/shadowsocks-rust

Shadowsocks is a free and open-source encryption protocol project, widely used in China to circumvent Internet censorship. It was created in 2012 by a Chinese programmer named "clowwindy", and multiple implementations of the protocol have been made available since. Shadowsocks provides an encrypted equivalent of a SOCKS proxy. A Shadowsocks client converts the Shadowsocks connection to SOCKS5 for local use. Unlike an SSH port forwarding, Shadowsocks can also proxy User Datagram Protocol (UDP) traffic.

== Takedown ==
On 22 August 2015, "clowwindy" announced in a GitHub thread that they had been contacted by the police and could no longer maintain the project. The code of the project was subsequently branched with a removal notice. Three days later, on 25 August, another proxy application, GoAgent, also had its GitHub repository removed. The removal of the projects received media attention, with some speculating about a possible connection between those removals and a distributed-denial-of-service attack targeting GitHub which occurred several days later. Danny O'Brien, from Electronic Frontier Foundation, published a statement on the matter.

Despite the takedown, collaborators of the project have continued the development of the project.

== Server implementations ==
The original Python implementation can still be installed using the Pip Python package manager, but the contents of its GitHub repository have been removed. Other server implementations include one in Go, Rust, and C using the libev event loop library; C++ with a Qt GUI; and Perl. The C, Go and Perl implementations are not updated regularly and may have been abandoned.

== Client implementations ==
All of the server implementations listed above also support operating in client mode. There are also client-only implementations available for Windows (shadowsocks-win), macOS (ShadowsocksX-NG), Android (shadowsocks-android), and iOS (Wingy). Many clients, including shadowsocks-win and shadowsocks-android, support redirecting all system traffic over Shadowsocks, not just applications that have been explicitly configured to do so, allowing Shadowsocks to be used similarly to a VPN. If an application doesn't support proxy servers, a proxifier can be used to redirect the application to the Shadowsocks client. Some proxifiers, such as Proxycap, support Shadowsocks directly, thus avoiding the need for a Shadowsocks client, but some require a client.

== Net::Shadowsocks ==
Net::Shadowsocks is name of the Perl implementation of Shadowsocks protocol client and server available on CPAN.

== ShadowsocksR ==
ShadowsocksR is a fork of the original Shadowsocks project, claimed to be superior in terms of security and stability. Upon release, it was found to violate the License by not having the source code of the C# client available. It was also criticized for its solution to the alleged security issues in the source project. Shadowsocks is currently under development, while development of ShadowsocksR has stopped.

== Similar projects ==
Shadowsocks is similar to The Tor Project's Pluggable Transport (PT) idea. PT makes it hard for Internet Service Providers to detect Tor traffic. They also both use a socks proxy interface. Whereas Shadowsocks is simpler, Obfs4 used in PT is more obfuscated. Unlike Obfs4, Shadowsocks is not resistant to Active Probing. The most similar PT to Shadowsocks is Obfs3.

The V2Ray framework adds obfuscation on top of traffic encryption.

== See also ==
- Great Firewall
- Internet censorship in China
- Outline VPN
