= French submarine Morse (1925) =

French submarine

Morse
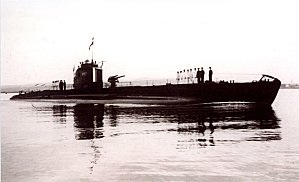
- Morse in 1939

History

France
- Name: Morse
- Namesake: walrus
- Builder: Arsenal de Cherbourg
- Laid down: 12 February 1923
- Launched: 9 May 1925
- Commissioned: 10 February 1928
- Fate: Mined and sunk off Kerkenna on 16 June 1940.

General characteristics
- Class & type: Requin-class submarine
- Displacement: 1,150 long tons (1,168 t) (surfaced); 1,441 long tons (1,464 t) (submerged)
- Length: 78.30 m (256 ft 11 in)
- Beam: 6.84 m (22 ft 5 in)
- Draught: 5.10 m (16 ft 9 in)
- Propulsion: 2 × diesel engines, 2,900 hp (2,163 kW); 2 × electric motors, 1,800 hp (1,342 kW)
- Speed: 15 knots (28 km/h) (surfaced); 9 knots (17 km/h) (submerged)
- Range: 7,700 nautical miles (14,300 km) at 9 knots (17 km/h); 70 nautical miles (130 km) at 5 knots (9.3 km/h) (submerged)
- Test depth: 80 m (260 ft)
- Complement: 51 men
- Armament: 10 × 550 mm (21.7 in) torpedo tubes; 1 × 100 mm (3.9 in) deck gun; 2 × 8 mm (0.31 in) machine guns

The French submarine Morse was a Requin-class submarine built for the French Navy in the mid-1920s. Laid down in February 1923, it was launched in May 1925 and commissioned in February 1928. On 16 June 1940, Morse, under the command of Jean Georges Charles Paris, struck a mine and sank in the same minefield off the Kerkennah Islands that sank her sister ship Narval six months later.

== Design ==
Measuring 78 m (255 ft 11 in) long, with a beam of 6.8 m (22 ft 4 in) and a draught of 5.1 m (16 ft 9 in), Requin-class submarines could dive up to 80 m (260 ft). The submarine had a surfaced displacement of 1,150 long tons (1,168 t) and a submerged displacement of 1,441 long tons (1,464 t).

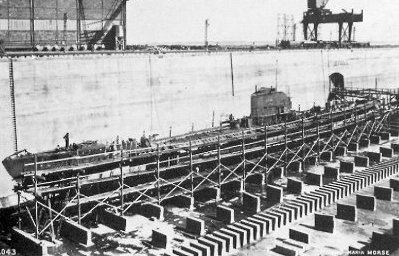
Morse under construction.

Propulsion while surfaced was provided by two 2,900 hp (2,163 kW) diesel motors and two 1,800 hp (1,342 kW) electric motors. The submarines' electrical propulsion allowed it to attain speeds of 9 knots (17 km/h; 10 mph) while submerged and 15 knots (28 km/h; 17 mph) on the surface. Their surfaced range was 7,700 nautical miles (14,300 km) at 9 knots (17 km/h), and 4,000 nautical miles (7,400 km) at 12 knots (22 km/h), with a submerged range of 70 nautical miles (130 km) at 5 knots (9.3 km/h).

== Service ==
From 1935 to 1937, Morse underwent a thorough overhaul. At the outbreak of World War II, she served in the Mediterranean Sea and was part of the 4th Submarine Flotilla in Bizerte. Morse's commander at the time was Captain J.G.C. Paris. In June 1940, Morse was still based in Bizerte. Morse blew up on a mine in the same minefield off the Kerkennah Islands that sank her sister ship Narval six months later.
