= Admiralty (navy) =

An Admiralty is a governmental and/or naval body responsible for the administration of a navy.

== List of Admiralties ==
=== Germany ===
- German Imperial Admiralty, Kaiserliche Admiralität
- German Imperial Admiralty Staff, Admiralstab

=== Netherlands ===
- Admiralty of Amsterdam
- Admiralty of Friesland
- Admiralty of the Noorderkwartier (also called the "Admiralty of West-Friesland")
- Admiralty of Rotterdam (also called the "Admiralty of de Maze")
- Admiralty of Zeeland

=== Russia ===
- Admiralty Board (Russian Empire), the authority responsible for the Imperial Russian Navy
  - Admiralty Shipyard, a former Imperial admiralty, the Main Admiralty, today a shipyard in Saint Petersburg, Russia

=== United Kingdom ===
- Admiralty in the 16th century - the Admiralty and Marine Affairs Office (1546-1707)
- Admiralty (United Kingdom), a former military department in command of the Royal Navy from 1707 to 1964
- Admiralty Board (United Kingdom), the post-1964 board responsible for the Royal Navy
- Board of Admiralty, the board responsible for the Royal Navy from 1628 to 1964
- Royal Maritime Auxiliary Service, commonly referred to as the Admiralty
- United Kingdom Hydrographic Office, produces the Admiralty brand of charts
