= Institute for Strategic Dialogue =

Think tank

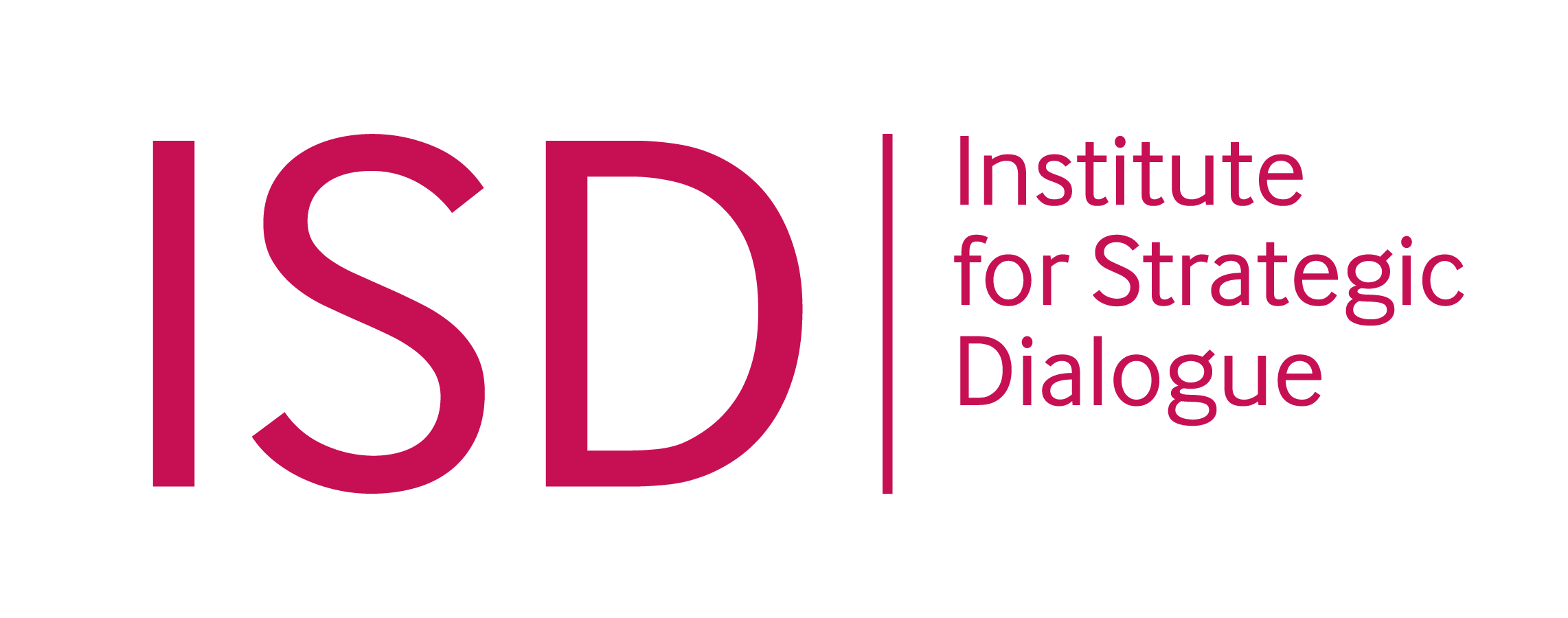
- Formation: 2006; 20 years ago
- Founder: Sasha Havlicek, George Weidenfeld
- Headquarters: London, England
- CEO: Sasha Havlicek
- Managing Director: Arabella Phillimore
- Key people: Rashad Ali, Zahed Amanullah, Moustafa Ayad, Kelsey Bjornsgaard, Milo Comerford, Jiore Craig, Jacob Davey, Julia Ebner, Aoife Gallagher, Jakob Guhl, Jared Holt, Katherine Keneally, Jennie King, Ciaran O'Connor, C. Dixon Osburn, Lucie Parker, Melanie Smith, Tim Squirrell, Elise Thomas, Henry Tuck, Huberta von Voss
- Budget: £7m GBP
- Staff: 120
- Website: www.isdglobal.org

The Institute for Strategic Dialogue (ISD) is a political advocacy organization founded in 2006 by Sasha Havlicek and George Weidenfeld and headquartered in London, United Kingdom.

The ISD and Alliance for Securing Democracy announced in December 2025 that they would be merging under the ISD-US banner effective 1 January 2026.

== Activities ==
ISD's core activities range from traditional research output and policy advice to the facilitation of youth and practitioner networks and the development of counternarrative and technological tools to combat extremism. More recently, ISD has researched misinformation and disinformation involving climate change, public health, election integrity, and conspiracy networks such as QAnon.

ISD partners with a number of Western governments, including agencies in Canada, Norway, Germany, the United Kingdom, New Zealand, Australia, the United States, and the European Commission. It also works on funded projects with technology companies and organisations such as Google, Microsoft, Meta, and the Global Internet Forum to Counter Terrorism.

Other institutional partners include the Global Disinformation Index, the Berkman Klein Center for Internet & Society, Institut Montaigne, the British Council, the German Marshall Fund, the University of Ontario Institute of Technology, and the International Centre for Counter-Terrorism.

Funding for the ISD has come from the Bill & Melinda Gates Foundation, the Omidyar Network, the Gen Next Foundation, and the Open Society Foundation.

== History ==
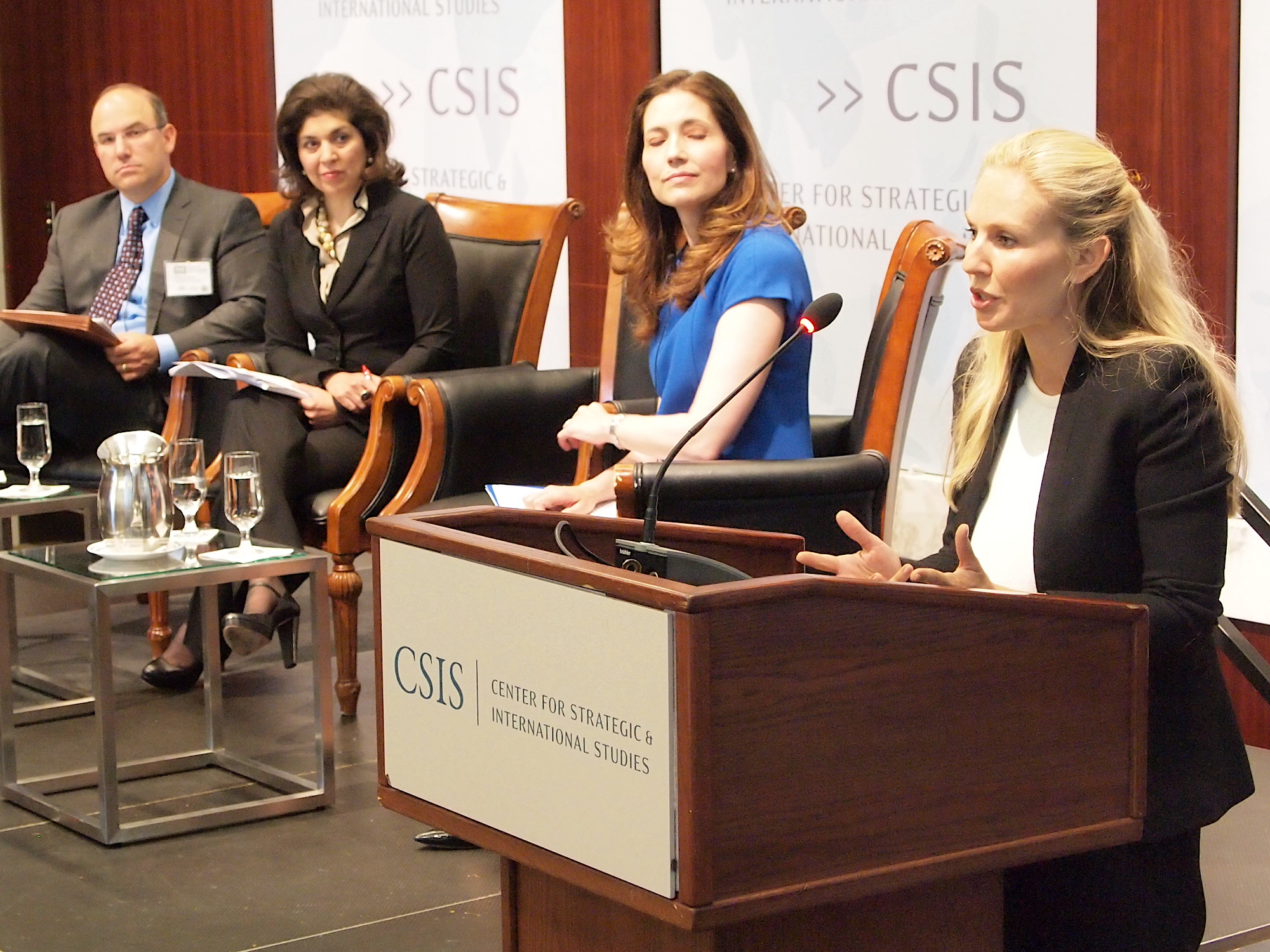
Sasha Havlicek speaks at the Center for Strategic and International Studies in Washington, D.C., with Evan Ryan, Farah Pandith and Juan Zarate, June 2015.

ISD was founded in 2006 as an extension of the Club of Three, a strategic networking organisation founded in 1996 by George Weidenfeld that focused on high-level engagement between Europe and the world. ISD originally focused on social cohesion and radicalisation following a rise of far-right and Islamist extremism in Europe. ISD later hosted the Against Violent Extremism network shortly after it was founded in 2011 in Dublin, Ireland, promoting engagement with former violent extremists as a way of understanding how extremist movements work.

By 2012, ISD was working with social media platforms such as YouTube to explore radicalisation online, including research on the use of counternarratives to minimise the impact of extremist recruitment by groups such as ISIS, Al Qaeda, and white supremacists in Europe and North America. This work later expanded to include recruitment and disruption efforts by state actors and conspiracy theorists during the COVID-19 pandemic. Much of this activity was found to be amplified during regional and national elections, leading to new research on election disruption in countries such as Germany, Sweden, France, Italy, Kenya, and the United States. ISD's analysis of the 6 January United States Capitol attack was chosen for inclusion in the Library of Congress.

The ISD and Alliance for Securing Democracy announced in December 2025 that they would be merging under the ISD-US banner effective 1 January 2026.

== Programs ==
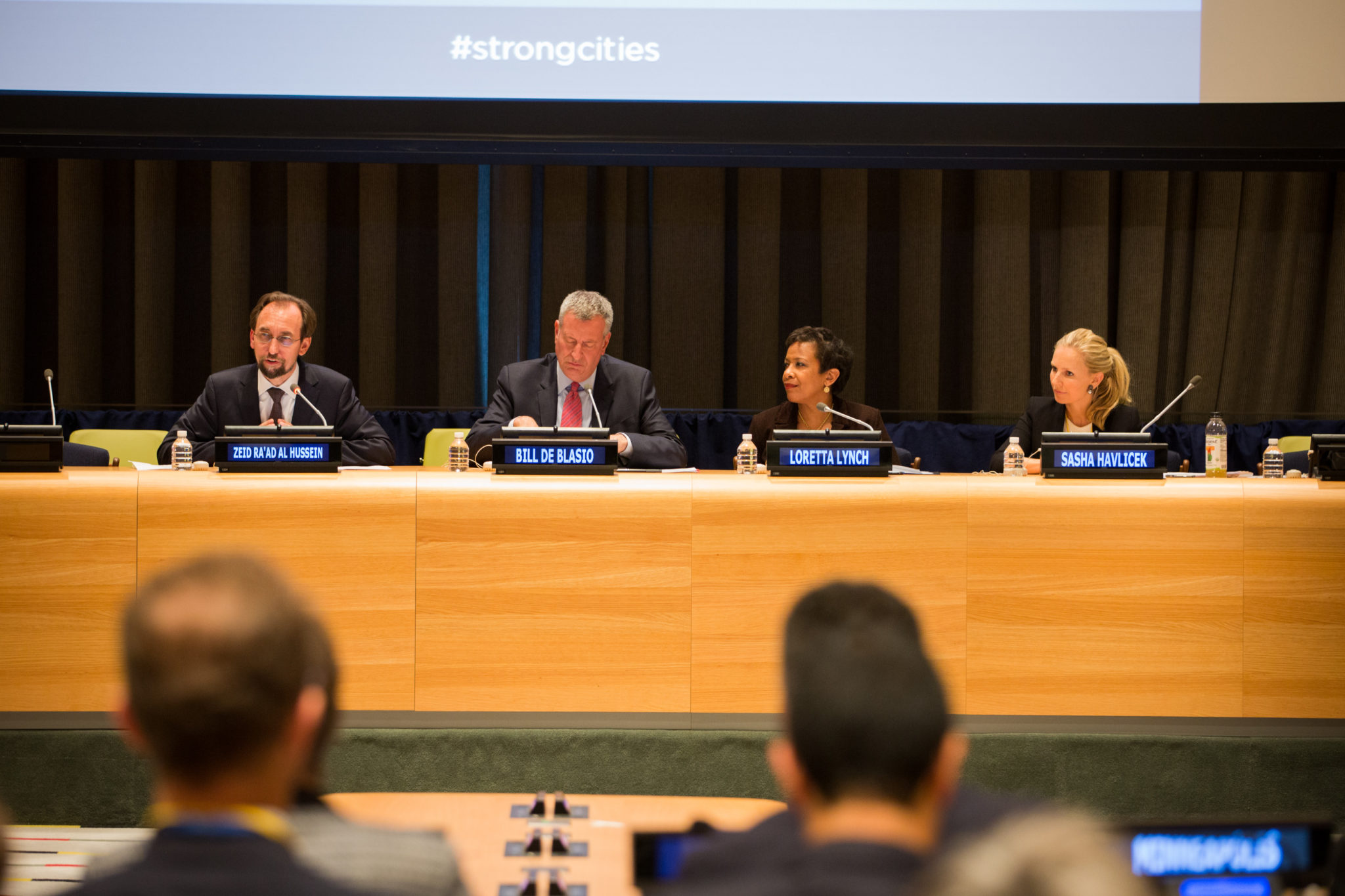
Launch of the Strong Cities Network at the United Nations General Assembly with Zeid bin Raad al Hussein, Bill de Blasio, Loretta Lynch, and Sasha Havlicek, September 2015

- Business Council for Democracy (BC4D): A joint initiative from Hertie Stiftung, Robert Bosch Stiftung, and ISD Germany, BC4D provides employee training on hate speech, disinformation, and conspiracy theories.
- Digital Policy Lab (DPL): Funded by the German Federal Foreign Office, the DPL is an intergovernmental working group focused on regulation and policy regarding disinformation, hate speech, extremism, and terrorism online.
- Beam: Developed in partnership with the Centre for Analysis of Social Media (CASM), Beam uses online surveillance technology to detect, track, and attempt to measure online manipulation, disinformation, and harassment. Beam was a winner of the 2021 U.S.-Paris Tech Challenge.
- Prevention Practitioner Network: Developed in partnership with the McCain Institute, the Prevention Practitioner Network is a national network focusing on prevention of targeted violence and terrorism within the United States.
- Strong Cities Network (SCN): Launched at the United Nations in September 2015, SCN is a global network of mayors, municipal-level policy-makers, and practitioners seeking to build social cohesion and counter violent extremism.
- Youth Civil Activism Network (YouthCAN): Launched in Oslo, Norway in 2015, YouthCAN is a global youth network of counter-extremism and social justice activists.
- Be Internet Citizens (BIC): Developed in partnership with Google in 2017, BIC is a digital literacy program for youth that aims to explain fake news, echo chambers, filter bubbles, and promote safety online, especially on YouTube.
- Shared Endeavour Fund: ISD managed an £800,000 fund, supported by Google.org and the Mayor of London Sadiq Khan, to empower communities to tackle violent extremism and a rise in hate crime offences in London.

ISD is also a member of the Christchurch Call advisory network and the Commission for Countering Extremism's Expert Group in the United Kingdom.

=== Past programs ===
- The Far-Right Extremism in Europe (FREE) Initiative
- Against Violent Extremism (AVE) network: A global network of former extremists and survivors of violence working together to counter violent extremism.
- Counter Conversations: Developed as a research project with Facebook, this initiative facilitates interventions between former extremists and young people who show extremist tendencies.
- Online Civil Courage Initiative (OCCI): A strategic partnership with Facebook, OCCI launched in Germany in 2016 and expanded to France and the UK in 2017. OCCI helps develop new responses to hate speech and violent extremism on social media
- Policy Planners’ Network (PPN): A European inter-governmental network of policy chiefs improving coordinated responses to integration and extremism.
- Innovation Fund to Counter Extremism: Launched with Google.org in 2017, this fund distributed £1M to support organisations countering hate, racism, and extremism in the UK.

ISD previously chaired the EU's Radicalisation Awareness Network (RAN) working group on the Internet and social media and has provided testimony to the US Committee on House Administration, the US Committee on Foreign Affairs, and the UK Home Affairs Select Committee.

== Selected publications ==
- Ayad, Moustafa, "The Vladimirror Network: Pro-Putin Power-Users on Facebook" (April 2022)
- O'Connor, Ciaran, "Hatescape: An In-Depth Analysis of Extremism and Hate Speech on TikTok" (August 2021)
- Miller, Carl; Smith, Melanie, Marsh, Oliver; Balint, Kata; Inskip, Chris; Visser, Francesca, "Information Warfare and Wikipedia" (October 2022)
- Davey, Jacob; Birdwell, Jonathan; Skellett, Rebecca (February 2018). "Counter-Conversations: A model for direct engagement with individuals showing signs of radicalisation online" (PDF).
- Harrasy, Anisa; Amanullah, Zahed (February 2018). "Between Two Extremes: Responding to Islamist and tribalist messaging online in Kenya during the 2017 elections" (PDF).
