= David Gorodyansky =

American entrepreneur and angel investor (born 1982)

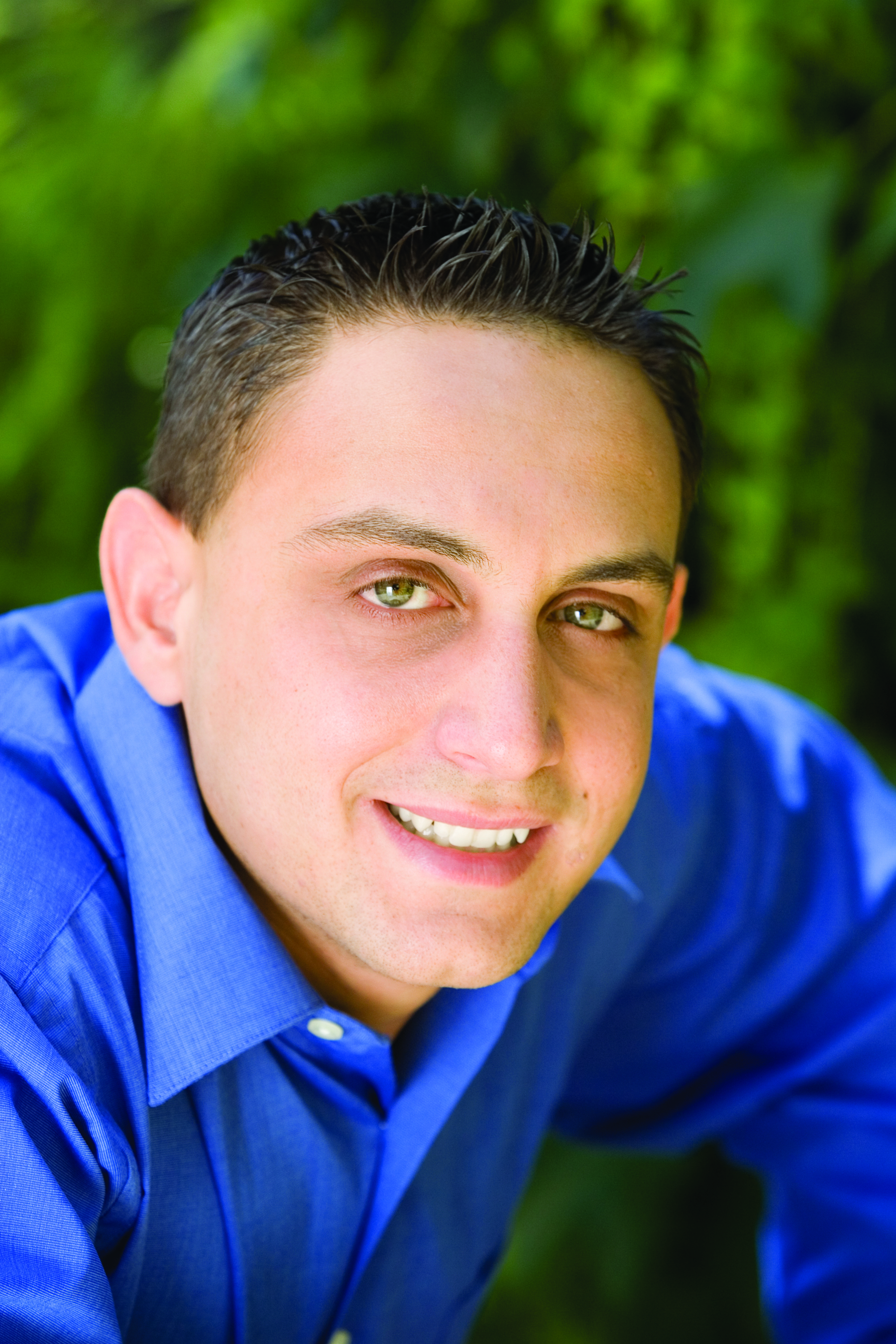
- Gorodyansky in 2006
- Born: Moscow, Russia
- Education: San Jose State University
- Occupations: Entrepreneur; Executive
- Known for: Co-founder and CEO of AnchorFree

David Gorodyansky (born February 7, 1982) is an American entrepreneur and angel investor best known as the CEO of AnchorFree, a company he co-founded in 2005 with Eugene Malobrodsky. AnchorFree is the developer of Hotspot Shield, a virtual private network provider. In 2019, Fast Company named AnchorFree the 13th most innovative company in the world and the #1 most innovative security company. AnchorFree's most recent fundraising round (2018) brought in $295 million, bringing total funding to $358 million. Gorodyansky has also invested in GlobeIn, an online exotic arts and crafts marketplace, and Venturocket, a job matching website. He is chairman of AnchorFree and GlobeIn.

Gorodyansky is a writer who has contributed to Forbes and Inc. Magazine. He is also a proponent of social entrepreneurship.

== Early life ==
Gorodyansky was born in Moscow, Russia and moved to Palo Alto, California with his parents and sister when he was 9 years old. His parents were computer engineers. His grandfather was a member of the Red Army during World War II, during which he conducted aerial reconnaissance and helped to liberate German concentration camps.

While attending a local Palo Alto school, Gorodyansky met Eugene Malobrodsky. Malobrodsky had a similar background and the two became close friends. The two would later found multiple companies together.

== Career ==
In 2002, while still in college, Gorodyansky founded Intelligent Buying with Malobrodsky. Intelligent Buying was a company that resold high-end computer equipment. They exited the company in 2005 in order to "invest in something that would have a real impact in the world."

Gorodyansky and his friend launched AnchorFree in 2005. AnchorFree is the creator of Hotspot Shield, a virtual private network provider that is commonly used for Wi-Fi security, Internet privacy and circumventing censorship.

In 2011, AnchorFree's Hotspot Shield was used extensively by protesters during the Arab Spring when Middle Eastern governments began blocking access to video sharing and social media websites. It was used by more than one million users during the Egyptian Revolution of 2011. In 2012, Gorodyansky received an award from the Academy of Achievement and met with justices of the Supreme Court of the United States.

Gorodyansky was selected as one of Inc Magazine's 30 CEOs under 30 years old in 2011. He was selected as one of America's Most Promising CEOs Under 35 in 2013 by Forbes magazine. Gorodyansky was a member of the city of San Francisco's Technology Expert Council, where he was a technology advisor to former San Francisco mayor Gavin Newsom.

In 2014, Gorodyansky received an Ernst & Young Entrepreneur of the Year Award for the Northern California region. He was named one of the 100 Most Intriguing Entrepreneurs by Goldman Sachs.

== Investments ==
Gorodyansky is an investor in GlobeIn, an online exotic arts and crafts marketplace, and job matching site Venturerocket. He has also invested in Modern Meadow, a company that aims to grow leather and meat from primary cells. In 2013, Gorodyansky served as investor and executive producer of #chicagoGirl, a documentary that follows a Syria-born college student that coordinated a social media campaign to help protesters during the Syrian Civil War.

== Influence and Internet Philosophy ==
Businessman Bert Roberts and social entrepreneur Muhammad Yunus have been the two main influences on Gorodyansky's business philosophy. Bert Roberts, a former chief executive officer for MCI Communications, is credited for helping to develop AnchorFree's freemium revenue model and shaping Gorodyansky's views on Internet security and privacy issues. Muhammad Yunus' work on microcredit initiatives and social entrepreneurship have inspired Gorodyansky to focus on global initiatives that have a social impact. A frequent commentator on the interface of social unrest and technology, Gorodyansky noted a tenfold increase in the use of AnchorFree's HotSpot Shield in the 2014 Hong Kong protests.
