= Wujie =

Wujie may refer to:

- Wujie, Nantong (五接镇), town in Tongzhou District, Nantong, Jiangsu, PR China
- Wujie, Yilan (五結鄉), township in eastern Yilan County, Taiwan, Republic of China
- Wujie (software), an anti-censorship software used in mainland China
