= Turkey Blocks =

- Formation: 2015
- Website: https://turkeyblocks.org/

Turkey Blocks (also known as TurkeyBlocks.org) is an independent digital research organization that monitors internet access restrictions and their relation to political incidents in Turkey. Using its network of monitoring probes, the project has uncovered and documented systematic mass-censorship of communications infrastructure, primarily social media services, during national emergencies and incidents of political significance relating to human rights, freedom of expression and public policy in the region.

Describing its activities as non-partisan and impartial, the group does not conduct advocacy directly, instead coordinating with non-profits including international advocacy group Access Now and Turkey's Alternative Informatics Association to help raise public awareness surrounding the human, economic and political cost of internet shutdowns in Turkey.

== Censorship of Wikipedia ==
On the morning of 29 April 2017, Turkey Blocks broke news of the nationwide block of all language editions of the Wikipedia online encyclopedia. The alert, cited widely by international media and Turkish national broadcaster TRT, described a scheme of "filtering [...] in addition to DNS spoofing" applied by service providers to restrict access to the popular website.

== October 2016 cloud storage blocks ==
On 8 October 2016 Turkey Blocks detected, verified and broke news of a major network incident affecting almost all access to cloud storage facilities from Turkey, including Dropbox, Google Drive and Microsoft OneDrive following the leak of politically sensitive emails by hacktivism group RedHack.

A further nationwide block of developer portal GitHub was identified the following day, making Turkey one of few states that have censored GitHub to suppress the spread of sensitive information. The incidents caused widespread outrage amongst technologists, making headlines in technology news outlets both domestically and internationally that potentially contributed to the restoration of service within a matter of days.

== July 2016 military coup attempt ==
The Turkey Blocks research team worked throughout the 2016 Turkish coup d'état attempt to document digital interference, continuing to monitor as jets and tanks neared their office; "We were hearing the jets here in Istanbul and monitoring at the same time. It was pretty crazy," Alp Toker, initiator and coordinator of Turkey Blocks recounts to Deutsche Welle.

Forbes and The Wall Street Journal interpreted the resulting Turkey Blocks data from the night of the abortive coup d'état as indications of a rapid u-turn in Turkey's online policy - timings show that president Recep Tayyip Erdoğan's government first blocked, then subsequently unblocked and effectively used social media service Twitter to mobilize supporters. The measurements collected by Turkey Blocks contributed to the present understanding of the night's violent course, highlighting the influence of social media, online censorship and digital controls on public behavior during national emergencies as ultimately, "Erdogan supporters flooded out onto the streets, the coup was stopped."

== Mass-censorship incidents following terrorist attacks ==
In 2015 Human Rights Watch cited evidence collected by Turkey Blocks in its open letter calling on the government of Turkey to "protect the right of people in Turkey to freely seek, receive, and impart information and ideas through any media and regardless of frontiers." The letter observes that the “network throttling” of Twitter and Facebook following the October 2015 Ankara bombings amplified personal tragedy caused by mass censorship incidents at a "time when citizens relied most on independent news and social media, and directly infringes on people’s right to access information."

Speaking to The Wall Street Journal, Alp Toker identified eight separate incidents of mass-censorship online "often in the wake of a terrorist attack" between July 2015 and July 2016, a number which has continued to rise through late 2016. Each of the incidents identified by Turkey Blocks incorporated censorship of Twitter, and more recently also censorship of Facebook for periods of hours or days.

== Wartime network traffic manipulation ==
In August 2016 researchers at Turkey Blocks identified new emergency wartime legislation introduced by the state as a likely pretext for a social media shutdown observed on the eve of Turkey's military operation Euphrates Shield during which incursions were made on the border with Syria.

== Impact and reception ==
As a relatively young organization with the goal of "changing the way freedom of expression is done," Turkey Blocks claims to have successfully combined investigative journalism with data science to broaden understanding of internet access issues and their underlying causes. Shutdowns were previously observed to coincide with events of political significance, yet were often mis-attributed to network congestion due to lack of data.

In this regard, widespread media coverage and assertive public interest generated in response to the group's findings suggest the methodology to have proven effective as a means for enhancing digital transparency in Turkey.

== See also ==
- GreatFire
