= IUF (disambiguation) =

IUF or Iuf may refer to:

- Institut Universitaire de France
- International Union of Food, Agricultural, Hotel, Restaurant, Catering, Tobacco and Allied Workers' Associations
- International Unicycling Federation
- Internet Ungovernance Forum
- Iuf, ancient Egyptian steward to queen Ahhotep I
