= Hotspot Shield =

Virtual private network provider

- Developer: AnchorFree
- Release: 2008
- Stable release: 11.2.1 / Jul 14, 2022
- Operating system: Windows, macOS, Android, iOS, Windows Phone, Linux
- Size: 20.9 MB
- Available in: English, German, French, Russian, Arabic, Persian, Vietnamese, Chinese, Japanese, Korean, Portuguese, Spanish and Turkish
- Type: VPN
- License: Freemium
- Website: hotspotshield.com

Hotspot Shield is a public VPN service operated by AnchorFree, Inc. Hotspot Shield was used to bypass government censorship during the Arab Spring protests in Egypt, Tunisia, and Libya.

== Overview ==
Hotspot Shield is developed and operated by Pango (former AnchorFree Inc.), a company in Redwood City, California with offices in Boston and Ukraine. The first Hotspot Shield client app was released in April 2008 for Windows and macOS operating systems. It was expanded to include support for iOS and Android in 2011 and 2012, respectively.

The Hotspot Shield client establishes an encrypted VPN connection with one of its supported public VPN servers, through which the user can connect to the Internet. The connection protects the traffic between the user and the server from eavesdropping, and the IP address of the client is not exposed. While the service cannot make users completely anonymous on the Internet, it can greatly increase privacy and security. Users can bypass censorship using Hotspot Shield by connecting to a VPN server located outside their country. Both the client software and the service are freemium: the main features of the client app, as well as a number of public servers are available free of charge, but users have to pay to get additional features, which include the elimination of advertisements, antivirus protection, connecting to more servers and choosing the geographic location of the service to which they connect.

== International use ==
Hotspot Shield has been used to bypass Internet censorship in countries with strict Internet censorship programs. During the Arab Spring protests in 2010, protesters used Hotspot Shield to access social networking tools to communicate and upload videos. Hotspot Shield was also widely used during the Egyptian protests and revolution in 2011, when the Mubarak regime cracked down heavily on access to social media sites. In 2013, usage of Hotspot Shield increased in Turkey, in response to the suspected efforts of the Turkish government to censor social media and citizen access to international websites. In 2014, usage of Hotspot Shield increased in Hong Kong after the outbreak of the 2014 Hong Kong protests.

In 2012, Hotspot Shield usage increased among Mac users in the United States and Europe, as 500,000 Mac users were infected by the Flashback virus. Hotspot Shield was used as a protection against the virus.

Hotspot Shield was one of a dozen circumvention tools evaluated by a Freedom House-funded report based on user experience from China in 2010, which include Ultrasurf, Tor, and Freegate. The tool is for free download.

== Critical reception ==
Hotspot Shield has generally received positive reviews by industry publications and websites. PC Magazine rated the software "excellent" and praised its status indicator, traffic encryption, connection speed at times and payment flexibility, but criticized the software's ad platform, website code injection, slowdown of overall response time and browser setting modifications.

In August 2017, the Center for Democracy and Technology issued an open complaint to the Federal Trade Commission which they state "concerns undisclosed and unclear data sharing and traffic redirection occurring in Hotspot Shield Free VPN that should be considered unfair and deceptive trade practices under Section 5 of the FTC Act." CDT "partnered with researchers at Carnegie Mellon University to analyze the app and the service and found 'undisclosed data sharing practices' with advertising networks."

In February 2018, a security researcher discovered an information disclosure bug in the app that results in a leak of user data, such as in which country the user is located, and the user's Wi-Fi network name, if connected.

== See also ==
- Comparison of virtual private network services
