= Digital Silk Road =

Part of China's Belt and Road Initiative

The Digital Silk Road (DSR) is the digital infrastructure component of China's Belt and Road Initiative (BRI), launched in 2013 to enhance connectivity between China and partner countries. It includes deployment of 5G networks, fiber optic cables, satellite communications, and data center facilities to support cross-border digital trade, e-commerce, and financial integration, including potential use of China's digital renminbi.

China frames the Digital Silk Road as part of an effort to create a community of common destiny in cyberspace. A key component of the strategy is to build digital infrastructure in areas of the global south where private providers have not been willing to develop infrastructure and where local governments do not have the capacity to do so. China's willingness to develop digital infrastructure in such locations is in part due to the expectation that future population growth will be especially high in global south regions.

The Digital Silk Road involves many actors across both China's public and private sectors.

The DSR has expanded China's technological presence internationally through market engagement and diplomatic outreach. China's approach has evolved from providing telecommunications equipment to offering broader technology partnerships encompassing smart cities, cloud infrastructure, and artificial intelligence.

In the Gulf region, countries including Saudi Arabia and the United Arab Emirates have integrated Chinese firms such as Huawei, ZTE, Alibaba Cloud, and CSCEC Middle East into national digital transformation agendas, supporting smart city development, AI deployment, and sovereign cloud services. Chinese vendors are adapting to complex regulatory, security, and operational environments, emphasizing technology localization, governance co-creation, and resilience strategies to sustain influence amid China–U.S. competition.

== History ==
In 2015, General Secretary of the Chinese Communist Party Xi Jinping announced the Digital Silk Road. The Digital Silk Road is a component of the BRI which includes digital technological development, the development of digital standards, and the expansion of digital infrastructure. Its stated aim is to improve digital connectivity among participating countries, with China as the main driver of the improved digital infrastructure, with the benefit to China of reducing its reliance on American digital technology.

Digital Silk Road-related investments in projects outside China reached an estimated US$79 billion as of 2018.

The 2018 Eurasian Economic Unition (EAEU) -China Agreement created a framework for developing cooperation in digitalization and technology, facilitating Chinese companies' deployment of telecommunications infrastructure and smart city projects across the region.

In the EAEU, Chinese technology companies have established significant market presence, particularly following the 2022 Ukrainian crisis when they expanded their foothold in high technology markets across member states including Russia, Belarus, Kazakhstan, and Kyrgyzstan, with Armenia being a notable exception.

In February 2024, leaked documents from a Chinese government contractor based in Shanghai called I-Soon provided details into a hacking campaign involving the critical infrastructure of Digital Silk Road partner countries.

== Assessment ==
The Digital Silk Road has also been described as a pathway to export China's system of mass surveillance and censorship technology of the Great Firewall to multiple countries.

In a 2024 literature review, academics Christopher Foster et al. write that the focus on concerns about the potential negative impacts of Chinese digital expansion in the global south are often speculative, not evidence-based, worries and that there is "virtually no specific evidence as yet about the positive local economic impact of Digital Silk Road."
