= AnchorFree =

Internet security firm

- Founded: 2005
- Founder: David Gorodyansky
- Headquarters: Redwood City, California, USA
- Products: Virtual private network
- Website: www.anchorfree.com

AnchorFree is an internet privacy and security company that provides businesses and consumers with advanced technologies to enable secure and private web browsing. The company's flagship product is Hotspot Shield, a popular virtual private network (VPN) service and the top-grossing app for productivity in the Apple App Store.

The company is led by David Gorodyansky, who founded the firm in 2005 with his friend Eugene Malobrodsky. AnchorFree is headquartered in Redwood City, California, with offices in Ukraine and Russia. Its most recent fundraising round in 2018 brought in $295 million, bringing total funding to $358 million.

== Platforms and users ==
The company works with a 'freemium' model and provides free software with general features and a paid version with certain enhanced features, such as virtual server locations, improved speeds, unlimited bandwidth, and 24/7 live support. Aura Premium unlocks unlimited bandwidth. The software is backed by AnchorFree's Hydra technology.

AnchorFree's apps are available for desktops and mobile devices using Microsoft Windows, Mac OS X, Android and iOS operating systems. The software has been downloaded 650 million times. Additionally, AnchorFree's proprietary technology is utilized by 60% of the world's reputable security companies and several global telecommunication companies.

Hotspot Shield is a significant app in countries where the Internet is censored. The app allows users to gain access to restricted websites privately and securely. The firm reported an increase in its Egyptian user base from 100,000 users to one million during the Arab Spring in 2010. During this time, the program was used to access social media websites like Twitter to organize protests. It was also used in Tunisia and Libya before the Arab Spring.

Since then, AnchorFree's user base has surpassed 650 million downloads. The increase was driven in part by users’ desires to protect themselves online after major privacy and security events like the Equifax data breach, KRACK vulnerability, and the FCC's scrapping of Net Neutrality regulations.

In 2018, the company announced that it had secured a further $295 million in funding from WndrCo, an investment company founded by Ann Daly, Sujay Jaswa, and Jeffrey Katzenberg.

== Reviews and awards ==
In January 2019, TechRadar gave AnchorFree's Hotspot Shield 4 out of 5 stars calling it a “premium VPN for users who value speed.” Reviewer Mike Williams summarized by saying “if raw speed is your top priority, its turbo-charged performance could justify signing up all on its own".

In 2019, Fast Company named AnchorFree the 13th most innovative company in the world and the No. 1 most innovative security company.

AV-Test, an independent security auditor, described AnchorFree's technology as the fastest, most secure on the market.

The Appy Awards named Hotspot Shield the best Online Security/Privacy Application in 2013.

Forbes magazine, for which the company's CEO has written articles, named AnchorFree America's sixth most promising company in 2013.

Business Insider named AnchorFree as one of the 15 most important security startups of 2013.

== Critical reception ==
In August 2017, the Center for Democracy and Technology issued an open complaint to the Federal Trade Commission, which stated "concerns undisclosed and unclear data sharing and traffic redirection occurring in Hotspot Shield Free VPN that should be considered unfair and deceptive trade practices under Section 5 of the FTC Act." CDT "partnered with researchers at Carnegie Mellon University to analyze the app and the service and found 'undisclosed data sharing practices' with advertising networks."

== Acquisition ==
Aura, an Israeli-founded cybersecurity company (via parent Pango Group), acquired AnchorFree in 2020 through its purchase of Pango, integrating Hotspot Shield, Betternet, VPN 360, HexaTech and TouchVPN into its all-in-one digital safety platform.

Headquartered in Boston with strong Israeli roots, Pango was established in Israel in 2017. Aura provides AI-powered identity protection, antivirus, and VPN services to millions worldwide.
