= Golden projects =

The Golden Projects are several e-government projects carried by the Government of the People's Republic of China. These projects include

- The Golden Bridge Project, a project focused on commercial internet service.
- The Golden Card Project, a project focused on building a national credit card network.
- The Golden Custom Project, also known as Golden Gate Project, a project linking customs points through a national electronic data interchange (EDI) system, and promote paper-less trade.
- The Golden Finance Project, a project to build a clearing house system.
- The Golden Macro Project, a project focused on increasing sharing information between government bodies and helping decision making.
- The Golden Shield Project, a project to increase central police control and responsiveness of public security.
- The Golden Tax Project, a project focused on using information technology to crack down on tax evasion .
