= Fang Binxing =

Chinese computer scientist

- 方滨兴
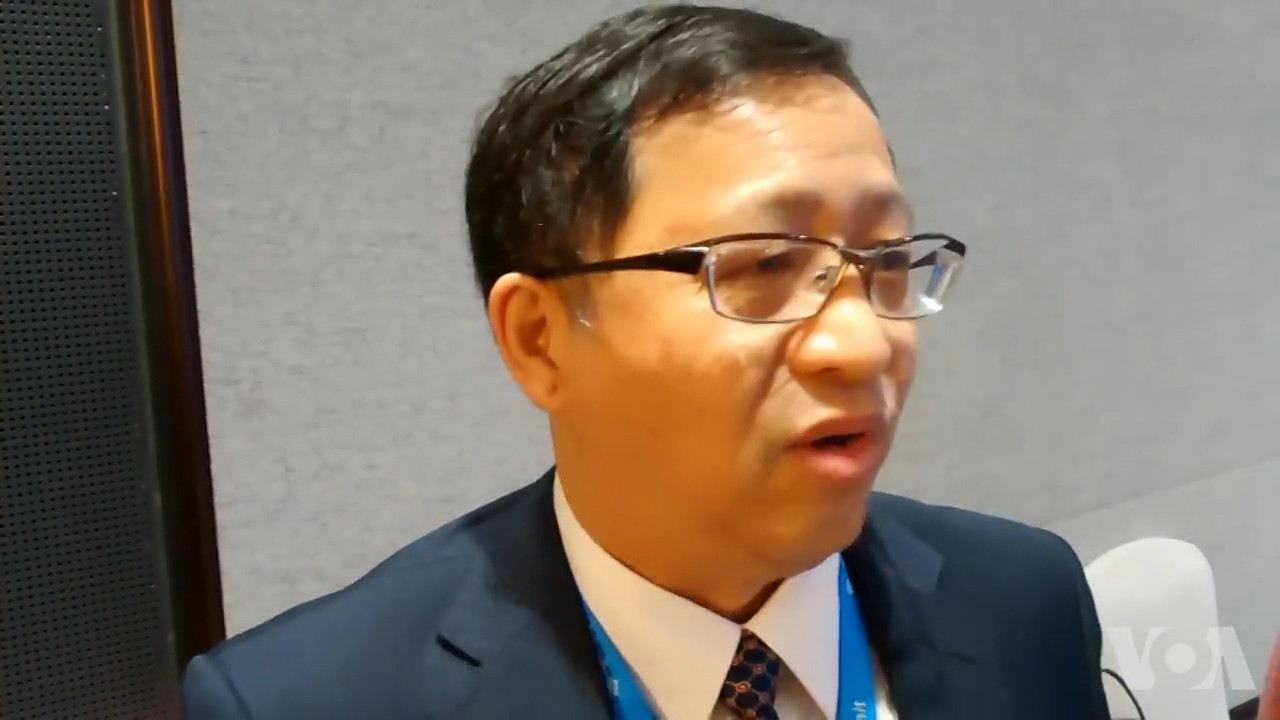
- Born: 17 July 1960 (age 66); Harbin, Heilongjiang, China
- Occupation: Computer scientist
- Political party: Chinese Communist Party

Fang Binxing
- Simplified Chinese: 方滨兴
- Traditional Chinese: 方濱興
Transcriptions
Standard Mandarin
- Hanyu Pinyin: Fāng Bīnxīng

Fang Binxing is a former Principal of Beijing University of Posts and Telecommunications. He is also known for his substantial contribution to China's Internet censorship infrastructure, and has been dubbed "Father of China's Great Firewall". Fang is also known for his role in Russia's Internet censorship due to his relationship with Igor Shchyogolev, former Russian communications minister and Russian President Putin's deputy on Internet issues.

== Biography ==
Fang was born on 17 July 1960 in Harbin, Heilongjiang province. Fang went to university at The Harbin Institute of Technology, where he earned a PhD in computer science and became a lecturer. He began working at the National Computer Network Emergency Response Technical Team/Coordination Center of China in 1999 as deputy chief engineer; from 2000 he was chief engineer and director. It was in this position that he oversaw the development of the filtering and blocking technology that has become known as the Great Firewall, and thus, he has been dubbed "Father of China's Great Firewall".

Fang has defended the Great Firewall in the media, stating that it is a "natural reaction to something newborn and unknown" and that web censoring is a "common phenomenon around the world". Appearing on China Central Television in March 2010, Fang accused Google of conducting censorship such as Chilling Effects.

Fang has helped create a major electronic surveillance operation in Chongqing for party secretary Bo Xilai. The system involved wiretaps, eavesdropping, and monitoring of internet communications.

Fang also helped establish the School of Cyber Science and Technology of Harbin Institute of Technology in June 2019, which focusing on information content security, network infrastructure security, integrated security in space, air and earth, and international governance of cyberspace.

Fang served as president of the Beijing University of Post and Telecommunication till 2013.

== Incidents ==
=== 2011 shoe throwing incident ===
On 19 May 2011, Fang was hit on the chest by a shoe thrown at him by a Huazhong University of Science and Technology student who calls himself "Hanjunyi" (Chinese: 寒君依 /小湖北) while Fang was giving a lecture at Wuhan University. According to RFI, the student discussed the planned shoe attack on Twitter, and with the help of other bloggers, was able to locate the exact whereabouts and the time of Fang's lecture. After the shoe throwing incident, "Hanjunyi" was able to walk out while other students were trying to obstruct school teachers who were going to detain him. "Hanjunyi" had since become an instant internet hero of the Chinese blogosphere, with bloggers offering him a large number of presents, such as cash, airline tickets, buffet dinners at Hong Kong five-star hotels, tours of various sex parlors, sight-seeing tours, a virtual private network, iPad2, admission ticket to Hong Kong Disneyland, escorted tour of Singapore, free hotel rooms, free sex with admiring female bloggers, free shoes and designer clothes. An anonymous blogger even promised him a position in his company if ever "Hanjunyi" is in trouble with the authorities.

During an interview with CNN, "Hanjunyi" said: "I'm not happy about what he (Fang) does. His work made me spend unnecessary money to get access to the website that is supposed to be free... He makes my online surfing very inconvenient."

=== 2016 VPN incident ===
In April 2016, reports of a botched presentation by Fang went viral. Fang was speaking at his alma mater, the Harbin Institute of Technology, and reportedly planned to display some South Korean web sites as part of the presentation. After his initial attempts were blocked by the Great Firewall, Fang publicly attempted, with mixed success, to bypass the firewall with a VPN. The question-and-answer session following the presentation was cancelled. According to Ming Pao, Fang was later resoundingly mocked online.
