= Internet Ungovernance Forum =

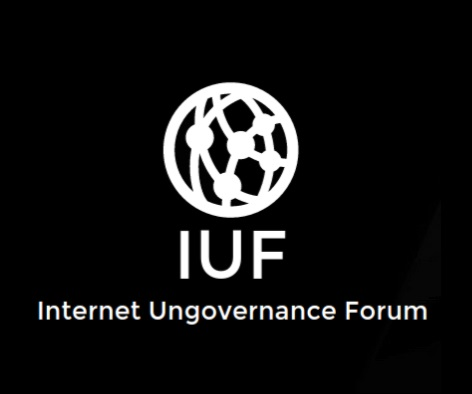
Internet Ungovernance Forum

The Internet Ungovernance Forum (IUF) is an open forum for dialogue on issues of Internet censorship, freedom of speech, surveillance, privacy and community-centric governance approaches conceived by the Alternative Informatics Association. The first Forum was held in Turkey in September, 2014 and served as model for the organization of the Brazilian and Italian Forums of 2015.

== History and development of the IUF ==
=== IUF Turkey 2014 ===
The first Internet Ungovernance Forum was held in September 2014 in Turkey to demand that fundamental freedoms, openness, unity and net neutrality remain as the building blocks of the Internet. It was held in parallel to the Internet Governance Forum (IGF), which was already taking place in Istanbul between 2–5 September 2014.

Earlier that year, access to YouTube and Twitter had been blocked in Turkey.

Issues of internet censorship, “preventive” website blocking orders without court's permission, surveillance and privacy in Turkey raised concerns among activists, and they started organizing the forum. They felt that issues such as Net neutrality, Internet privacy and Freedom of Speech were not getting the right attention at IGF.

Participants of the two-day conference included Julian Assange, Jacob Appelbaum and Amelia Andersdotter.

=== IUF Brazil 2015 ===
Because IGF fails to address issues such as: the controversies of the Brazilian Civil Rights Framework for the Internet; the fact that since 2013 law enforcement from Brazil has been acquiring surveillance devices from "Hacking Team" to be used against activists; the recent Brazilian laws institutionalizing mass surveillance and data retention of all of its citizens; the congressional attempts to increase custody of massive logs and data to all the population and the ongoing process of criminalizing as terrorism any kind of hacktivism, Brazilian activists decided to organize their own forum in November 2015, parallel to the IGF that was going to be held in Joao Pessoa, Brazil.

=== IUF Italy 2015 ===
IUF Italy was held in Rome on November 7, 2015. Speakers included Internet Bill of Rights commissioner Stefano Rodotà and ICANN representative Stefania Milan.
