= Freegate =

Internet software utility

- Freegate 7.27
- Developer: Dynamic Internet Technology Inc. (DIT)
- Stable release: Freegate 8.03 / June 28, 2025
- Operating system: Windows, Android mobile
- Available in: English, Chinese, Spanish
- Type: Anonymizer
- License: Freeware
- Website: dongtaiwang.com/loc/phome_en.php
- Repository: https://github.com/freegate-release/

Freegate is a software application developed by Dynamic Internet Technology (DIT) that enables internet users to view websites blocked by their governments. The program takes advantage of a range of proxy servers called Dynaweb. This allows users to bypass Internet firewalls that block web sites by using DIT's Peer-to-peer (P2P)-like proxy network system. FreeGate's anti-censorship capability is further enhanced by a new, unique encryption and compression algorithm in the versions of 6.33 and above. Dynamic Internet Technology estimates Freegate had 200,000 users in 2004. The maintainer and CEO of DIT is Bill Xia.

Freegate was one of a dozen circumvention tools evaluated by a Freedom House-funded report based on user experience from China in 2010, which include Hotspot Shield, Tor, and Ultrasurf. The tool is free to download.

== Dynaweb ==
DynaWeb is a collection of anti-censorship services provided by Dynamic Internet Technology Inc. (DIT). DynaWeb is a web-based anti-censorship portal. Once users point their web browser at one of the DynaWeb URLs, a web page will be presented similar to the original, with most blocked websites as links. In addition, a user can type in any URL in the box on this page and DynaWeb will fetch the pages for him or her instantly. No software is needed, nor are any settings tweaked on a user's computer. Since the Chinese net police watch DynaWeb's portal websites closely and block them as soon as they identify them, DynaWeb must be dynamic. It has hundreds of mirror sites at any time, and each with a varying IP and DNS domain names to defeat IP blocking and DNS hijacking. On the backend, DynaWeb also has mechanisms to proactively monitor the blocking status of each of its mirror sites, and as soon as blocking is detected, it will change the IP and DNS domain name instantly.

To keep users connected to such a dynamic infrastructure, DynaWeb has a variety of channels to keep users updated. For example, a user can send a message to one of DynaWeb's instant messenger (IM) accounts, and will get an instant reply showing the newest addresses of DynaWeb portals. Similar things are being done with emails. By these many, dynamic channels, DynaWeb outsmarts any attempt to collect all DynaWeb addresses by the censors, because each user receives only a (different) subset of DynaWeb's addresses. Automatic blocking detection combined with quick reaction apparently frustrates the blocking efforts on the China side of the Great Firewall of China (GFW).

DIT also releases a tiny piece of software, FreeGate, which directly taps into DynaWeb's backbone and keeps a user connected to the dynamic channels automatically.

Today, DynaWeb offers a wide range of options for users to access the Internet freely, supporting more than 50 million web hits per day on average from Chinese users alone.

== Creation and funding ==
DIT was founded in 2001 to provide email delivery services to China for US government agencies and NGOs. In 2002, DIT started to provide anti-censorship services under the framework of DynaWeb, and like UltraSurf, DynaWeb became a top contender of the GFW-penetration effort.

Freegate was created by Falun Gong practitioners and has been financed by the Broadcasting Board of Governors, a US governmental agency. Freegate also receives funding from Human Rights in China, which is also one of its clients and which receives some funding from the American non-profit organization the National Endowment for Democracy. According to a US Congressional Research Service (CRS) report, the US government gave funding of $685,000 to Freegate in 2005.

== Malware reports ==
In 2004, the Financial Times, citing a member of staff at Symantec in mainland China, reported that Norton AntiVirus identified Freegate as a Trojan horse. There were initial fears that the reports may be a ploy by the Chinese Communist Party (CCP) authorities to encourage removal of the software from computers, but it was soon delisted as a threat. Symantec explained that its detection was based on the software operating similarly to various Trojan horses, based on the use of proxies to penetrate firewalls used to block web sites, but that it had modified its detection to exclude Freegate.

In 2013, it was reported that "pro-government electronic actors" in Syria sent electronic messages to rebels encouraging them to download a file named Freegate which was claimed to be designed to help dissidents circumvent state surveillance agencies, but actually it was a malware and the intruder was able to monitor what the victims were typing on their computers and read or remove the files.

In August 2013 while Freegate was testing a new proxy program, some people thought it was a phishing attack. Reports from Iran said the users who used Freegate to pass Internet censorship in Iran, were led to a fake page instead of Facebook's main website. Freegate published a note saying they were testing a new proxy program, and the fake Facebook page was a tunnel. Although IT experts warned users to be careful with the tunnel link because it doesn't use SSL security so users' information is not encrypted.

== See also ==
- Internet censorship circumvention
- Ultrasurf
- Golden Shield Project
- Internet censorship
- Internet censorship in the People's Republic of China
- Tor (anonymity network) – a free product sponsored by the Tor Project that implements onion routing where web connections are repeatedly encrypted and then sent through several proxies making tracing more difficult.
