= Alternative Informatics Association =

Turkish non-profit organization

- Founded: December 31, 2010
- Type: Non-profit organization
- Location: Dikmen Caddesi No: 220-B/8 Çankaya Ankara, Turkey
- President: Faruk Çayır
- Website: www.alternatifbilisim.org

The Alternative Informatics Association (Turkish: Alternatif Bilişim Derneği) is an Istanbul-based civil society organization focusing on the issues of media literacy, Internet censorship, and mass surveillance.

The association organizes conferences, workshops, publishes e-books, as well as contributes to the organization of online and offline campaigns against internet censorship, mass surveillance. Members have also contributed to publications and activities concerning digital literacy and online games.

== Activities ==
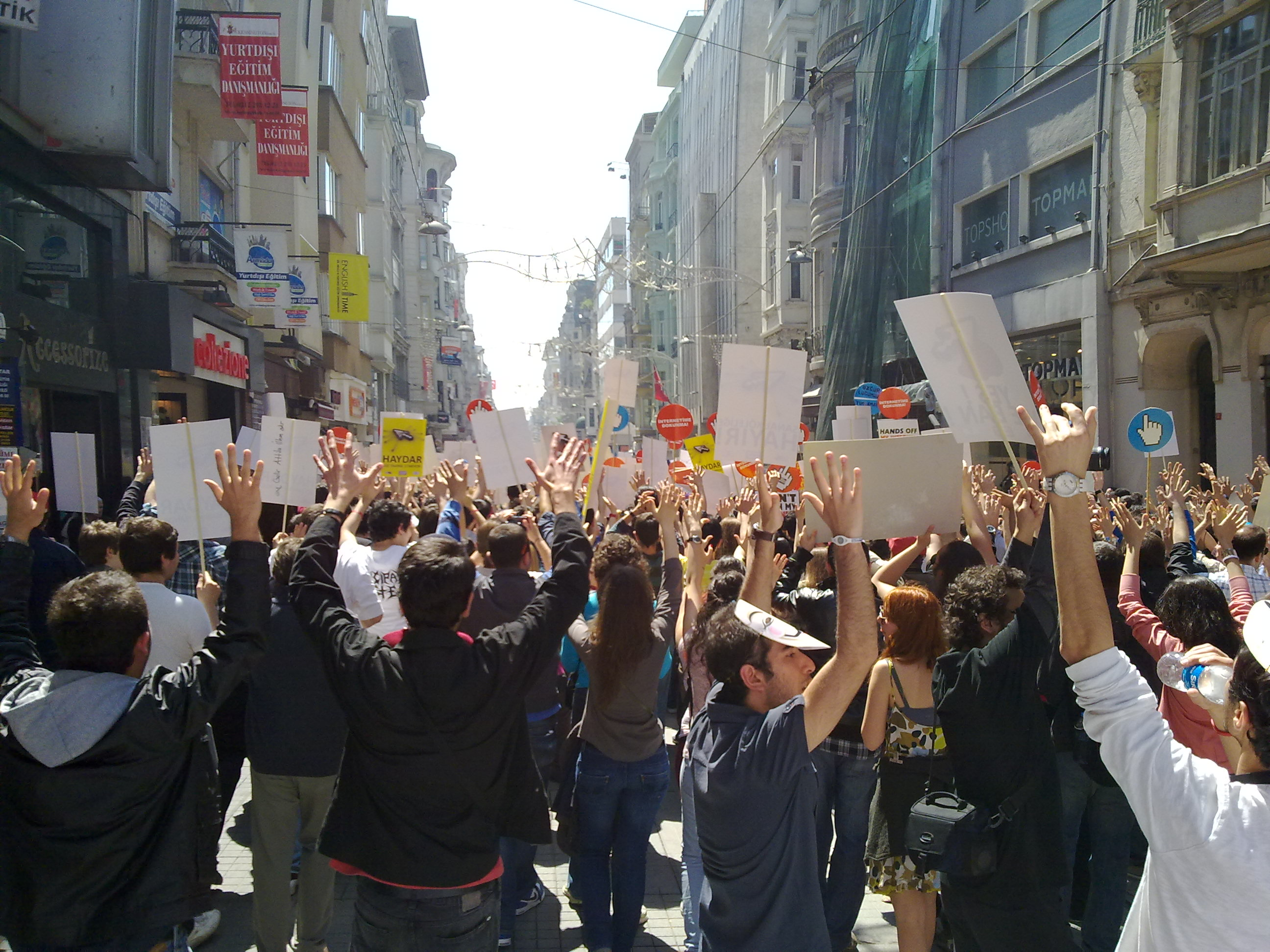
Activists protest against internet censorship on İstiklal Avenue

Members of the association were part of the organization committee of Turkey's largest street protests against Internet censorship which took place in July 2010 in Istanbul and May 2011 with demonstrations in 30 cities.

In recent years the association has expanded its role in reporting breaches of digital rights in Turkey and demanding the protection of associated freedoms.

The Alternative Informatics Association organizes the annual New Media conference in Turkey which has brought together academics, activists and journalists to discuss threats against digital freedom.

== History ==
Alternative Informatics Association gained its official status on December 31, 2010. However, the activities started online and offline before its inauguration.

=== 2008 ===
- November 2008: ozgurinternet.info established

=== 2009 ===
- June 7, 2009: Conference on the Internet Bans and Approaches to the Internet, Baro Apaydın Saloon/İstanbul
- November 21, 2009: Panel Discussion on "Hate Speech on New Media", Tarık Z. Tunaya K.M./İstanbul

=== 2010 ===
- March, 2010: Panel Discussion on "Hate Speech on New Media", Ankara University Communication Faculty Ankara
- April, 2010: A Workshop for Discussing the Internet BEKSAV /Ankara
- June–July 2010: The Declaration of the Common Platform against the Censhorship, Taksim Protest March, Active participation in Turkish Grand Assembly Visits
- July 1–4, 2010: Panel Discussion on Cultural Industries and Copy-Left European Social Forum, Istanbul
- September 21–23, 2010: Participation in TBD (Informatics Association of Turkey) Informatics Convention/Ankara
- September, 2010: Published book Hate Speech on the New Media- Collected Work, Kalkedon Publications
- December 2–4, 2010: Participation in I-net, ITU (Istanbul Technical university)/Istanbul
- December 31, 2010: Alternative Informatics Association gained its official status.

=== 2011 ===
- January 29, 2011 "Panel Discussion on WikiLeaks", EMO (Chamber of Energy Engineers)/Istanbul
- February 27, 2011 "Panel Discussion on Knowledge, Power, Internet Opposition", BİLMÖK (Congress of Computer Engineering Students), Yeditepe University
- March 16, 2011 "Panel Discussion on the Internet Bans", Yıldız Technical University, Computer Education Department, Istanbul
- March 24, 2011, Panel Discussion on Hate Speech on the New Media, Anadolu University, Eskişehir
- April 16, 2011, Workshop on Hate Speech on the New Media, International Hate Speeches Conference, Lütfi Kırdar/İstanbul
- April 28, 2011, Day for Tracking Hate Speeches on the New Media, Turkey
- May 6, 2011, Alternative Approach to ERP Processes, ERP Days Chamber of Architects and Engineers, ITU (İstanbul Technical University), Gümüşsuyu/Istanbul
- May 10, 2011, Board for Information Technologies and Communication, Report against the Decision and Filter Application of the Board
- May 15, 2011, March Against the Internet Censorship called "Don't Touch My Internet", Istanbul/Ankara
- May 21, 2011 "Social Media" Computer Education Department Congress, YTÜ/Istanbul
- May 25, 2011 "Participation in the Meeting of the Internet Board", Istanbul
- June 3, 2011, Panel Discussion: Internet Censorship in Turkey Boğaziçi Univ., İstanbul
- June 4, 2011, Workshop on Moral Values on the New Media, Kadir Has University, Department of New Media, İstanbul
- Bring the case on the prevention of the website "sites.google.com" to European Court of Human Rights,
- E-Book on Wikileaks and Arab Spring, titled Courageous New Media, April 2011
- E-book, Politics Of E-Participation: Young People Online, ISBN 978-605-62169-1-6
- September 12–13, UNICEF Workshop, Internet Usage of Youths and Children in Turkey, Ankara
- September 16, Seminars on Dijital Video Games, METU Ankara
- September 17, Internet Censorship, EMO Samsun,
- September 17, Forbidding Forbidden round table meeting, ISEA, Istanbul
- September 20, discussion P2P theory with Micahel Bauwens, Istanbul
- October 14–15, Workshop on Mapping with FreeSoftwares, OpenStreetMap, Istanbul
- October 16, Alternative Media Festival, Hate Speech, Digital Activism, Istanbul
- November 10, case against the Decision and Filter Application of the Board, Ankara
- November 18–20, LabourStart Int. Conference, Linux Workshop, Istanbul
- December 1–3, sessions on INET'11, Censorship, Law and Internet, Internet Media and DPI, İZMİR
- November 21–23, UNICEF Children Forum, Internet Usage of Youths and Children in Turkey, ANKARA
- December 4 and January 21, Meetings on Internet as a Human Right on New Constitution, collaborated with Friedrich-Ebert-Stiftung Turkei, ISTANBUL
- December 27, session on Chaos Communication Congress 28C3, Berlin

=== 2012 ===
- January 7, declaration, Academic Awareness and a Call to All University Rectorships Against The Deployment of ICTA's Filter
- January 2012, Participating on establishing of Turkey Digital Game Association
- February 18, Internet Blackout against SOPA
- March 2012, Seminar Digital Surveillance, Marmara Unv.
- March 2012, initiating of Istanbul HackerSpace, Istanbul
- March 2012, Seminar "Suç altette mi?" on SOPA, PIPA, ACTA, etc., Bahçeşehir Unv., Istanbul
- March 2012, Workshop: "The Future of Pardus" (Linux Distro by TUBITAK), IZMIT
- March 2012, Workshop: Mind Map with VUE (visual understanding environment), Free Software Days Istanbul
- April 9, Declaration of Internet Users' Rights
- April 16, Statement about Internet in Turkey
- May 20, Published Book: Digital Surveillance in Turkey: Digital Personification of Citizens in Turkey from ID Numbers to E- IDs
- June 16, Panel: "Digital Surveillance in Turkey"
- October 23, Panel: "Surveillance, Censorship and Data Protection in Turkey", ECREA Pre-Conference

=== 2014 ===
- September 2014, Internet Ungovernance Forum at Bilgi University

=== 2015 ===
- July 2015: Digital rights activist Isik Mater voted in as president of the association

=== 2019 ===
- February 2015 Lawyer Faruk Çayır voted in as president of the association

== See also ==
- Human rights in Turkey
