= GreatFire =

Organization monitoring status of websites censored in China

GreatFire.org

- Formation: 2011
- Type: Website
- Purpose: Advocacy against Internet censorship in China
- Website: en.greatfire.org

GreatFire (GreatFire.org) is a website (Note: The website declares itself as a "non-profit organization." However, there is neither evidence provided to support this claim, nor is there third-party evidence that it is registered in any jurisdiction.) that monitors the status of websites censored by the Great Firewall of China and helps Chinese Internet users circumvent the censorship and blockage of websites in China. The site was first launched in 2011 by an anonymous trio. GreatFire is funded by sources inside and outside China, including the US-government-backed Open Technology Fund.

GreatFire hosts a testing system that allows visitors to test in real time the accessibility of a website from various locations within China. The organization's stated mission was to "bring transparency to the Great Firewall of China". GreatFire also provides another test system, Blocky, which allows users to search for online services and check their status.

GreatFire has worked with BBC to make the Chinese-language BBC website available to users in China, despite it being blocked by the Great Firewall, by using a method known as collateral freedom that mirrored content on widely used content delivery networks, such as Amazon CloudFront and CloudFlare, so that it would be too economically costly for censors to block. The organization has since set up similar mirror sites for other blocked websites, such as Google and the New York Times, with a directory of links hosted on GitHub.

For security reasons, the members of the organization remain anonymous and do not know much about each other to prevent the whole project from coming down in the event one would be caught by the Chinese government.

GreatFire has been targeted with distributed denial-of-service attacks that attempt to take down the website by overloading its servers with traffic. In April 2015, it was targeted by a Chinese attack tool named Great Cannon that redirected massive amounts of Internet traffic to servers used by GreatFire.

A sister site, FreeWeibo, monitors and makes available content from leading Chinese microblogging site Sina Weibo that has been censored and deleted by Chinese authorities under the Great Firewall.

In 2015, the Associated Press reported that GreatFire receives funding from a variety of sources, including the Open Technology Fund (OTF), a United States government-backed program. The Open Technology Fund says on its website that it gave Greatfire.org a $114,000 grant in 2014. On its website, the organization identifies GreatFire as an "OTF-supported" initiative.

== See also ==
- OONI
- Turkey Blocks
